= Empress Xu (Ming dynasty) =

Empress of China from 1402 to 1407

Empress Renxiaowen 仁孝文皇后
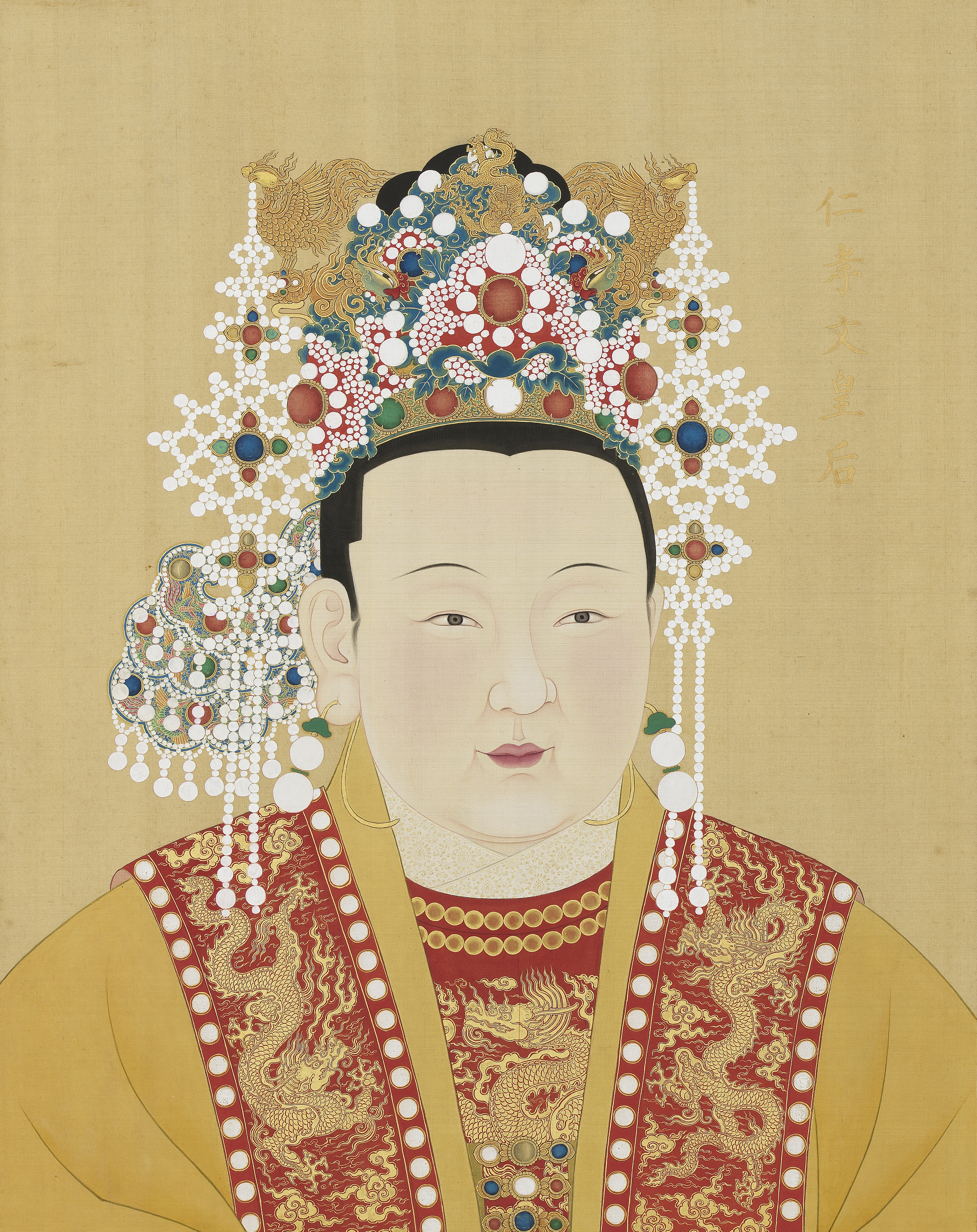

Empress consort of the Ming dynasty
- Tenure: 17 July 1402 – 6 August 1407
- Predecessor: Empress Xiaominrang
- Successor: Empress Chengxiaozhao

Princess consort of Yan
- Tenure: 1376–1402
- Born: 5 March 1362; Yingtian (present-day Nanjing, Jiangsu, China)
- Died: 6 August 1407 (aged 45); Forbidden City, Nanjing
- Burial: Chang Mausoleum, Ming tombs
- Spouse: Yongle Emperor (m. 1376)
- Issue: Hongxi Emperor; Zhu Gaoxu, Prince of Han; Zhu Gaosui, Prince Jian of Zhao; Princess Yong'an; Princess Yong'ping; Princess Ancheng; Princess Xianning
Posthumous name
- Empress Rénxiào Cíyì Chéngmíng Zhuāngxiàn Pèitiān Qíshèng Wēn (仁孝慈懿誠明庄獻配天齊聖文皇后)
- Clan: Xu (徐)
- Father: Xu Da, Prince of Zhongshan
- Mother: Lady Xie (謝氏)

Empress Renxiaowen (仁孝文皇后; 5 March 1362 – 6 August 1407), of the Xu clan, was the empress consort to the Yongle Emperor and the third empress of the Chinese Ming dynasty. She was well educated, compiling bibliographies of virtuous women, an activity connected with court politics.

== Biography ==
Lady Xu was born in 1362, as the eldest daughter of Xu Da and Lady Xie (謝氏), second daughter of Xie Zaixing (謝再興). She had four brothers—Xu Huizu (徐輝祖), Xu Tianfu (徐添福), Xu Yingxu (徐膺緒), and Xu Zengshou (徐增壽)—and two younger sisters, who were the wives of Zhu Gui, Prince Jian of Dai (thirteenth son of the Hongwu Emperor) and Zhu Ying, Prince Hui of An (twenty-second son of the Hongwu Emperor). On 17 February 1376, she married the Zhu Di, Prince of Yan, the Hongwu Emperor's fourth son. After Zhu Di ascended the throne as the Yongle Emperor on 17 July 1402, Consort Xu, as his primary wife, was created empress in December 1402.

A devout Buddhist, Xu is the first person credited with transcribing a Buddhist sutra from a dream revelation. The work is entitled Da Ming Ren xiao Huang hou meng kan Fo Shuo di yi xi yu da gong de jing (The sutra of great merit of the foremost rarity spoken by the Buddha which the Renxiao empress of the great Ming received in a dream). In her introduction to the sutra, the empress wrote that one night after meditating and burning incense, Guanyin appeared to her as if in a dream, and took her to a holy realm where the sutra was revealed to her in order to save her from disaster. After reading the sutra three times, she was able to memorize it and recall it perfectly upon awakening and writing it down. The sutra conveys conventional Mahayana philosophies, and the mantras for chanting were typical of Tibetan Buddhist practices.

== Titles ==
- During the reign of the Hongwu Emperor (r. 1368–1398):
  - Lady Xu (徐氏)
  - Princess Consort of Yan (燕王妃; from 1376)
- During the reign of the Yongle Emperor (r. 1402–1424):
  - Empress (皇后; from 17 July 1402)
  - Empress Renxiao (仁孝皇后; from 1407)
  - Empress Renxiao Ciyi Chengming Zhuangxian Peitian Qisheng Wen (仁孝慈懿誠明庄獻配天齊聖文皇后; from 1424)

== Issue ==
- As Princess consort of Yan:
  - Zhu Gaochi, the Hongxi Emperor (洪熙帝 朱高熾; 16 August 1378 – 29 May 1425), the Yongle Emperor's first son
  - Zhu Gaoxu, Prince of Han (漢王 朱高煦; 30 December 1380 – 6 October 1426), the Yongle Emperor's second son
  - Zhu Gaosui, Prince Jian of Zhao (趙簡王 朱高燧; 19 January 1383 – 5 October 1431), the Yongle Emperor's third son
  - Princess Yong'an (永安公主; 1377–1417), personal name Yuying (玉英), the Yongle Emperor's first daughter
    - Married Yuan Rong (袁容), and had issue (one son, three daughters)
  - Princess Yong'ping (永平公主; 1379 – 22 April 1444), the Yongle Emperor's second daughter
    - Married Li Rang (李讓), and had issue (one son)
  - Princess Ancheng (安成公主; 1384 – 16 September 1443), the Yongle Emperor's third daughter
    - Married Song Hu (宋琥) in 1402, and had issue (one son)
  - Princess Xianning (咸寧公主; 1385 – 27 July 1440), the Yongle Emperor's fourth daughter
    - Married Song Ying (宋瑛; d. 1449) in 1403, and had issue (one son)

== Ancestry ==
Xu Wusi
Xu Siqi
Lady He
Xu Liusi
Lady Zhou
Xu Da (1332–1385)
Lady Cai
Empress Renxiaowen (1362–1407)
Xie Zaixing
Lady Xie

Chinese royalty
Preceded by Empress Xiaominrang	Empress consort of China; December 1402 – August 1407	Succeeded by Empress Chengxiaozhao
