= Hu Guang =

Hu Guang or Hú Guāng may refer to:

- Hu Guang (scholar) (1370–1418), Ming Dynasty scholar-official
- Arc Light (film), 1989 Chinese film

== See also ==
- Huguang
