= Consort Gwon =

Consort Gwon may refer to:

- Su-bi Gwon (died 1340), consort of Chungsuk of Goryeo
- Consort Gwon (Ming dynasty) (1391–1410), concubine of the Yongle Emperor
- Queen Hyeondeok (1418–1441), wife of Crown Prince Yi Hyang
