= Princess Yong'an =

Chinese princess (1377–1417)

Zhu Yuying 朱玉英
- Princess Yong'an (永安公主)

Marchioness of Guangping
- Born: 20 July 1377; Yingtian, Zhili (present-day Nanjing, Jiangsu, China)
- Died: 26 January 1417 (aged 39)
- Burial: Nanfang, Fangshan District, Beijing
- Spouse: Yuan Rong, Marquis of Guangping
- Issue: Yuan Zhen; Yuan Ningning; Yuan Yaoying; Yuan Shou'en
- House: Zhu (by birth); Yuan (by marriage)
- Father: Yongle Emperor
- Mother: Empress Renxiaowen

Princess Yong'an
- Traditional Chinese: 永安公主
- Simplified Chinese: 永安公主
Transcriptions
Standard Mandarin
- Hanyu Pinyin: Yǒng'ān Gōngzhǔ

Zhu Yuying
- Chinese: 朱玉英
Transcriptions
Standard Mandarin
- Hanyu Pinyin: Zhū Yùyīng

Princess Yong'an (Chinese: 永安公主, 20 July 1377 – 26 January 1417), born Zhu Yuying (朱玉英), was a princess of the Ming dynasty. She was the oldest daughter of the Yongle Emperor and the elder sister of the Hongxi Emperor.

== Life ==
Zhu Yuying was born on 20 July 1377, to Zhu Di, who held at that time the title of Prince Yan (燕王), and his primary consort, Lady Xu.

When her father ascended the throne, she was honoured as Princess Yong'an (永安公主) and her husband was awarded the title of Prince Consort (駙馬). Later, her husband was granted the title of Marquis of Guangping.

Zhu Yuying had six siblings by the same mother: Zhu Gaochi, Zhu Gaoxu, Zhu Gaosui, Princess Yongping, Princess Ancheng and Princess Xianning. Furthermore, she had two half-siblings from her father's concubines: Princess Changning and Zhu Gaoxi.

The princess was married to Yuan Rong, with whom she had four children: one son and three daughters. Her son, Yuan Zhen, inherited his father title and became the second Marquis Guangping.

Princess Yong'an died on 26 January 1417 of unknown causes. She was buried in Fangshan, Beijing.

== Family ==
- Husband: Yuan Rong, Marquis of Guangping (廣平侯 袁容, d. January 1428), son of Yuan Hong (袁洪)
- Son: Yuan Zhen (袁禎), 2nd Marquis of Guangping
- Daughters:
  - Yuan Ningning (袁寧寧), first daughter
    - Married Zheng Neng (鄭能), son of Zheng Heng, Marquis of Wu'an (武安侯 鄭亨)
  - Yuan Yaoying (袁堯英), second daughter
  - Yuan Shou'en (袁受恩), third daughter

== Ancestry ==
Zhu Chuyi
Zhu Shizhen (1281–1344)
Empress Yu
Hongwu Emperor (1328–1398)
Lord Chen (1235–1334)
Empress Chun (1286–1344)
Yongle Emperor (1360–1424)
Empress Xiaocigao (1332–1382)
Lady Zheng
Zhu Yuying (1377–1417)
Xu Siqi
Xu Liusi
Lady Zhou
Xu Da (1332–1385)
Lady Cai
Empress Renxiaowen (1362–1407)
Xie Zaixing
Lady Xie
