= Consort Ryeo =

Ming dynasty concubine (1393–1413)

Lady of Handsome Fairness Ryeo 呂婕妤
- Born: 1393; Kingdom of Joseon
- Died: 1413 (aged 19–20); Beijing
- Spouse: Yongle Emperor
- Clan: Ryeo (여; 呂)
- Father: Ryeo Gwi-jin (여귀진; 呂貴眞)

Consort Ryeo (1393–1413) was an imperial concubine of the Yongle Emperor.

She was from Korea. She became a member of the imperial harem of the Yongle Emperor in 1409. In 1410, the emperor's favorite concubine, Consort Gongxianxian, died. In 1413, Lady Ryeo was arrested on order of the emperor, accused of having murdered Consort Gongxianxian by use of poison. She was tortured to death for murder. All her eunuchs and maids were executed as accomplices as well.

== Titles ==
- During the reign of the Hongwu Emperor (r. 1368–1398):
  - Lady Ryeo (여씨, 呂氏) (from 1393)
- During the reign of the Yongle Emperor (r. 1402–1424):
  - Gong-nyeo (공녀, 貢女) (from 1409)
  - Lady of Handsome Fairness (婕妤; from 1409)
