= Xie Jin (mandarin) =

Chinese official (1369–1415)

- 解縉
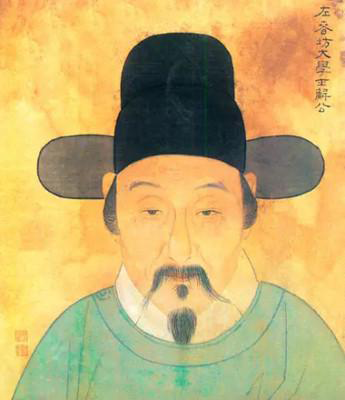
- Portrait of Xie Jin by Gu Jianlong

Chancellor of the Hanlin Academy
- In office 1404–1407
- Monarch: Yongle

Senior Grand Secretary
- In office 1402–1407
- Monarch: Yongle
- Succeeded by: Hu Guang

Grand Secretary
- In office 1402–1407
- Monarch: Yongle

Personal details
- Born: 1369 present-day Jishui County, Jiangxi
- Died: 1415 (aged 45–46)
- Education: juren degree in the provincial examination held by Jiangxi province (1387) jinshi degree (1388)
- Occupation: Calligrapher, poet, politician
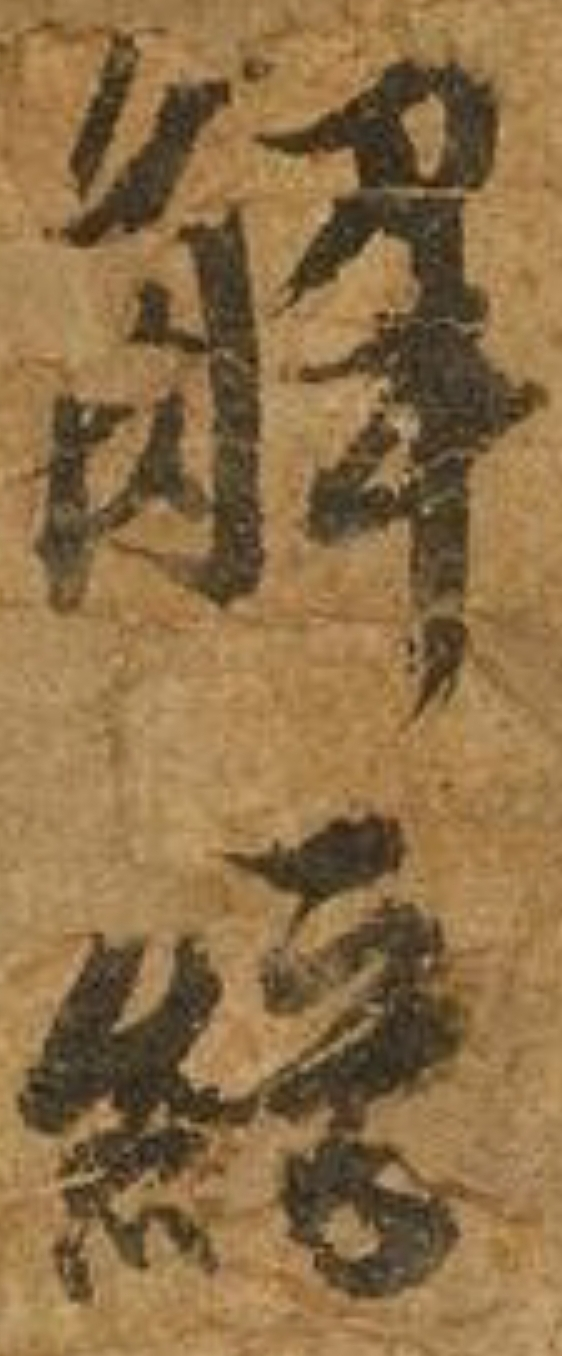
- Signature

Chinese name
- Traditional Chinese: 解縉
- Simplified Chinese: 解缙
Transcriptions
Standard Mandarin
- Hanyu Pinyin: Xiè Jìn

Xie Jin (Note: Xie Jin used the courtesy name Dashen (大紳) and the art name Chunyu (春雨).) (1369–1415) was a Chinese scholar-official, painter, and calligrapher during the Ming dynasty. He served as grand secretary during the reign of the Yongle Emperor from 1402 to 1407. His career was cut short due to the animosity of the Emperor's younger son, Zhu Gaoxu. In 1411, Xie was removed from office, arrested, and ultimately killed after spending several years in prison.

== Biography ==
Xie Jin was born in 1369 during China's Ming dynasty, in Jishui zhou, Ji'an lu (present-day Jishui County, Ji'an, Jiangxi). He came from a family with a long-standing tradition of government service; his father, Xie Kai (解開, 1312–1398), was a member of the educated gentry, and two of his father's brothers served in the Ming government. Xie showed exceptional aptitude for Confucian studies as a child, and in 1387, he passed the provincial civil service examination. The following year, at a remarkably young age, he passed the highest level of examinations, known as the palace examination, and was awarded the rank of jinshi. Xie's older brother, Xie Jing (解經, 1343–1411), also achieved the same rank through the palace examination.

After this, Xie was appointed to a position in the central administration (Secretariat Drafter, 中書舍人, Zhongshu Sheren). He quickly caught the attention of the Hongwu Emperor with his extensive knowledge and literary abilities. His confidence in the Emperor's favor led to him becoming overly critical and bordering on arrogant, which caused displeasure among his superiors. As a result, the Emperor transferred him to the Censorate and sent him back to his hometown in June 1391, with a condition that he could not seek public service for ten years. In the summer of 1399, after the Hongwu Emperor's death, Xie was able to secure a modest position (Hanlin Attendant, the lowest rank—9b) at Hanlin Academy, but he failed to impress his superiors and felt undervalued.

The turning point in Xie's career came with the accession of the Yongle Emperor in the summer of 1402. He is believed to have authored the proclamation announcing the Yongle Emperor's accession to the throne, which helped him gain favor with the new ruler. In August 1402, the Yongle Emperor appointed him as his grand secretary, making him the first of seven grand secretaries since the end of 1402. He was considered the most talented and influential among them. Within a few months, he went from being an insignificant official to one of the monarch's closest advisors. In addition to managing the regular administration, he also played a key role in promoting the Yongle Emperor's policies in education and culture. He was heavily involved in revising the Taizu Shilu (Veritable Records of Emperor Taizu, i.e. the Hongwu Emperor), which aimed to substantiate and justify the Yongle Emperor's claim to the throne. He also participated in the compilation of the Yongle Encyclopedia and, in 1404, along with his colleague Grand Secretary Huang Huai, he oversaw the official examinations in the capital (Nanjing). In May of the same year, he became the head of the Imperial University.

In addition to his high political position, he also gained recognition as a poet and was considered a leading representative of the so-called "cabinet style poetry". His calligraphy was highly admired for its perfection, and he was also known for his expertise in genealogy and history. He was appreciated for his classic yet fresh literary style.

In 1404, Xie strongly advocated for the appointment of the Emperor's eldest son, Zhu Gaochi, as the crown prince. As a result, the grand secretaries began working closely with the crown prince, while also facing animosity from the Emperor's second son, Zhu Gaoxu. In the spring of 1407, Zhu Gaoxu accused Xie of favoring Jiangxi natives in the examinations and because Xie also opposed the war in Đại Việt (present-day northern Vietnam), he was demoted (from the 5a to the 4b rank) and sent to Guangxi as an assistant to the head of a provincial administrative office. The following year, he was transferred even further south to Jiaozhi Province (conquered Đại Việt). Xie returned to the capital three years later, in early 1411, where he was received by the crown prince while the Emperor was in the north. Zhu Gaoxu saw this reception as a violation of the rules and had Xie arrested in June 1411. His family were deported to Liaodong. He was murdered by Embroidered Uniform Guard in 1415.

After the death of the Yongle Emperor, Xie was gradually rehabilitated. In 1424, his family was able to return from exile, and in 1436, they regained their confiscated property. In 1465, the Chenghua Emperor officially rehabilitated Xie, and in January 1591, the Wanli Emperor posthumously honored him with the name Wenyi (文毅) as an expression of extraordinary recognition.
