= Zhu Gaosui =

Chinese prince (1383–1431)

Zhu Gaosui 朱高燧
- Prince of Zhao
- Born: 19 January 1383
- Died: 2 October 1431 (aged 48)
Posthumous name
- Prince Jian of Zhao (Note: Simplified Chinese: 赵简王; traditional Chinese: 趙簡王; pinyin: Zhào Jiǎnwáng)
- House: Zhu
- Father: Yongle Emperor
- Mother: Empress Xu

Chinese name
- Chinese: 朱高燧
Transcriptions
Standard Mandarin
- Hanyu Pinyin: Zhū Gāosuì
- Wade–Giles: Chu^{1} Kao^{1}-sui^{4}
- IPA: [ʈʂú káʊ.swêɪ]

Zhu Gaosui (19 January 1383 – 2 October 1431) was a prince of the Ming dynasty of China. He was the third son of the Yongle Emperor and Empress Xu.

== Biography ==
Zhu Gaosui was born on 19 January 1383, as the third son of Zhu Di, Prince of Yan, and his wife Lady Xu. Zhu Di was the fourth son of the Hongwu Emperor (r. 1368–1398), the founder of China's Ming dynasty. Zhu Gaosui had two elder brothers, Zhu Gaochi and Zhu Gaoxu, and a younger brother Zhu Gaoxi. Zhu Gaoxi died in infancy. Zhu Gaosui was known to possess mediocre character and abilities. Along with Zhu Gaoxu, he took part in military campaigns during the civil war of 1399–1402, which ultimately led to his father's ascension to the throne as the Yongle Emperor. In 1404, he was bestowed with the title of Prince of Zhao (趙王) and resided in Beijing. Later, in 1405, he was entrusted with military command in the city.

In 1426, Zhu Gaosui became involved in a rebellion led by Zhu Gaoxu against their nephew, the Xuande Emperor, who was the eldest son and successor of their elder brother. Despite his involvement, he was not punished in the interest of maintaining stability within the state. He died on 2 October 1431, and his title of Prince of Zhao was inherited by his second son, Zhu Zhanque (朱瞻塙; 1413–1455), as his eldest son, Zhu Zhanba (朱瞻坺; 1411–1427), had died a few years earlier. His third and youngest son, born in early 1413, died in infancy.

== Notes ==
Zhu Gaosui House of Zhu Born: 19 January 1383 Died: 5 October 1431
Chinese royalty
Vacant Title last held by Zhu Qi	Prince of Zhao; Second creation 1404–1431	Succeeded by Zhu Zhanque
