= Yongle Emperor =

Emperor of China from 1402 to 1424

Yongle Emperor 永樂帝
- Palace portrait on a hanging scroll

Emperor of the Ming dynasty
- Reign: 17 July 1402 – 12 August 1424
- Enthronement: 17 July 1402
- Predecessor: Jianwen Emperor
- Successor: Hongxi Emperor
- Born: 2 May 1360; Yingtian Prefecture, Yuan dynasty
- Died: 12 August 1424 (aged 64); Yumuchuan, Ming dynasty
- Burial: 8 January 1425; Chang Mausoleum, Ming tombs, Beijing
- Spouse: Empress Renxiaowen (m. 1376; died 1407)
- Issue Detail: Hongxi Emperor; Zhu Gaoxu, Prince of Han; Zhu Gaosui, Prince Jian of Zhao; Princess Yong'an
Era dates
- Yongle: (Note: Simplified Chinese: 永乐; traditional Chinese: 永樂; pinyin: Yǒnglè) 23 January 1403 – 19 January 1425
Posthumous name
- Emperor Titian Hongdao Gaoming Guangyun Shengwu Shengong Chunren Zhixiao Wen (Note: Simplified Chinese: 体天弘道高明广运圣武神功纯仁至孝文皇帝; traditional Chinese: 體天弘道高明廣運聖武神功純仁至孝文皇帝 (conferred by the Hongxi Emperor in 1424)); Emperor Qitian Hongdao Gaoming Zhaoyun Shengwu Shengong Chunren Zhixiao Wen (Note: Simplified Chinese: 启天弘道高明肇运圣武神功纯仁至孝文皇帝; traditional Chinese: 啓天弘道高明肇運聖武神功純仁至孝文皇帝 (changed by the Jiajing Emperor in 1538))
Temple name
- Taizong (Note: Chinese: 太宗; pinyin: Tàizōng (conferred by the Hongxi Emperor in 1424)); Chengzu (Note: Chinese: 成祖; pinyin: Chéngzǔ (changed by the Jiajing Emperor in 1538))
- House: Zhu
- Dynasty: Ming
- Father: Hongwu Emperor
- Mother: Empress Ma (disputed)

Chinese name
- Traditional Chinese: 永樂帝
- Simplified Chinese: 永乐帝
Transcriptions
Standard Mandarin
- Hanyu Pinyin: Yǒnglè Dì
- Wade–Giles: Yung^{3}-le^{4} Ti^{4}
- IPA: [jʊ̀ŋlɤ̂ tî]
Yue: Cantonese
- Jyutping: Wing5-lok6 dai3
- IPA: [wɪŋ˩˧lɔk̚˨ tɐj˧]
Southern Min
- Tâi-lô: Íng-lo̍k tē

The Yongle Emperor (2 May 1360 – 12 August 1424), personal name Zhu Di, (Note: Chinese: 朱棣; pinyin: Zhū Dì) was the third emperor of the Ming dynasty of China, reigning from 1402 to 1424. He was the fourth son of the Hongwu Emperor, the founder of the dynasty.

In 1370, Zhu Di was granted the title of Prince of Yan. By 1380, he had relocated to Beiping (present-day Beijing) and was responsible for protecting the northeastern borderlands. In the 1380s and 1390s, he proved himself to be a skilled military leader, gaining popularity among soldiers and achieving success as a statesman. In 1399, he rebelled against his nephew, the Jianwen Emperor, and launched a civil war known as the Jingnan campaign. After three years of intense fighting, he emerged victorious and declared himself emperor in 1402.

After ascending the throne, the Yongle Emperor elevated Beiping to the status of a second capital, diminishing the importance of Nanjing. Construction of the new capital between 1407 and 1420 employed hundreds of thousands of workers. He also supervised the reconstruction of the Grand Canal, essential for supplying Beijing and the northern armies. The Emperor strongly supported both Confucianism and Buddhism and sponsored the compilation of the vast Yongle Encyclopedia, employing around two thousand scholars. He also ordered Neo-Confucian texts to be systematized and used as textbooks for training officials. The civil service examinations, held every three years, produced qualified candidates for government service. Unlike his father, he avoided frequent purges, resulting in longer ministerial tenures and a more professional, stable administration.

The Emperor made considerable efforts to reinforce the empire's hegemonic position in East Asia through an active foreign policy. Diplomatic missions and military expeditions were dispatched to regions both near and distant, including Manchuria, Korea, Japan, the Philippines, and the Timurid Empire in Central Asia. Maritime expeditions led by the eunuch admiral Zheng He extended even further, reaching the shores of Southeast Asia, India, Persia, and East Africa. The Mongols—including southeastern Uriankhai, eastern Mongols and western Oirats—remained the empire's greatest security threat, prompting the Ming court to alternately support and confront the various groups. The Emperor personally led five campaigns into Mongolia, and his decision to transfer the government from Nanjing to Beijing was driven largely by the need to closely monitor the unstable northern frontier. Although a skilled military leader, his wars were ultimately unsuccessful, as the campaign in Đại Việt lasted until the end of his reign and his Mongolian campaigns failed to secure China's northern border.

== Early life (1360–1398) ==
=== Childhood (1360–1370) ===
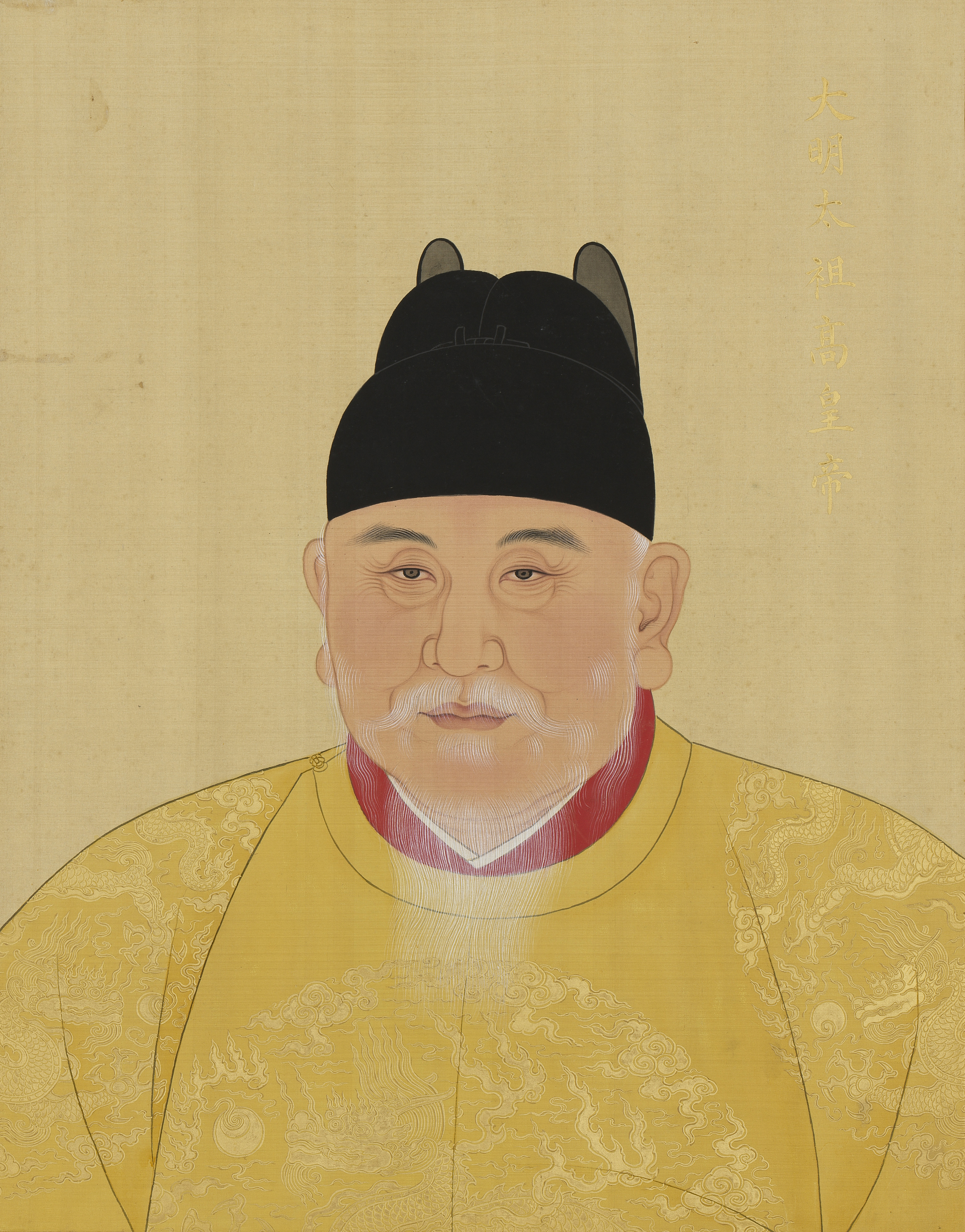
The Hongwu Emperor, the father of Zhu Di, in his old age, c. 1397

Zhu Di, the future Yongle Emperor, was born on 2 May 1360 as the fourth son of Zhu Yuanzhang. At the time, Zhu Yuanzhang was based in Nanjing and was a prominent rebel leader during the Red Turban Rebellion, an uprising in China against the Mongol-led Yuan dynasty. The rebellion sought to restore Han Chinese rule after decades of Mongol domination following the Yuan conquest of the Song in 1279. In 1368, Zhu Yuanzhang founded the Ming dynasty and became the Hongwu Emperor.

Ming official records, and Zhu Di himself, stated that his mother was the Hongwu Emperor's primary wife and empress, Lady Ma. Other sources suggest that his real mother was a concubine with the title Consort Gong, who was either Mongolian (from the Khongirad tribe) or possibly Korean. Zhu Di attempted to present himself as the Hongwu Emperor's legitimate successor by declaring himself and the Hongwu Emperor's fifth son, Zhu Su, as the only sons of Empress Ma in the 1403 edition of the official Veritable Records of Taizu. (Note: The Hongwu Emperor's Ancestral Instructions stipulated that imperial succession must follow primogeniture through the empress's direct male lineage, explicitly excluding sons born to concubines from eligibility for the throne.) This claim was questionable, as it was unlikely that the Hongwu Emperor would not name a son with the Empress as his successor during his lifetime. Therefore, in the later version of 1418, the eldest five sons—Zhu Biao, Zhu Shuang, Zhu Gang, Zhu Di, and Zhu Su—were all recognized as her children.

Zhu Di spent his childhood in Nanjing, where he and his siblings were raised with a strong emphasis on discipline and modesty. Among his siblings, (Note: The Hongwu Emperor had 26 sons and 16 daughters by his empress and numerous consorts.) he had a special fondness for his younger sister Princess Ningguo and his younger brothers Zhu Su and Zhu Fu. Zhu Su was only 15 months younger than Zhu Di, and they became close friends despite their contrasting personalities. While Zhu Di enjoyed activities such as archery and horseback riding, Zhu Su preferred studying literature and tending to plants.

The Hongwu Emperor took great care in the education of his sons, appointing leading scholars of the empire as their tutors. Initially, Song Lian was appointed as the teacher for the heir to the throne, and also gave lectures to the other princes. His successor, Kong Keren (孔克仁), who taught the Emperor's sons philosophy and ethics, had a significant influence on Zhu Di. His favorite subject was the history of the Han dynasty, particularly Emperors Gaozu and Wu of Han, but he often referenced examples from the life of Qin Shi Huang in his decrees as emperor.

=== Youth (1370–1380) ===
In 1368, the Emperor designated his eldest son, Zhu Biao, as heir to the throne. On 22 April 1370, he granted princely titles to the next nine sons, from the second to the tenth. Zhu Di received the title of Prince of Yan, with his fief located in Beiping (present-day Beijing). During the Mongol-led Yuan dynasty, Beiping served as the capital of China. After being conquered by the Ming dynasty in 1368, it became a crucial stronghold for the troops guarding the northern border and was also designated as the capital of Beiping Province.

At that time, Zhu Di came under the guidance of Hua Yunlong (Note: He held the second highest rank and served as the commissioner-in-chief of a military commission. For his participation in the campaign of 1370, he was appointed the Marquis of Huaian in June 1370. From February 1371, he governed the Beiping province; he was dismissed in 1374 and died on his way to Nanjing in the same year.) and Gao Xian, who became his principal mentors. Gao spent the next four to five years lecturing the prince on Confucian classics, history, agriculture, and irrigation. He also trained Zhu Di in poetry and prose writing, and instructed him in the principles of governance and the selection of subordinates. After Hua's death and Gao's dismissal, Fei Yu, Qiu Guang, Wang Wuban, and Zhu Fu took over Zhu Di's education. (Note: Zhu Fu served under the prince from 1373 to 1388, becoming his chief tutor in 1377. He was diligent and honorable, and had a great influence on the prince, becoming his confidant. In 1416, Zhu Di, as the Yongle Emperor, posthumously awarded him the title of minister.) Despite receiving a comprehensive education from esteemed teachers, Zhu Di's true passion lay in military affairs rather than scholarly study and palace discussions.

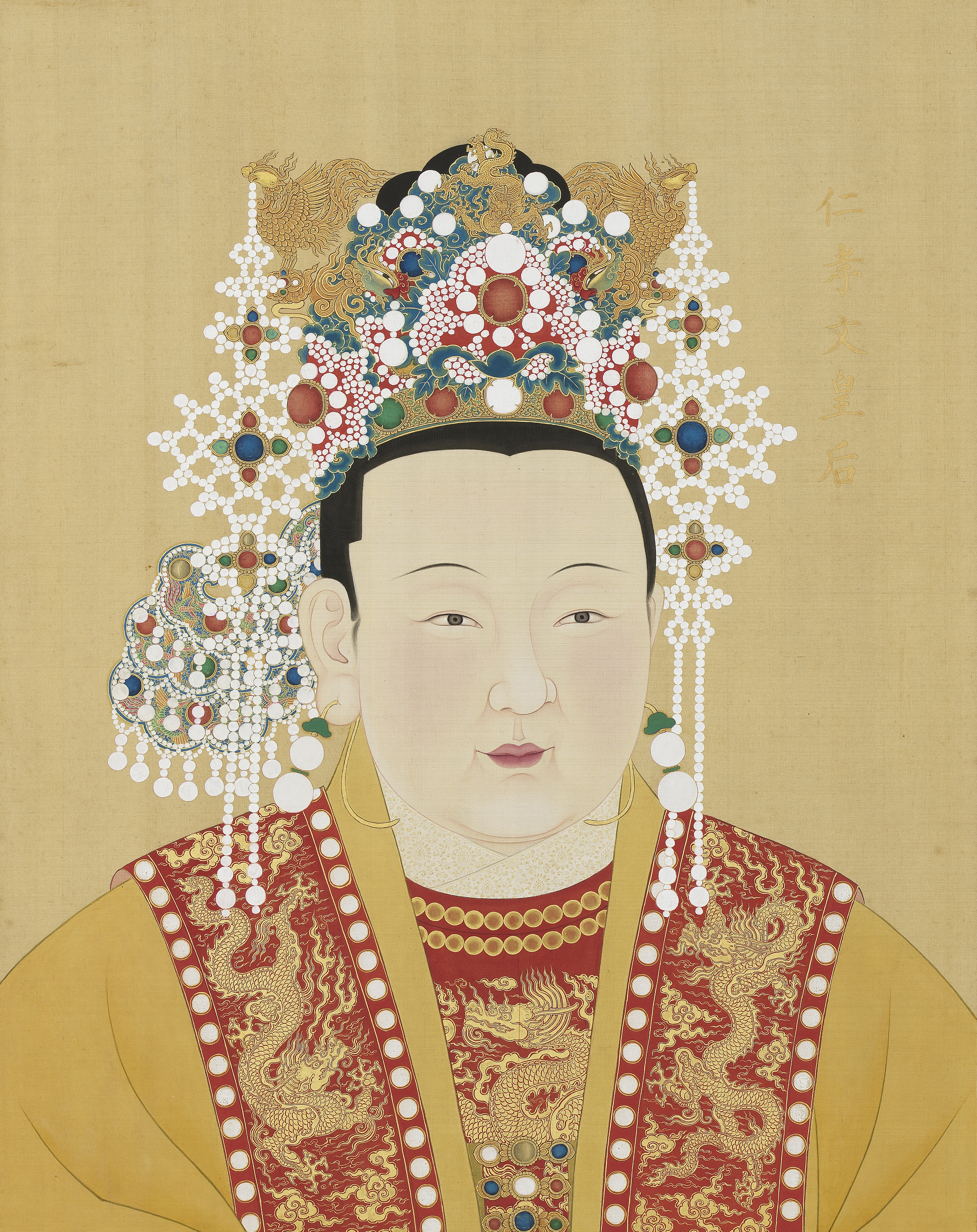
Portrait of Lady Xu, Zhu Di's wife, as empress

In early 1376, Zhu Di married the daughter of the senior Ming general Xu Da, who had played a significant role in the founding of the dynasty. Zhu Di's bride, Lady Xu, was two years younger than him and was known for her intelligence, decisiveness, and energy. The couple's marriage was political in nature, strengthening ties between their families, but they gradually developed a deep affection for one another over the next 31 years. Their first son, Zhu Gaochi, was born in August 1378. The couple had two more sons, Zhu Gaoxu in 1380 and Zhu Gaosui in 1383.

A few weeks after his wedding, Zhu Di traveled to Fengyang (then known as Zhongdu, the Central Capital), where he spent seven months in military training alongside his elder brothers Zhu Shuang and Zhu Gang. Two years later, he returned to Fengyang with his younger brothers Zhu Su, Zhu Zhen, and Zhu Fu, remaining there for another two years. During this period, he trained in command and combat and learned military logistics, including the acquisition and transport of supplies. He developed organizational abilities that he later applied effectively in warfare. He also disguised himself as an ordinary soldier to experience the lives of common people, and later recalled his years in Fengyang as the happiest of his life.

In 1376, Li Wenzhong (李文忠), the nephew and adopted son of the Hongwu Emperor and the official responsible for northern defense, was tasked with preparing Zhu Di's palace in Beiping. Using former Yuan imperial palaces, he provided Zhu Di with a residence that was larger and more heavily fortified than those of his brothers, many of whom lived in converted temples or local government buildings. Li Wenzhong also strengthened the city's defenses, a decision that proved significant during the civil war when his son, Li Jinglong, failed to capture Beiping in 1399.

=== Prince of Yan in Beiping (1380–1398) ===
In April 1380, at the age of 20, Zhu Di moved to Beiping, where he encountered strong Mongolian cultural influences that the government sought to suppress by banning Mongolian customs, clothing, and names. The city had largely recovered from the famines and wars of the 1350s and 1360s and was undergoing renewed growth. It housed hundreds of thousands of soldiers, along with provincial officials, artisans, and laborers from across the empire. The primary challenge for local authorities was ensuring an adequate food supply. To address this, peasants were resettled in the north, soldiers and convicts were assigned to farm the land, and merchants were granted salt-trading licenses in exchange for transporting grain to the region. (Note: Salt was then purchased from producers and sold to the population with a large profit.) The government also shipped food supplies directly to the city.

Zhu Di's interest in military affairs was reflected in his personal training of his guard troops. He used these forces to balance the power of the provincial commander, who could not mobilize troops without authorization from the Emperor and approval from the prince. Zhu Di was free to deploy his own forces independently. In 1381, he had his first experience in the field when he joined his father-in-law Xu Da's campaign against the Mongols, led by Nayur Buqa.

In the 1380s, Zhu Di served in border defense under the leadership of Xu Da, who was succeeded by Fu Youde after Xu's death in 1385. In 1387, Zhu Di participated in a successful attack on the Mongols in Liaodong, led by Feng Sheng. The following year, a Ming army led by Lan Yu made a foray into eastern Mongolia and defeated the Mongol khan Tögüs Temür, capturing many prisoners and horses. However, both generals were accused of mistreating captives and misappropriating booty, which the prince reported to the Emperor.

In January 1390, the Emperor entrusted his sons with independent command for the first time. He gave Zhu Gang, Zhu Di, and Zhu Fu the task of leading a punitive expedition against the Mongol commanders Nayur Buqa and Alu Temür, who were threatening Shanxi and Gansu. Zhu Di demonstrated excellent command skills when he defeated and captured both Mongol commanders in battle. They then served under him with their troops. The Emperor appreciated Zhu Di's success over Zhu Gang's hesitancy. Zhu Di continued to lead armies into battle against the Mongols repeatedly and with great success.

The Emperor's heir, Zhu Biao, died in 1392, prompting discussions at court over the succession. The principle of primogeniture, supported by Hanlin Academy scholars and senior officials, ultimately prevailed. The Emperor named Zhu Biao's son Zhu Yunwen as the new heir, and appointed the generals Feng Sheng, Fu Youde, and Lan Yu as his grandson's tutors. All three generals were related to Zhu Yunwen. After a recommendation by Zhu Di, the Hongwu Emperor began to suspect the generals of treason. Zhu Di had a poor relationship with Lan, and according to historian Wang Shizhen (1526–1590), he played a role in Lan's execution in March 1393. The other two generals died under unclear circumstances around 1394–1395. They were subsequently replaced by princes. In 1393, the Emperor gave Zhu Gang military command of Shanxi province and Zhu Di command of Beiping province. Zhu Shuang, the commander of Shaanxi, died in 1395.

The Emperor was deeply affected by the death of his two eldest sons and the strained relations between his remaining sons and his heir. He decided to revise the rules governing the imperial family, and he significantly limited the rights of the princes. (Note: The prince's right to visit his brothers after three or five years was lost. The government now appointed not only the highest but all officials of the princely households. The judicial authority of the princes was limited. The maximum stipend for princes was reduced from 50,000 dan of grain to 10,000 in order to relieve the state treasury.) These changes had little impact on Zhu Di's status as they did not affect his main area of expertise—the military, and he was cautious not to give any reason for criticism. For example, he did not object to the execution of his generals Nayur Buqa and Alu Temür on charges of treason. He also exercised caution in diplomatic relations, such as when he welcomed Korean delegations passing through Beiping, to avoid any indication of disrespect towards the Emperor's authority.

Out of the six princes (Note: They were, listed by age: Zhu Gang, Prince of Jin in Taiyuan; Zhu Di, Prince of Yan in Beiping; Zhu Gui, Prince of Dai in Datong; Zhu Zhi, Prince of Liao in Guangning (present-day Beizhen, Liaoning); Zhu Quan, Prince of Ning in Daning; and Zhu Hui, Prince of Gu in Xuanfu.) responsible for guarding the northern border, Zhu Di was the second oldest and emerged as the dominant prince in the north. He operated across a vast territory stretching from Liaodong to the bend of the Yellow River. His aggressive approach was demonstrated in the summer of 1396, when he defeated the Mongols led by Polin Temür at Daning (present-day Chengde, Hebei). He and Zhu Gang went on a raid several hundred kilometers north of the Great Wall, earning them a sharp reprimand from their father. In April 1398, Zhu Gang died, leaving Zhu Di as the undisputed leader of the northern border defense. Two months later, the Hongwu Emperor also died.

== Rise to power (1398–1402) ==
=== Conflict with the Jianwen Emperor (1398–1399) ===
After the death of the Hongwu Emperor, Zhu Yunwen ascended the throne as the Jianwen Emperor. His closest advisors immediately began revising the Hongwu Emperor's reforms. Their most significant decision was an attempt to limit and eventually eliminate the power of the Hongwu Emperor's sons, who controlled a significant portion of the empire's military forces. The government employed various methods to remove five of the princes, (Note: Zhu Su, Zhu Gui, Zhu Bo, Zhu Fu and Zhu Bian.) including exile, house arrest, and forced suicide.

The government regarded Zhu Di as the most dangerous of the princes. Consequently, the court treated him cautiously and sought to limit his power by replacing military commanders in the northeast with generals loyal to the Jianwen Emperor and transferring 15,000 troops away from his command in Beiping. Successful in convincing the Emperor of his loyalty, Zhu Di petitioned for leniency toward his brother Zhu Su and asked that his sons be allowed to return from Nanjing, where they had remained since the Hongwu Emperor's funeral as de facto hostages. In June 1399, the Emperor's advisor Huang Zicheng persuaded him that releasing Zhu Di's sons would help ease tensions.

In early August 1399, Zhu Di used the arrest of two of his officials as a pretext for rebellion. He claimed that he was rising up to protect the Emperor from the corrupt court officials. With the support of Beiping dignitaries, (Note: Li Youzhi, Beiping surveillance commissioner, and Zhang Xin (張信), Beiping regional military commissioner.) he gained control of the city's garrison and occupied the surrounding prefectures and counties. He attempted to justify his actions through letters sent to the court in August and December 1399, as well as through a public statement.

Zhu Di repeatedly stated that he had no ambition for the throne. However, he believed it was his duty as the Hongwu Emperor's eldest surviving son to restore laws and order that had been undermined by the Jianwen government. He accused the Jianwen Emperor and his advisors of concealing information about his father's illness and preventing him from attending the funeral. The prince also criticized their harsh treatment of his brothers. Claiming to act in self-defense against the Emperor's corrupt ministers, Zhu Di described his actions as the Jingnan campaign—a campaign to clear away disorders.

=== Civil war (1399–1402) ===
At the start of the war, Zhu Di commanded a force of 100,000 soldiers and only held control over the immediate area surrounding Beiping. Despite the Nanjing government's larger number of armies and greater material resources, Zhu Di's soldiers were of higher quality and he possessed a strong Mongol cavalry. His military leadership skills were superior to the indecisiveness and lack of coordination displayed by the government's generals.

In September 1399, a government army of 130,000 soldiers under the command of the veteran general Geng Bingwen marched towards Zhending, a city southwest of Beiping. By the end of the month, the army had suffered a decisive defeat. The court appointed a new commander, Li Jinglong, who led a new army to besiege Beiping on 12 November. Zhu Di, who had been gathering troops in the northeast, swiftly returned and defeated the surprised Li army. The soldiers from the south, who were not accustomed to the cold weather, were forced to retreat to Dezhou in Shandong.

Zhu Di's army fought in the southern part of Beiping province and northwestern Shandong, with varying levels of success in 1400. In the spring, he led a successful attack into Datong, defeating Li Jinglong near Baoding in May and outside Dezhou in June, but due to concerns about potential enemy reinforcements, Zhu Di ended the siege of Jinan in September and retreated to Beiping. Li Jinglong's lackluster performance led the government to appoint Sheng Yong as the new commander of the counterinsurgency army.

The following year, Zhu Di attempted to weaken the enemy by attacking smaller units, which disrupted the supply of government troops. Both sides then focused on breaking through along the Grand Canal. Zhu Di suffered a defeat at Dongchang in January, but was victorious at Jia River in April. The front continued to move back and forth for the rest of the year.

By 1402, Zhu Di had abandoned further advances along the Grand Canal and instead moved west, bypassing Dezhou. He conquered Xuzhou in early March. The government troops retreated south to Zhili and were repeatedly defeated. The rebels reached the north bank of the Yangtze River in July. When the commander of the government fleet defected to Zhu Di's side, the rebel army crossed the river without resistance and advanced on Nanjing. The betrayal of Zhu Di's brother Zhu Hui and cousin Li Jinglong allowed him to capture the capital on 13 July 1402 with little resistance. In the ensuing clashes, the imperial palace burned down. Three bodies found at the burnt palace were later announced to be those of the Emperor, his wife, and their son. (Note: Beginning in the Jiajing era (1522–1567), non-state historians who were sympathetic to the Jianwen Emperor propagated a folk legend in their writings that he survived the palace fire and lived in anonymity as a Buddhist monk.)

=== Accession to the throne (1402) ===
Zhu Di ascended the throne on 17 July 1402, officially succeeding his father. As late as the summer of 1402, the new emperor was still dealing with the Jianwen Emperor's followers, who denied the legitimacy of Zhu Di's rule. He responded by erasing the Jianwen Emperor's reign from history. This included abolishing the Jianwen era and extending the Hongwu era until the end of 1402. He then adopted Yongle ("perpetual happiness") as his own era name. He abolished the reforms and laws implemented by the Jianwen government, restored the titles and privileges of the princes, and destroyed government archives (with the exception of financial and military records). Several of the Jianwen Emperor's supporters, such as Fang Xiaoru and Liu Jing (劉璟), refused to be involved in the new emperor's administration, and he had them executed. Huang Zicheng and Qi Tai, the leading advocates of the policy to reduce the princes' power, were executed along with their family members, teachers, students, and followers. Many others were imprisoned or exiled to the frontier, and tens of thousands of people were purged.

The Yongle Emperor had the Veritable Records of Taizu rewritten. His government disapproved of the original version, created in 1402 at the court of the Jianwen Emperor, and he remained dissatisfied with a revised version completed in July 1403. The final version, completed in June 1418, stressed the Yongle Emperor's claim to the throne. It included claims that he was the son of Empress Ma, a potential successor to the Hongwu Emperor, the intended regent of the Jianwen Emperor, and an exceptionally talented military leader favored by his father.

== Domestic policy ==
=== Government and administration ===
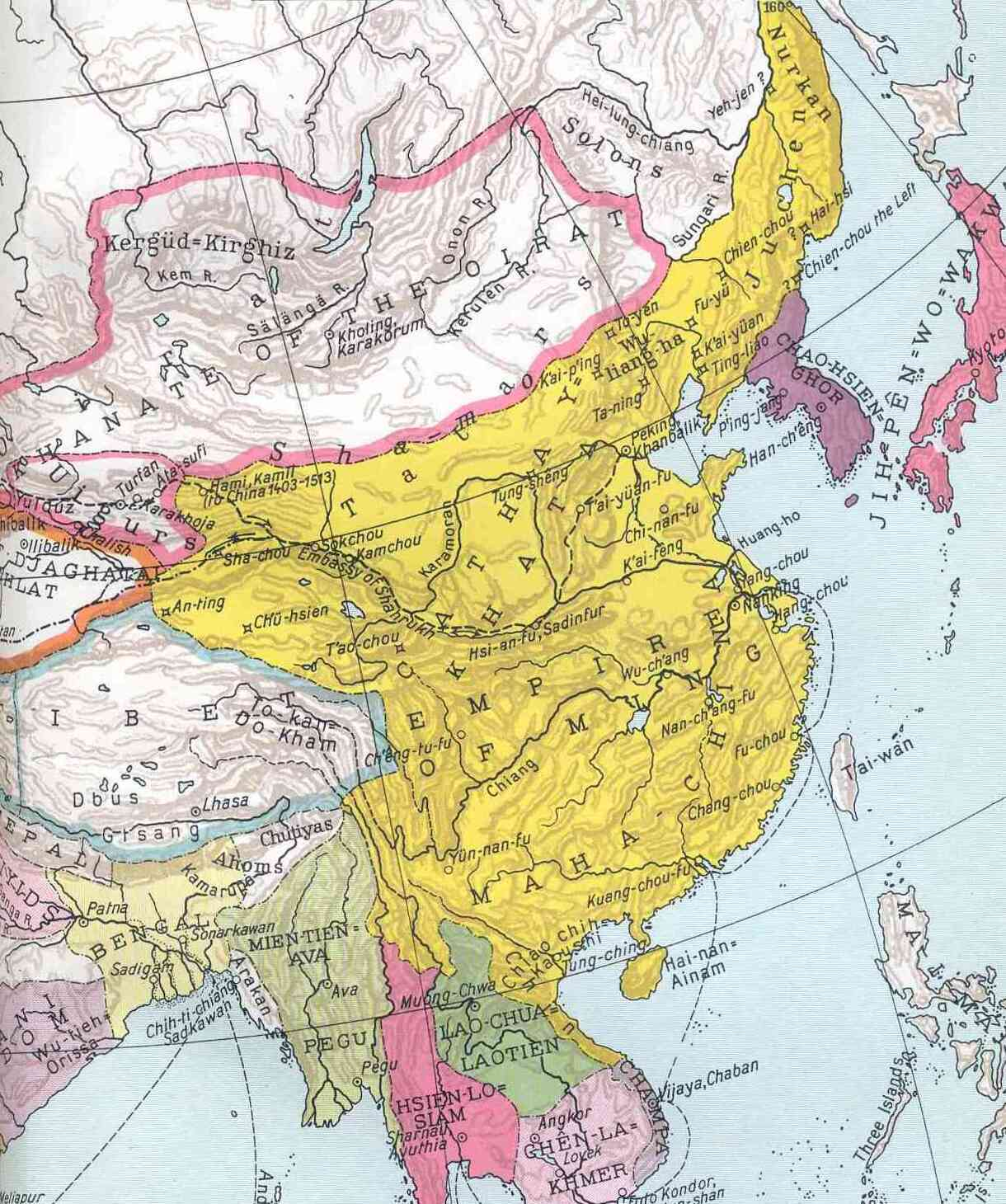
Ming territory in 1415, during the Yongle Emperor's reign

Historians such as Chan Hok-lam, Edward Dreyer, and Frederick Mote have often described the reign of the Yongle Emperor as the "second founding" of the Ming dynasty, reflecting the major changes he introduced to his father's political system. He often ruled "from horseback", traveling between the two capitals in a manner reminiscent of the Yuan emperors. This approach, however, was criticized by officials who feared the growing influence of court eunuchs and military elites, whose power depended on imperial favor.

In contrast to the frequent turnover of officials under the Hongwu Emperor, the upper levels of the Yongle Emperor's administration remained relatively stable. Although the Emperor occasionally imprisoned ministers, the large-scale purges characteristic of the Hongwu era did not recur. Known for imposing harsh punishments on failure, he nonetheless readily rewarded capable officials. Eunuchs and generals handled major political affairs, while officials managed finance, judicial matters, and routine administration. Administrative fragmentation, a characteristic feature of the Hongwu Emperor's reign, declined, allowing the Emperor to devote less attention to day-to-day details. (Note: The Hongwu Emperor abolished the Central Secretariat in 1380 and centralized authority entirely in his own hands, personally overseeing even minor administrative matters. In contrast, the Yongle Emperor recognized the impracticality of such an approach. He established the Grand Secretariat, delegating routine tasks to its members and institutionalizing their role in drafting documents and managing daily governance.)

The political influence of the bureaucratic apparatus gradually increased. The most significant development was the emergence of the Grand Secretariat, which played a crucial role in the politics of the Yongle Emperor's successors. Under the leadership of the grand secretaries, officials gained control of the government.

==== Princes and generals ====
The Emperor restored the titles of the princes of Zhou, Qi, and Min, which had been abolished by the Jianwen Emperor, but these titles did not come with the same power and authority as before. During the latter half of his reign, the Yongle Emperor accused many of these princes of committing crimes and punished them by removing their personal guards. He had previously condemned the same actions when they were carried out by the Jianwen Emperor. In order to reduce political threats, the Yongle Emperor relocated several border princes from the north to central and southern China. (Note: For example, Zhu Hui, Prince of Gu, was relocated from Xuanfu to Changsha, while Zhu Quan, Prince of Ning, was moved from Daning to Nanchang.) By the end of his reign, the princes had lost much of their political influence.

One of the Yongle Emperor's first actions upon assuming the throne was to reorganize the military command. He promoted loyal generals and granted them titles and ranks. In October 1402, he appointed two dukes (gong; 公)—the generals Qiu Fu and Zhu Neng (朱能)—as well as 14 marquises (hou; 侯) and nine counts (bo; 伯). In addition, one dukedom and three countships were granted to dignitaries who had defected to his side before the fall of Nanjing—Li Jinglong, Chen Xuan (陳瑄), Ru Chang (茹瑺), and Wang Zuo (王佐). In June 1403, nine lower-ranking generals from the civil war were also appointed as marquises or counts. In the following years, meritorious military leaders from the campaigns against the Mongols, including those of Mongolian origin, were also granted the titles of duke, marquis, and count.

The Emperor established a new hereditary military nobility. Although their stipends from the state treasury were relatively modest, (Note: Annual stipends amounted to 2,200–2,500 dan of grain for dukes, 800–1,500 dan for marquises, and approximately 1,000 dan for counts. One dan was equivalent to about 107 liters.) the prestige attached to these titles was far more important. They commanded armies in the Emperor's name, at a time when the princes had been stripped of political influence. This nobility also enjoyed immunity from punishment by local authorities, though it differed significantly from the system of the Hongwu era. Under Hongwu, generals who had been the Emperor's comrades-in-arms held higher status, maintained personal followings, and exercised substantial regional power, which eventually posed a threat and led to their elimination. In contrast, during the Yongle era, members of the military nobility did not participate in civil or regional administration and were not assigned permanent military units. Instead, they led armies assembled on an ad hoc basis. The Emperor frequently led campaigns in person alongside them, strengthening personal bonds. The military nobility remained closely tied to and loyal to the Emperor. Large-scale purges were unnecessary, and punishments were generally limited to individuals who failed in their duties. The military nobility played a prominent role during the reign and participated in many of its military campaigns.

==== Officials and authorities ====
The Emperor reorganized the civilian administration, gaining the support of officials who had often served under the previous government. He restored the administrative structure of the Hongwu era but introduced several modifications. In 1402, the Grand Secretariat was created to act as an intermediary between the Emperor and the government, partially replacing the Central Secretariat that had been abolished in 1380. Despite their informal position, the grand secretaries quickly gained dominance in the civil administration.

The Grand Secretariat was established in August 1402, when the Emperor began addressing administrative affairs during working dinners with Huang Huai and Xie Jin after the evening audience. In September 1402, he appointed five additional grand secretaries: Hu Guang, Yang Rong, Yang Shiqi, Jin Youzi, and Hu Yan. (Note: Xie Jin initially headed the Grand Secretariat until his transfer to Guangxi in 1407 and was succeeded by Hu Guang, who served until his death in 1418. Huang Huai remained in office until his imprisonment in 1414, while Hu Yan left the Grand Secretariat in 1404 to head the Imperial University. Yang Rong, Yang Shiqi, and Jin Youzi continued to serve throughout the Yongle Emperor's reign, with Yang Rong assuming leadership of the Grand Secretariat after Hu Guang's death.) All seven were well educated and experienced administrators who had previously served in lower posts under the Jianwen administration. (Note: Huang Huai was from Zhejiang, Yang Rong from Fujian, and the remaining officials from Jiangxi. Jiangxi was known for its high level of education, with 16 out of the top 30 students in the palace examination of 1400 coming from this province. However, many officials from Jiangxi, particularly Huang Zicheng, were associated with the Jianwen government and responsible for the civil war. After 1402, they refused to acknowledge the legitimacy of the Yongle Emperor. In an attempt to appease this resistance, the Emperor welcomed local elites into his court, but the young Hanlin scholars remained steadfast in their loyalty.) Their formal rank was relatively low, but the Emperor granted them prestigious titles within the household of the heir apparent. Over time, the grand secretaries evolved from clerks handling correspondence into influential political figures who proposed policy solutions. Their close access to the Emperor gave them an advantage over ministers, and some even accompanied him on his campaigns against the Mongols. During this period, the Emperor's son and heir, Zhu Gaochi, governed the empire with the support of the grand secretaries and selected ministers. Zhu Gaochi formed a close relationship with these officials and became the de facto representative of the official bureaucracy.

The Yongle Emperor was careful in selecting senior officials for the state administration, including grand secretaries and key ministers. He placed special trust in those who had supported him during the civil war, such as Jin Zhong (金忠), Guo Zi (郭資), Lü Zhen (呂震), and Wu Zhong (吳中). These ministers, drawn from across China, were all well educated and capable administrators. Among them, Minister of Revenue Xia Yuanji enjoyed the Emperor's greatest confidence. Xia promoted fiscal restraint and the use of resources for the benefit of the population, earning the Emperor's respect for his integrity. Xia held office for 19 years until 1421, when he, together with Minister of Justice Wu Zhong and Minister of War Fang Bin, opposed the costly Mongol campaign. Despite their protest, the Emperor proceeded with the campaign; Fang committed suicide, while Wu and Xia were imprisoned. Following the Yongle Emperor's death, they were rehabilitated and restored to office. Other long-serving ministers included Jian Yi (蹇義), Song Li (宋禮), and Liu Quan (劉觀). Throughout most of the Yongle era, the leadership of four out of the Six Ministries (Personnel, Revenue, Rites, and Works) showed remarkable stability, with the same individual ministers typically heading each respective office for extended periods. Several ministers continued to serve in their positions even after the Yongle Emperor's death.

The regular cycle of civil service examinations also contributed to the improvement and stabilization of administration at lower levels. In the second decade of the Yongle Emperor's reign, the examinations were held every three years. A total of 1,833 individuals passed the examinations in the capital, and the majority of these graduates were appointed to government positions. The Imperial University, which was previously responsible for selecting officials, lost its significance and became a place for candidates to study for the palace examinations. By the end of the Yongle Emperor's reign, the Ministry of Personnel had a sufficient number of examination graduates to fill important positions at the county level and above.

==== Eunuchs ====
The Yongle Emperor relied heavily on eunuchs, more so than his father did. He even recruited eunuchs from the Jianwen era, with whom he had been associated during the civil war. These eunuchs came from various backgrounds, including Mongolian, Central Asian, Jurchen, and Korean. In addition to their duties within the Forbidden City, the Yongle Emperor trusted their unwavering loyalty and often assigned them tasks outside the palace's walls, such as surveillance and intelligence gathering.

Eunuchs also held positions of military command and led diplomatic missions. They were well-known, unpopular, and feared as the Emperor's secret agents responsible for monitoring both civilian and military officials. While they were known for exposing corrupt officials, they also had a reputation for abusing their power and succumbing to corruption themselves. In 1420, a special investigation office was established, informally known as the "Eastern Depot" due to its location in the palace. This office was responsible for overseeing the judiciary, but it became infamous for its role in the disappearance of individuals. Stories of innocent imprisonment, torture, and unexplained deaths involving the office circulated until the end of the dynasty.

==== Succession struggle ====
The Yongle Emperor had four sons. The first three were born to Empress Xu; the fourth, Zhu Gaoxi, died in infancy. The eldest son, Zhu Gaochi, was not physically fit and instead of warfare, he focused on literature and poetry. The second son, Zhu Gaoxu, was tall and strong, a successful warrior, but the third son, Zhu Gaosui, was mediocre in character and ability.

Many influential officials, including Qiu Fu, suggested that Zhu Gaoxu should be the heir to the throne. They argued for his prowess and military skills, citing his past actions of saving his father from danger and turning the tide of battles during the civil war. Grand Secretary Xie Jin disagreed and argued that the people would admire Zhu Gaochi for his humanity. He also reminded the Emperor of the future accession of Zhu Zhanji, the Emperor's favorite grandson and Zhu Gaochi's eldest son. The Emperor eventually designated Zhu Gaochi as heir to the throne on 9 May 1404, and appointed Qiu Fu as his tutor the following day.

At the same time, the Emperor appointed Zhu Gaoxu as the Prince of Han in Yunnan, a distant southwestern province, and Zhu Gaosui as the Prince of Zhao in Beijing. Zhu Gaoxu refused to depart for Yunnan, and the Emperor eventually relented, allowing tensions between his first and second sons to intensify. In the spring of 1407, Zhu Gaoxu succeeded in slandering Xie Jin, who was accused of showing favoritism towards Jiangxi natives in the examinations. Xie was then transferred to the province and later imprisoned. In 1414, when the Emperor returned from his campaign in Mongolia, members of Zhu Gaochi's entourage were accused of arriving late to the welcoming ceremony. Zhu Gaoxu urged his father to punish them, and several of Zhu Gaochi's advisors, including the grand secretaries Yang Shiqi and Huang Huai, were imprisoned. Yang eventually cleared his name and resumed his position, but Huang remained imprisoned until the end of the Yongle era. In 1416, the Emperor gave Zhu Gaoxu a new fief in Qingzhou Prefecture in Shandong. Once again, he refused to leave, which led his father to reprimand him. He then began to raise his own army and even had an army officer killed. His father stripped him of his titles, demoted him to a common subject, and later imprisoned him. The following year, he was deported to Shandong.

=== The new capital ===
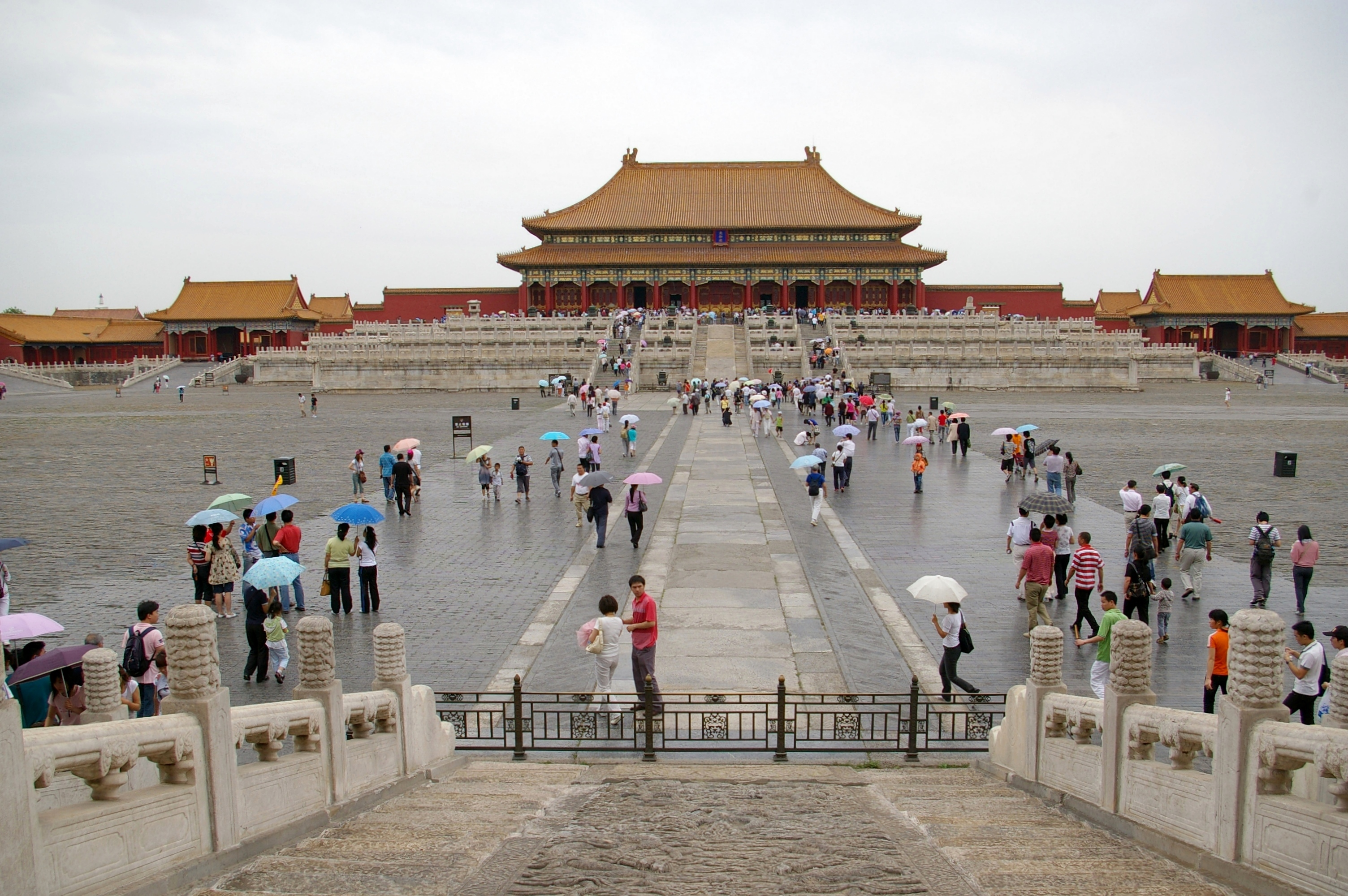
The Hall of Revering Heaven in the Forbidden City, Beijing. The Forbidden City, a 72-hectare complex of palaces and buildings, served as the imperial residence of the Ming emperors from 1420 onward. The current buildings of the palace complex are the result of restorations during the Qing dynasty, which did not significantly alter the appearance of the Ming constructions.

The Yongle Emperor's most significant accomplishment was the relocation of the capital from Nanjing (Southern Capital; then officially known as Yingtian) (Note: During the Ming dynasty, Nanjing was known as Yingtian, while Nanjing (unofficially Nanzhili) referred to the metropolitan area governed by Nanjing authorities since 1421. This area encompassed the present-day Anhui and Jiangsu provinces.) to Beijing (Northern Capital), which had been known as Beiping (Pacified North) until 1403. The idea of moving the capital from Nanjing to the north was first considered by the Hongwu Emperor in the early 1390s. Despite Nanjing's proximity to the empire's economic center in the Yangtze Delta, both the Hongwu and Yongle emperors faced the challenge of governing the empire's northern and western borders from a great distance, which required a significant amount of attention. Additionally, the Yongle Emperor likely regarded Beijing as the center of his personal power, whereas he remained something of an outsider in Nanjing. Beijing was strategically located on the northern border, accessible by the Grand Canal and in close proximity to the sea, making it a convenient location for supplies. Its history as the capital of the Liao, Jin, and Yuan dynasties also added to its significance.

The relocation of the capital was a demanding undertaking that required the large-scale mobilization of people and resources from across the empire. In February 1403, the Emperor initiated the move by designating Beijing as a secondary capital. The city was formally renamed Shuntian (Obedient to Heaven), but it continued to be commonly known as Beijing. He appointed his eldest son, Zhu Gaochi, to administer the city and province and established branches of central ministries and chief military commissions there. In 1404, 10,000 families from Shanxi were relocated to the city, and Beijing and its surrounding areas were granted a two-year tax exemption. The following year, more than 120,000 landless households from the Yangtze Delta were moved north, and construction of government buildings began. Timber was harvested from forests in Jiangxi, Huguang, Zhejiang, Shanxi, and Sichuan to supply the palaces in Beijing. Although artisans and laborers were dispatched from across the empire, construction progressed slowly due to supply constraints. The Emperor returned to northern China in March 1409, following the end of the first Mongol campaign. When he returned to Nanjing the following year, officials criticized the excessive expenditure on construction in Beijing, leading to reduced spending and a slowdown in construction that lasted several years.

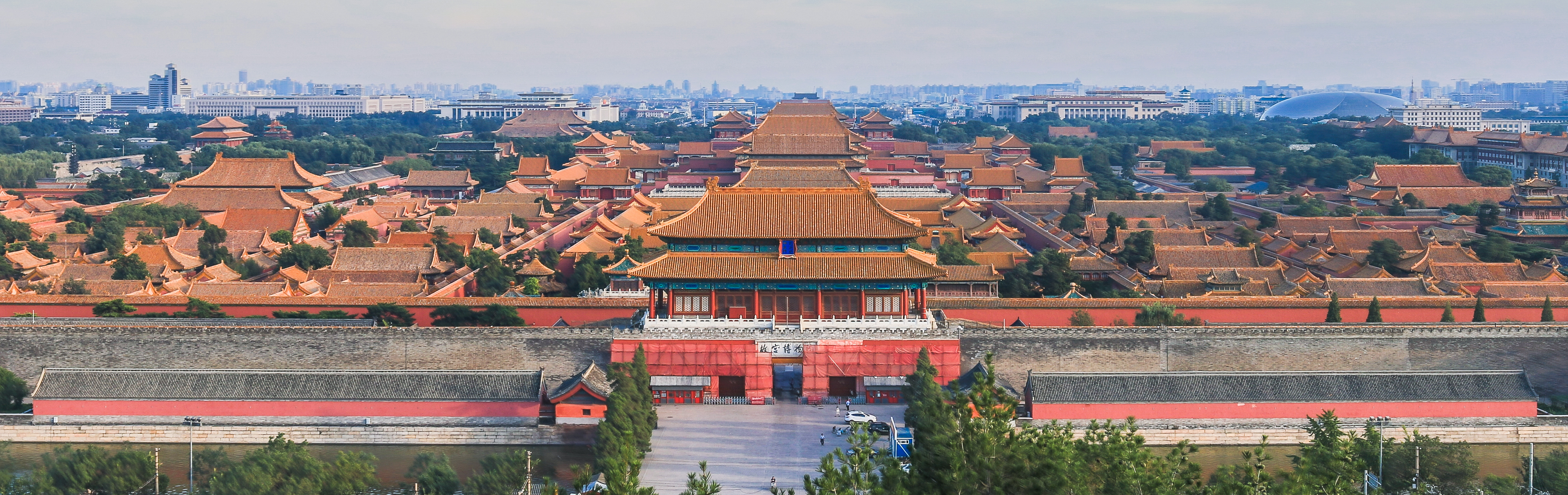
Panorama of the Forbidden City in Beijing

From 1414 to the end of 1416, the Emperor remained in Beijing during the campaign in Mongolia. The reconstruction of the Grand Canal was completed in 1415, which greatly aided in the supply of the north. Construction then resumed at a faster pace. Estimates place the number of workers involved in building the city at several hundred thousand. (Note: According to American historian Patricia Ebrey, hundreds of thousands of workers were involved in the construction of Beijing. Historian Ray Huang estimates that there were 100,000 artisans and 1 million laborers involved in the project.) The chief architects and engineers included Cai Xin (蔡信), Nguyễn An (a Viet eunuch), Kuai Xiang and Lu Xiang (陸祥). By the end of 1417, most of the palaces were completed, but construction on the walls continued. In 1420, the city was deemed ready for the relocation of the government. On 28 October 1420, Beijing was officially declared the principal capital of the empire, and by February 1421, ministries and other government agencies had relocated to Beijing. The Beijing authorities administered the empire from 1421. Some ministries remained in Nanjing, but their powers were limited to the southern metropolitan area and held little political significance. The cost of supplying Beijing, which was located far from the economically developed regions of the country, was a constant burden on the state treasury.

In 1421, a famine broke out in the northern provinces. At the same time, three major audience halls in the newly built Forbidden City were destroyed by fire. The Emperor regarded the event as a sign of Heaven's displeasure. He called upon government officials to critique the mistakes of the government. A junior secretary named Xiao Yi strongly criticized the decision to build the capital in the north and was subsequently executed. This effectively silenced any further discussion on the matter.

=== Grand Canal ===
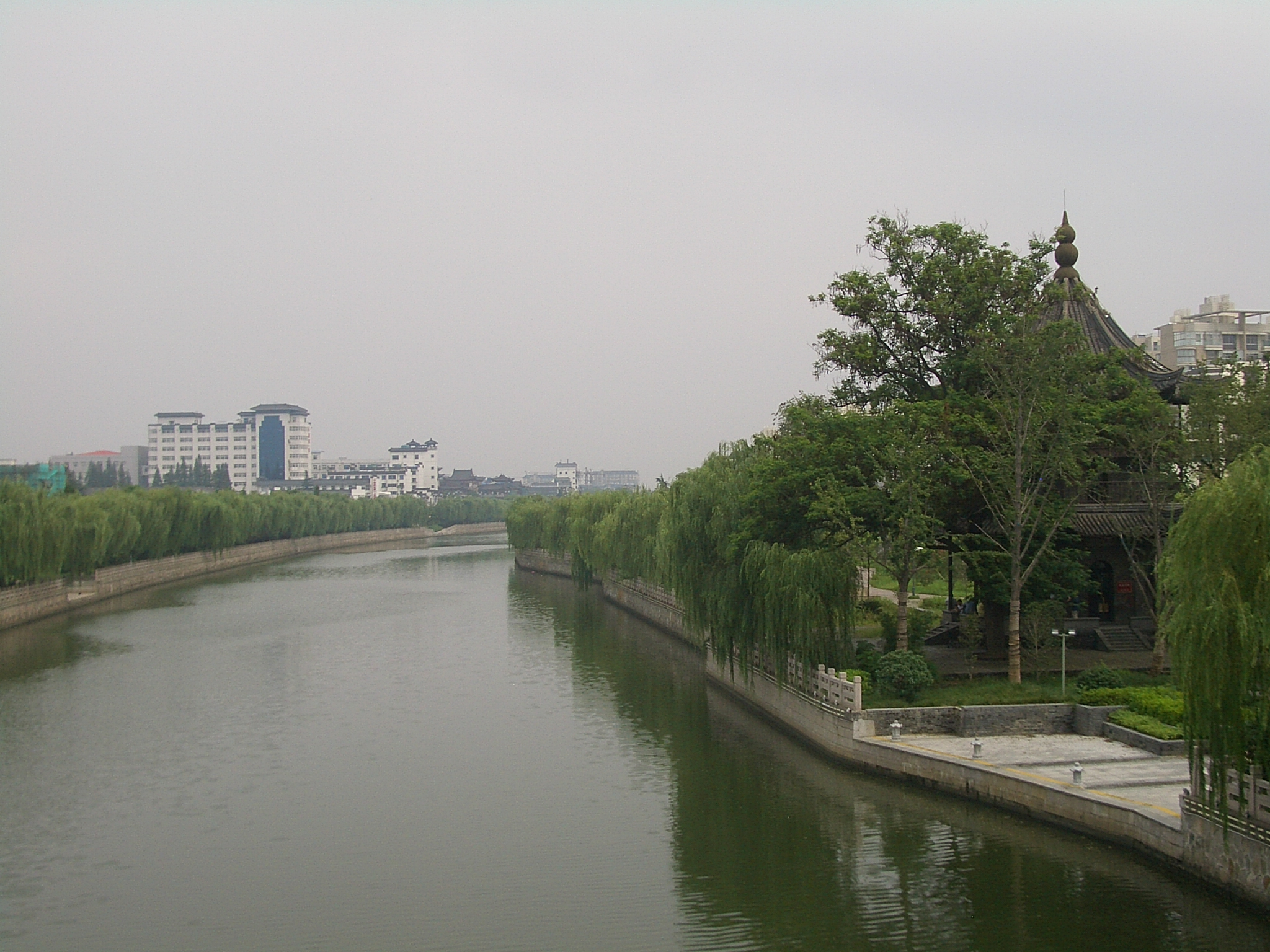
The Grand Canal in Yangzhou, located east of the city's historic center

In the centuries before the Yongle Emperor's reign, the Grand Canal had fallen into disrepair and was partly unusable. (Note: During the Yuan dynasty, rice was supplied to Beijing from the south via sea routes.) Early in the Yongle Emperor's rule, rice supplies to Beijing and the northern armies relied on two routes. One ran from Liujiagang in the Yangtze Delta through the East China Sea to Tianjin, but this sea route was dangerous because of storms and piracy. The other passed through inland rivers and canals in Anhui, Shandong, and Hubei, but required multiple transfers of cargo. Annually, 480,000 to 800,000 dan of rice were shipped by sea, while inland routes carried even more, with a total of 2 to 2.5 million dan delivered to the north between 1410 and 1414. This inefficient system placed a heavy burden on the population. The Emperor approved a petition from officials in Shandong for the restoration of a continuous north–south waterway. The government mobilized 165,000 workers to rebuild the canal and constructed 15 locks in western Shandong. After completion in 1415, transport became faster and cheaper. Rice shipments rose to 5 million dan in 1417 and 4.7 million in 1418, before later stabilizing at 2–3 million annually. 160,000 soldiers handled transport using 15,000 ships, while 47,000 workers maintained the canal. The reopening of the Grand Canal stimulated economic growth along its route, (Note: Northern Nanzhili, Henan and Shandong.) but also ended sea transport of grain to the north, contributing to a decline in naval shipbuilding. (Note: Later, officials opposed the resumption of rice transportation by sea in order to prevent the development of the naval fleet.)

The reopening of the Grand Canal had a positive impact on Suzhou. Its strategic location in the middle of the canal network south of the Yangtze (which was reconstructed after 1403) allowed the city to regain its status as a major commercial hub and experience a return to prosperity after being deprived of it during the reign of the Hongwu Emperor. Nanjing's political and economic influence declined, relegating it to a regional center, though it remained the foremost cultural center of the empire.

=== Culture ===
The Emperor portrayed himself as a patron of education and a model Confucian leader in order to solidify his legitimacy. He actively promoted traditional education, commissioned the compilation of Confucian classics, and declared Confucianism as the official state ideology. In 1414, he tasked scholars from the Hanlin Academy with creating a comprehensive collection of commentaries on the Four Books and Five Classics by Zhu Xi and other prominent Confucian thinkers of his school. This project was completed by October 1415 and became the official guide for teaching and examinations.

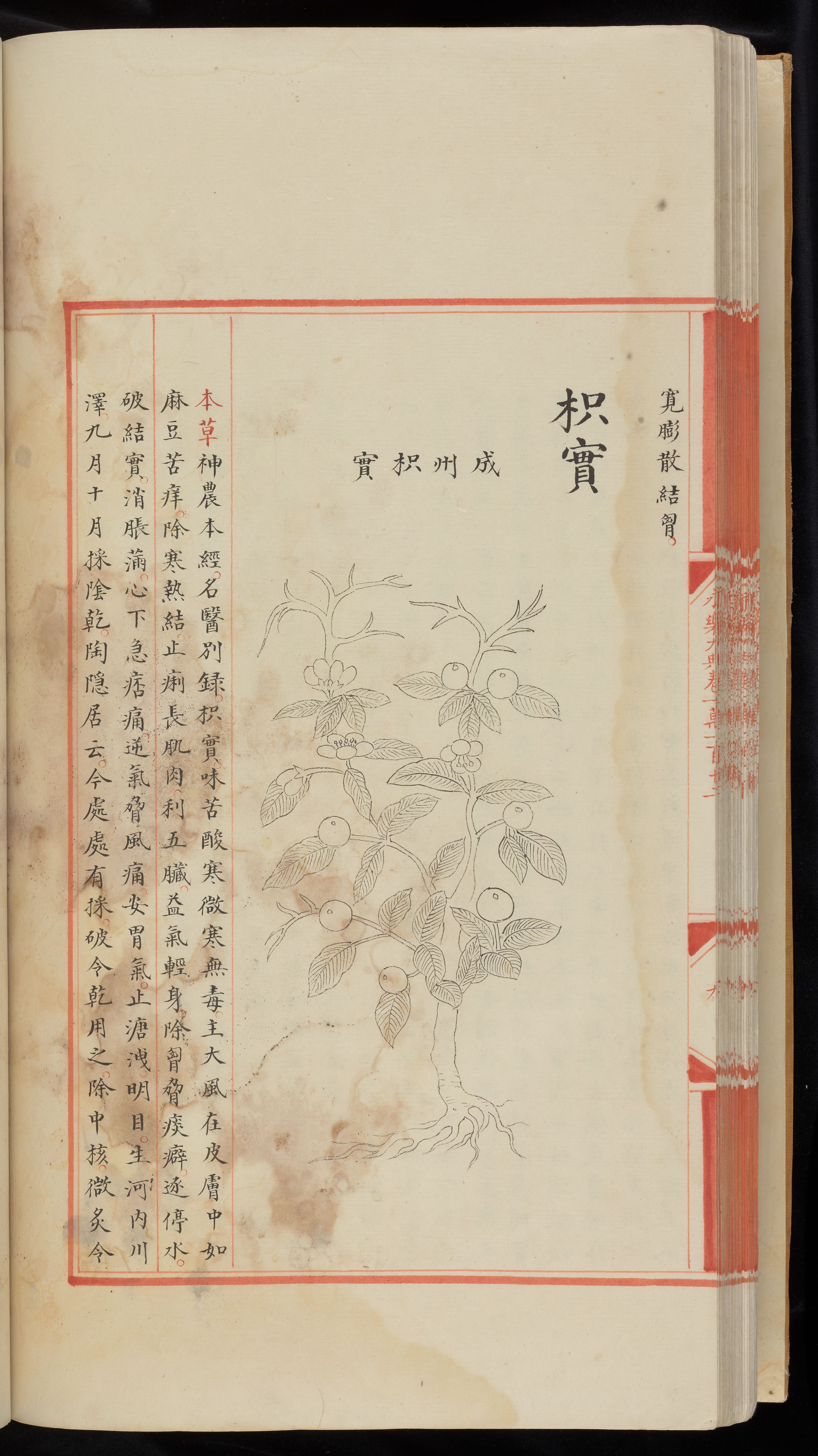
One page of a surviving volume of the Yongle Encyclopedia

The Yongle Encyclopedia was the most significant and extensive collection of encyclopedias during the Yongle era. The Emperor commissioned Grand Secretary Xie Jin to compile a collection that included all known books, either partially or completely. This project involved 2,169 scholars from the Hanlin Academy and the Imperial University and took four years to complete, finishing in December 1407. The scope of the encyclopedia was vast, consisting of 22,277 juan (chapters), with the table of contents alone spanning 60 juan, (Note: According to other sources, the Yongle Encyclopedia consisted of seven thousand volumes, 22,938 juan, and 50 million words.) but it was not published and only a few manuscripts were kept in the imperial libraries. Currently, only 700 juan have survived. This encyclopedia covered a wide range of topics and included materials from all fields of Chinese literature. Its significance lies in its contribution to the preservation of Chinese literature, as it was used by compilers in the 17th century.

The lamas from Tibet impressed the Emperor, and more than two thousand Tibetan monks resided in Beijing. He promoted the spread of Buddhism among the non-Chinese peoples of the empire, seeking to pacify conflicts and maintain peaceful rule over them. However, his reverence for Buddhism had its boundaries. He only allowed his subjects to become monks to a limited extent, following the Hongwu Emperor's decree that only one man out of 40 could do so.

== Foreign policy ==
=== Mongolian campaigns ===
The Ming government sought to integrate the Mongols into the tributary trade system, under which they exchanged horses and other livestock for paper money, silver, silk, cloth, and official titles. It also imposed strict limits on the volume of trade. When nomadic groups were unable to obtain sufficient goods through peaceful exchange, they often turned to raiding. Many Mongols also migrated into China and frequently served in the military and other imperial services.

The Mongols were divided into two main groups: the Western (Oirats) and Eastern Mongols, while the Uriankhai formed a separate group. The Ming dynasty had a strong relationship with the Uriankhai, who aided the Yongle Emperor during the civil war and earned his trust. The Emperor resettled them in the territory that had been vacated by Ming troops in 1403.

In the early years of the Yongle Emperor's reign, the Eastern Mongols remained consistently hostile, while the Ming court established relations with the weaker Oirats, whose envoys began visiting China regularly from 1408. Encouraged by the Ming, the Oirats attacked the Eastern Mongols in 1409. The Ming army also intervened but was defeated in September, resulting in the death of its commander, Qiu Fu. This defeat led the Emperor to take direct action. In March 1410, he personally led a massive army from Beijing (Note: The Yongle Emperor's army was said to have had either 300,000 or 500,000 soldiers.) and defeated Öljei Temür Khan Bunyashiri and his chancellor Arughtai after a three-month campaign. Afterward, the Ming dynasty maintained peaceful relations with the Eastern Mongols, now under Arughtai's leadership, for the following decade.

The balance of power on the steppe shifted after 1410. In 1412, the Oirat leader Mahmud killed Bunyashiri and established a puppet khan at Karakorum. As he expanded eastward against Arughtai in an apparent attempt to unite the Mongols under his rule, the Oirats emerged as a powerful new force. Their rise alarmed the Ming court and prompted the Yongle Emperor to launch a second campaign into Mongolia in 1414. The Oirat cavalry suffered heavy losses in a battle along the upper Tuul River due to the superior firepower of the Ming artillery. By August, the Emperor was content with the situation and returned to Beijing.

Renewed hostilities erupted in 1421 when the Eastern Mongols launched cross-border raids. The Emperor decided to march against them in 1422, 1423, and 1424 despite opposition from his ministers. His efforts were ultimately unsuccessful. The campaign was costly and achieved few tangible results, largely because the Mongols avoided direct confrontation with the advancing Ming armies. The Emperor died while returning from his fifth campaign in Mongolia.

The Emperor had been unable to subdue the Mongols. His campaigns into Mongolia did not result in any lasting changes and proved to be extremely costly. Although the Chinese had larger armies, more resources, and better weaponry, the nomads' mobility and the vastness of the battlefield negated these advantages. The Yongle Emperor's policy of exploiting divisions among rival Mongol leaders also proved unsuccessful. Rather than securing Ming influence, it alienated the competing factions and undermined relations between the Mongols and the Ming dynasty. His policies, particularly the withdrawal of several forward garrisons to the vicinity of the Great Wall, weakened the Ming dynasty's position in the steppe.

=== Manchuria, Korea, and Japan ===
Among the Jurchens living in Manchuria, the Ming government sought to maintain peace along the frontier and counter Korean influence. It also aimed to obtain horses and other local products, such as furs, while promoting Chinese culture and values among the Jurchens. The Yongle Emperor sent the first mission to Manchuria in 1403, offering Chinese goods and titles in exchange for the Jurchens' recognition of their subordination. From 1411 onwards, the Emperor entrusted the eunuch Yishiha with expeditions to the distant hunting tribes of northern Manchuria. Yishiha's squadron sailed down the Amur River, reaching as far as its mouth at Tyr, and declared the local Jurchens as subjects of the Ming dynasty.

By acknowledging Ming supremacy, the Koreans secured protection against northern tribes, especially the Jurchens, which brought border stability and enhanced the authority of their government through official recognition from China. The ruling Joseon dynasty only came into power in 1392. The exchange of envoys, which had been frequent under previous emperors, continued during the Yongle Emperor's reign. The Emperor's first ambassadors went to Korea in 1402 to announce his ascension. In the years that followed, there were regular contacts between the two countries, with the Koreans sending two to three delegations per year. The Koreans saw some of the Ming demands as excessive and difficult, but they fulfilled them nonetheless. These demands included providing horses and oxen for military purposes, (Note: In 1403, the king of Korea sent over 1,000 horses and 10,000 oxen. In 1404, 3,000 more horses were sent, and in 1407, before the first Mongolian campaign, another large number of horses was sent.) bronze Buddha statues, relics, paper for printing Buddhist literature, and even sending girls to serve in the imperial harem.

Relations with the Ashikaga government of Japan were at a standstill during the Hongwu era. Hu Weiyong, who was executed in 1380, was accused of conspiring with Japanese assistance. In 1399, Shōgun Yoshimitsu (r. 1369–1408) took the initiative to restore contacts in order to make profit from trade with China. This led to another mission being sent in 1403, during which the Yongle Emperor's sovereignty was recognized. In the same year, the Ming government opened maritime trade offices in Ningbo, Quanzhou, and Guangzhou, which allowed Japanese merchants with government licenses to trade. In 1411, Shōgun Yoshimochi (r. 1408–1428) implemented an isolationist policy and interrupted official relations. He also rejected the Ming's attempt to re-establish relations in 1417, although strong demand for Chinese goods and coins sustained illegal private trade through the ports of southern Japan.

=== War in Đại Việt ===
Đại Việt faced growing internal strife by the late 14th century. The kingdom, located in present-day northern Vietnam, was known to the Ming as Annam and ruled by the Trần dynasty. Lê Quý Ly overthrew the Trần dynasty in 1400 and renamed the state Đại Ngu. The Yongle Emperor recognized the new Viet government and confirmed Lê Quý Ly's son as the ruler of Đại Ngu in the winter of 1403, but relations between the two countries were strained due to escalating border disputes. Lê Quý Ly prepared for the impending conflict and continued to engage in border skirmishes. In the spring of 1406, his soldiers ambushed Ming diplomatic envoys accompanying the Trần pretender. The incident prompted the Yongle Emperor to order an invasion. The Ming army had attacked Đại Ngu from two directions by late 1406, and resistance was quelled by mid-1407. In July, the country was officially annexed to the Ming dynasty as Jiaozhi Province.

Supporters of the Trần dynasty launched a rebellion in 1408, but the Ming army defeated them the next year. Another rebellion erupted shortly after and was only fully crushed in 1414 when the Chinese captured the rebel leader, Trần Quý Khoáng. The majority of the Ming army was unable to withdraw until 1416. By the end of 1417, the Viet people launched another rebellion, led by military leader Lê Lợi. The Ming generals were unable to suppress the rebellion until the end of the Yongle Emperor's reign. (Note: The war finally came to an end in late 1427 when the Xuande Emperor made the decision to withdraw from Đại Việt. This withdrawal was carried out in the first few months of the following year. By 1431, the newly established Viet state of the Lê dynasty was recognized as a tributary state, although it remained independent in all other aspects.)

=== Treasure voyages ===
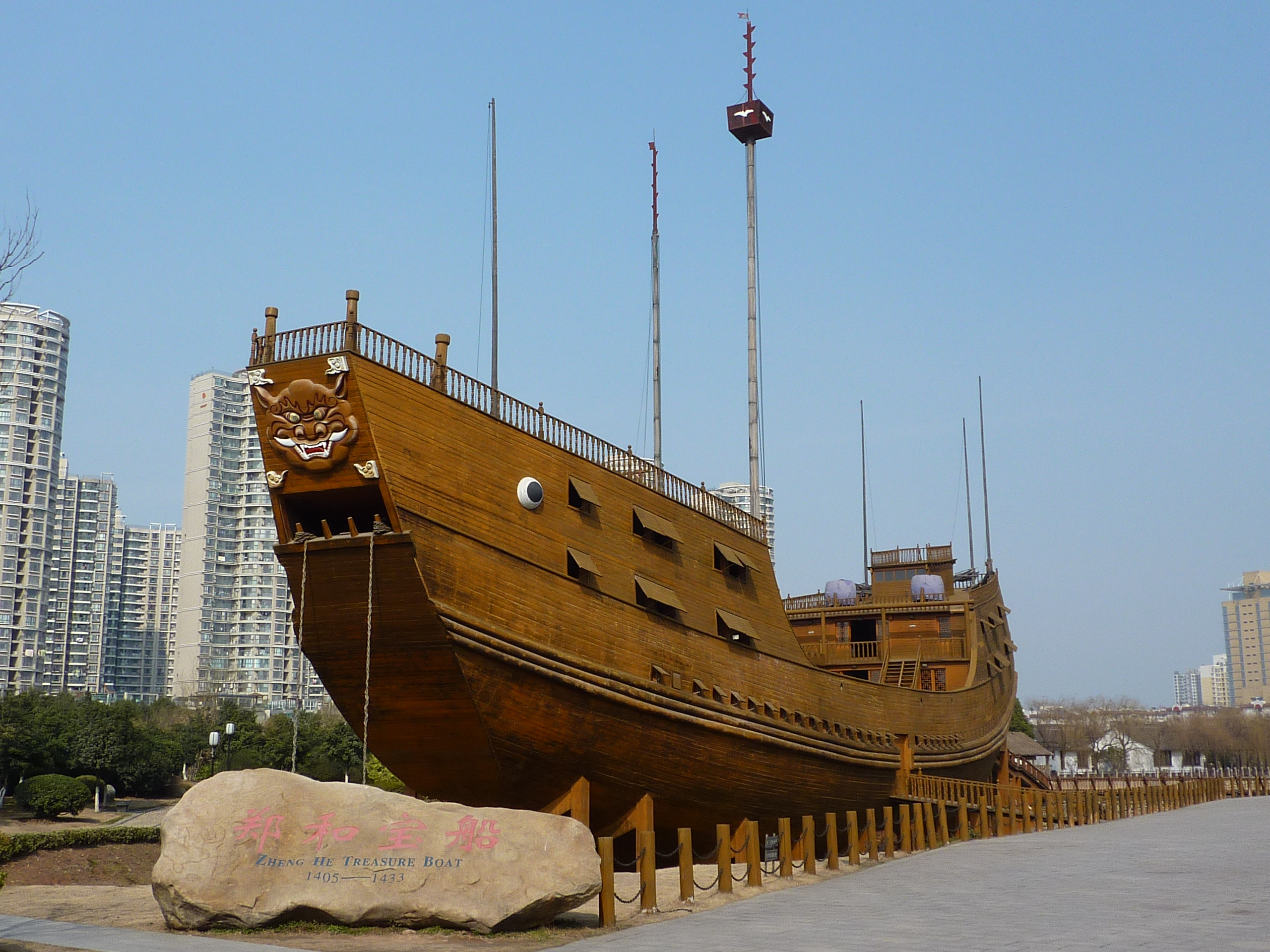
A life-size model of one of the "medium-sized" treasure ships, measuring 63.25 meters in length, is on display at the historic Nanjing Treasure Shipyard, but there is still ongoing debate about the exact size of these treasure ships.

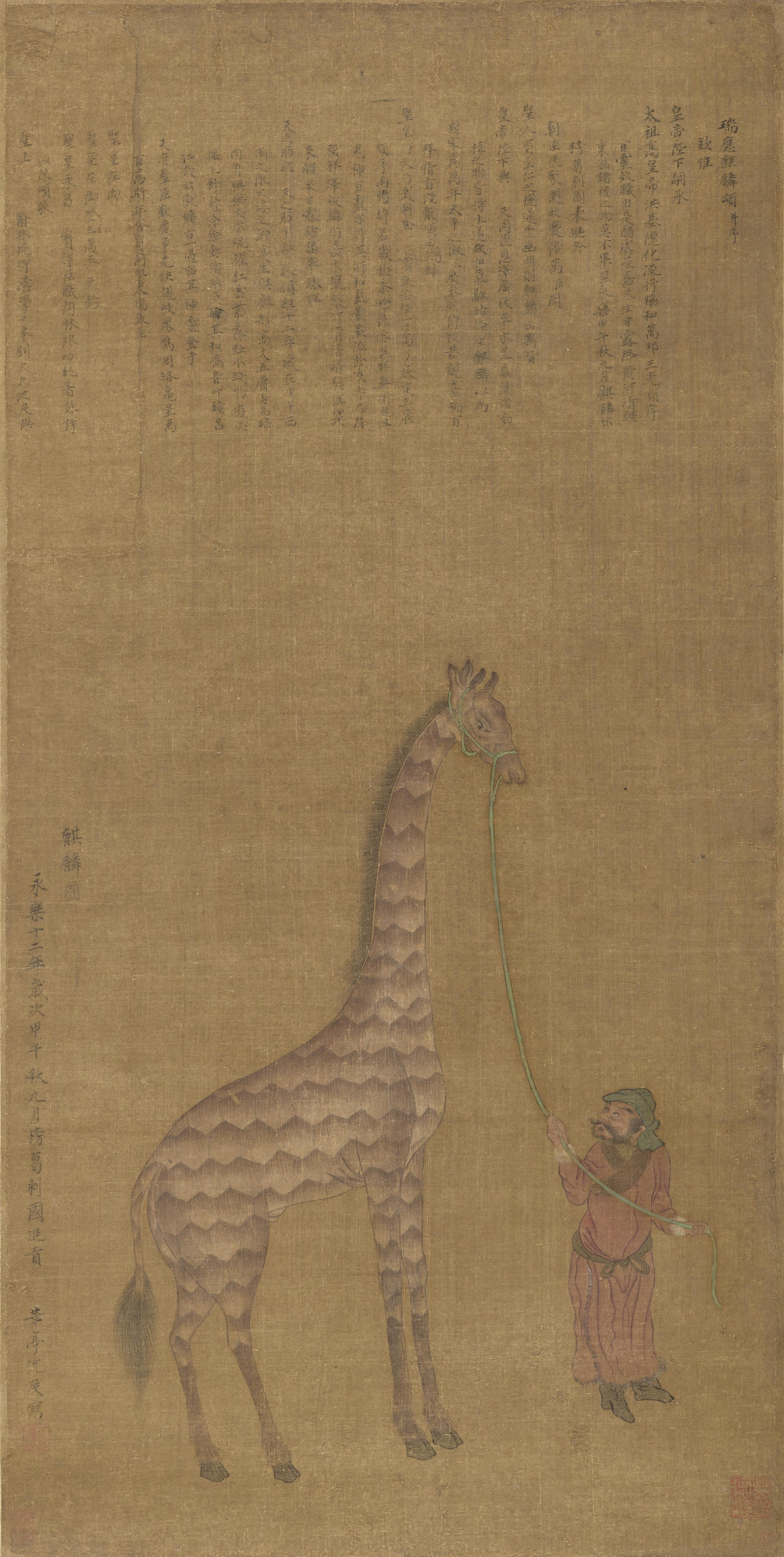
The giraffe, brought from Bengal in 1414, was depicted by Shen Du. The Chinese associated giraffes with the mythical creature Qilin.

In 1405, the Yongle Emperor appointed his favorite commander, the eunuch Zheng He, as admiral of a fleet with the purpose of expanding China's influence and collecting tribute from various nations. Two thousand ships were constructed to aid Zheng He in his seven voyages, including numerous large "treasure ships", and he embarked on six voyages to the Indian Ocean from 1405 to 1421. The first voyage took place from 1405 to 1407 and consisted of 250 or 317 ships, including 62 large "treasure ships". A total of 27,800 people were on board. The final voyage was made during the Xuande Emperor's reign from 1431 to 1433. Chinese sailors followed the main trade routes of Southeast and South Asia, sailing into the Indian Ocean. During the first three expeditions, they sailed to South India, with their main destination being Calicut, the commercial center of the region. In the following four voyages, they reached Hormuz in Persia, while separate squadrons visited various ports in the Arabian Peninsula and East Africa.

In the early years of the Yongle era, Timur's campaigns disrupted traditional trade connections with Central Asia. One of the initial goals of sending emissaries by sea to the Indian Ocean may have been to find potential allies against the Timurid Empire. This goal became less relevant when Timur died in 1405, at the beginning of the campaign to China. The Ming dynasty then established relations with his successors.

In addition to foreign policy and trade goals, Zheng's expeditions had the task of mapping the countries visited and had an educational aspect as well. The Chinese were interested in bringing back exotic animals and plants for medicinal purposes. After the deaths of Zheng He in 1433 and the Xuande Emperor in 1435, the new Confucian-led government discontinued large-scale maritime expeditions. Instead, they favored restricting foreign interaction and maritime commerce. The loss of key supporters of long-distance sailing was just one factor in the decision to abandon an active maritime policy. In the eyes of the bureaucracy, the high costs of maintaining the fleet primarily meant an undue increase in the power of eunuchs, who controlled these funds. Cutting naval expenditures also reduced the eunuchs' influence at court.

== Death and legacy ==
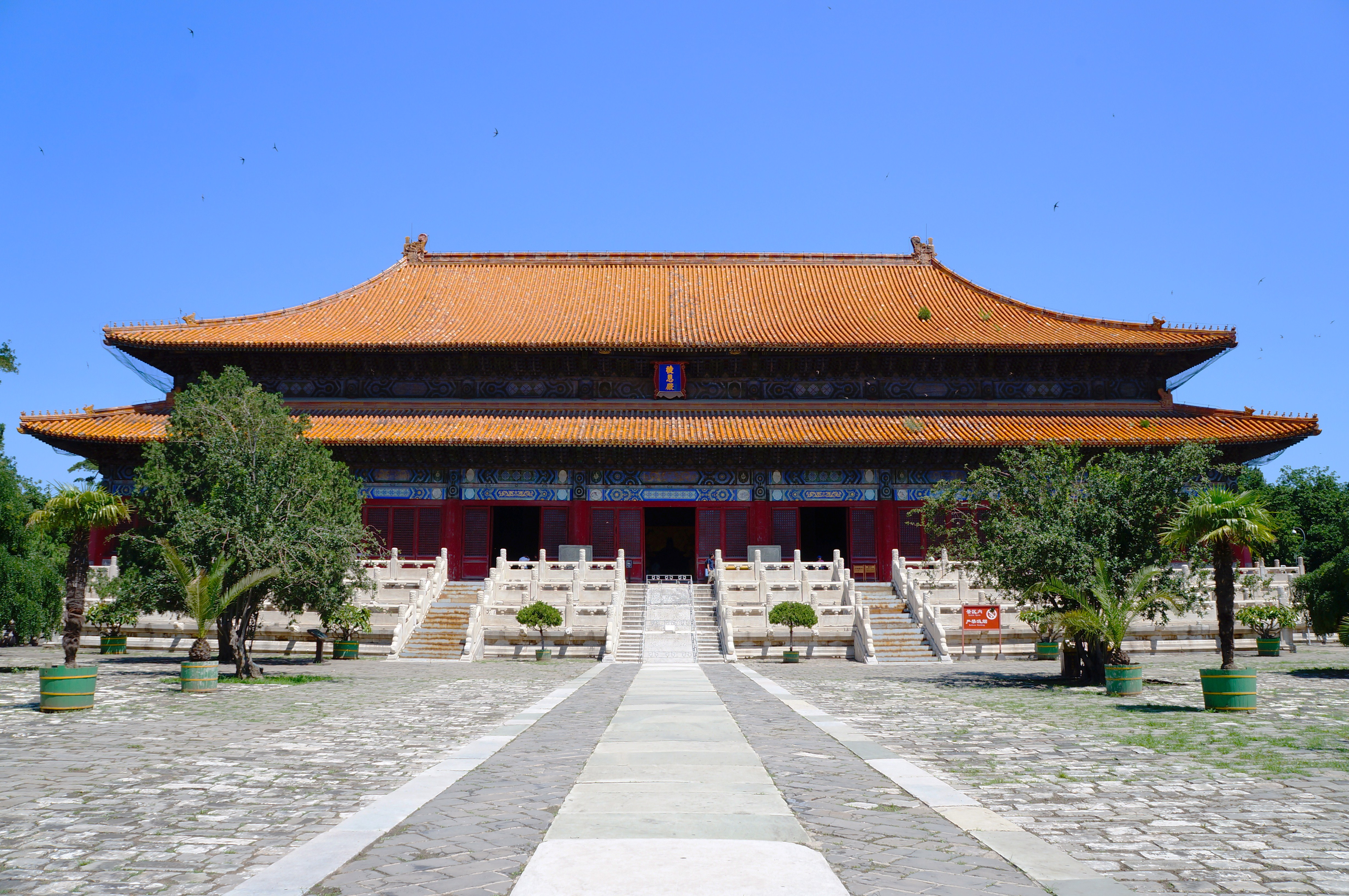
The Chang Mausoleum of the Yongle Emperor in the Ming tombs complex near Beijing. He commissioned the construction of the Chang Mausoleum as a means of legitimizing his rule and solidifying Beijing as the capital of the Ming dynasty.

On 1 April 1424, the Emperor embarked on his final campaign into Mongolia, but the campaign was unsuccessful and he fell into a deep depression. He died on 12 August 1424 in Yumuchuan, located north of Duolun. While official annals do not provide a specific cause of death, private records suggest that he suffered from multiple strokes in his final years, with the last proving to be fatal. He was buried in the Chang Mausoleum (長陵), the first of the Ming tombs located north of Beijing.

The Yongle Emperor's son Zhu Gaochi succeeded him as the Hongxi Emperor, but his reign was brief. The Hongxi Emperor died in May 1425, and his son Zhu Zhanji ascended the throne as the Xuande Emperor. The young emperor's accession was contested by his uncle Zhu Gaoxu, but the revolt was swiftly suppressed.

The Yongle Emperor received the posthumous name Emperor Wen (Cultured Emperor) and the temple name Taizong (Grand Ancestor), which was customary for second emperors of the dynasty. (Note: The Yongle Emperor did not recognize his nephew, the Jianwen Emperor, as a legitimate emperor and abolished his era name in 1402.) In 1538, the Jiajing Emperor changed the Yongle Emperor's temple name to Chengzu (Accomplished Progenitor) in order to strengthen the legitimacy of his decision to elevate his father to imperial status after his death. The use of the character cheng, which means perfection, completion, or accomplishment, shows a high level of respect for the Yongle Emperor and his accomplishments.

Chinese historians in the following centuries saw the Yongle Emperor as the ideal ruler—an energetic and capable general, a Confucian, and a restorer of traditional institutions. They credited him with unifying northern and southern China, but criticized the violence during and after his rise to power. His high spending on foreign expansion and domestic projects, particularly the relocation of the capital, was met with sharp disapproval even during his lifetime. Late Ming historians justified the negative effects of his rule as necessary for building a powerful empire. They also strongly condemned the Yongle Emperor's interventions in education, as his promotion of neo-Confucian orthodoxy led to a decline in scholarship and intellectual development.

Modern historians such as Chan Hok-lam and Wang Yuan-kang argue that the Yongle Emperor's desire for a unified China and domination over the world ultimately led to decisions that proved problematic in the long run. They argue that the withdrawal of Ming forces from the outer defensive line north of the Great Wall was a strategic mistake, making the country more vulnerable to attack. Additionally, the economic strain of the Yongle era made it difficult to support large military operations. The strict control over trade with the Mongols only worsened relations between the two. The Ming defeat in Đại Việt also weakened the empire's reputation in Southeast Asia.

== Family ==
=== Consorts and issue ===
- Empress Renxiaowen of the Xu clan (1362–1407)
  - Princess Yong'an (d. 1417), personal name Yuying, first daughter. Married in 1395 to Yuan Rong (袁容), Marquis of Guangping (廣平侯).
  - Zhu Gaochi, the Hongxi Emperor (1378–1425), first son
  - Princess Yongping (永平公主; 1379–1444), personal name Yuegui, second daughter. Married in 1395 to Li Rang (李讓), Marquis of Fuyang (富陽侯).
  - Zhu Gaoxu, Prince of Han (b. 1380), second son
  - Zhu Gaosui, Prince Jian of Zhao (1383–1431), third son
  - Princess Ancheng (安成公主; 1384–1443), third daughter. Married in 1402 to Song Hu (宋琥), son of Song Sheng, Marquis of Xining.
  - Princess Xianning (咸寧公主; 1385–1440), fourth daughter. Married in 1403 to Song Ying (宋瑛), son of Song Sheng, Marquis of Xining.
- Noble Consort Zhaoxian of the Wang clan (d. 1420)
- Noble Consort Zhaoyi (昭懿貴妃) of the Zhang clan (張氏)
- Consort Gongxianxian of the Korean Andong Gwon clan (1391–1410)
- Consort Zhongjingzhaoshunxian of the Yu clan (d. 1421)
- Consort Kangmuyigonghui (康穆懿恭惠妃) of the Wu clan (吳氏)
  - Zhu Gaoxi (朱高爔), fourth son
- Consort Gongshunrongmuli (恭順榮穆麗妃) of the Chen clan (陳氏; d. 1424)
- Consort Duanjinggonghuishu (端靜恭惠淑妃) of the Yang clan (楊氏)
- Consort Gongherongshunxian (恭和榮順賢妃) of the Wang clan (王氏)
- Consort Zhaosujinghuixian (昭肅靖惠賢妃) of the Wang clan (王氏)
- Consort Zhaohuigongyishun (昭惠恭懿順妃) of the Wang clan (王氏)
- Consort Huimuzhaojingshun (惠穆昭敬順妃) of the Qian clan (錢氏)
- Consort Kanghuizhuangshuli of the Korean Cheongju Han clan (d. 1424)
- Consort Kangjingzhuanghehui (康靖莊和惠妃) of the Korean Choi clan (崔氏; 1395–1424)
- Consort Anshunhui (安順惠妃) of the Long clan (龍氏)
- Consort Zhaoshunde (昭順德妃) of the Liu clan (劉氏)
- Consort Kangyishun (康懿順妃) of the Li clan (李氏)
- Consort Huimushun (惠穆順妃) of the Guo clan (郭氏)
- Consort Zhenjingshun (貞靜順妃) of the Zhang clan (張氏)
- Consort Shun (順妃) of the Korean Im clan (任氏; 1392–1421)
- Consort of the Korean Hwang clan (1401–1421)
- Consort of the Korean Jeong clan (1392–1421)
- Lady of Bright Deportment of the Korean Yi clan (1392–1421)
- Lady of Handsome Fairness of the Korean Ryeo clan (1393–1413)
- Beauty Gongrong (恭榮美人) of the Wang clan (王氏)
- Beauty Jinghui (景惠美人) of the Lu clan (盧氏)
- Beauty Zhuanghui (莊惠美人) of the Wang clan (王氏)
- Unknown
  - Princess Changning (常寧公主; 1386–1408), fifth daughter. Married in 1403 to Mu Xin (沐昕), son of Mu Ying, Marquis of Xiping.

=== Ancestry ===
Ancestors of Yongle Emperor

16. Zhu Sijiu
8. Zhu Chuyi
17. Lady Hou
4. Zhu Shizhen
9. Lady Wang
2. Hongwu Emperor
10. Lord Chen
5. Lady Chen
1. Yongle Emperor
6. Ma San
3. Empress Ma
7. Lady Zheng

== See also ==
- Chinese emperors family tree (late)
- Ming dynasty in Inner Asia
- Yongle Tongbao

== Notes ==
Yongle Emperor House of Zhu Born: 2 May 1360 Died: 12 August 1424
Regnal titles
Preceded by Jianwen Emperor	Emperor of the Ming dynasty 17 July 1402 – 12 August 1424	Succeeded by Hongxi Emperor
Chinese royalty
New creation	Prince of Yan; 1370–1402	Merged into the Crown
