= Hu Guang (scholar) =

Chinese official (1370–1418)

- 胡廣
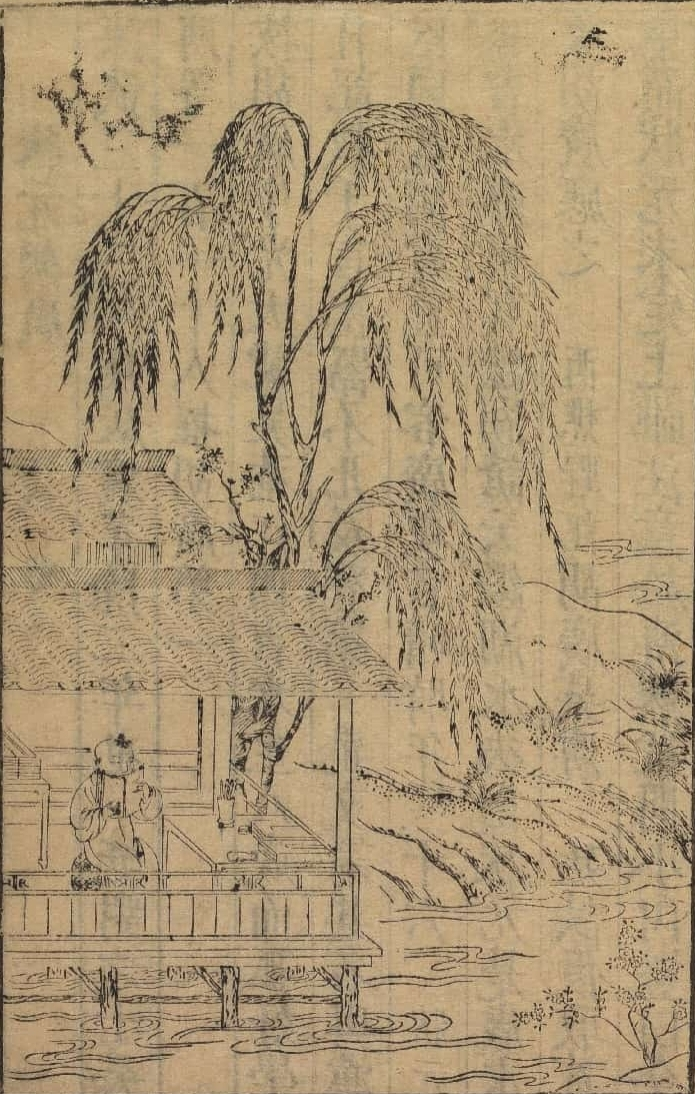
- A Ming dynasty illustration of young Hu Guang in the Ming zhuang yuan tu kao (明狀元圖考).

Senior Grand Secretary
- In office 1407–1418
- Monarch: Yongle
- Preceded by: Xie Jin
- Succeeded by: Yang Rong

Grand Secretary
- In office 1402–1418
- Monarch: Yongle

Personal details
- Born: 1370 Jishui, Jiangxi
- Died: 21 June 1418 (aged 47–48)
- Education: jinshi degree (1400)

Chinese name
- Traditional Chinese: 胡廣
- Simplified Chinese: 胡广
Transcriptions
Standard Mandarin
- Hanyu Pinyin: Hú Guǎng

Hu Guang (Note: Hu Guang used the courtesy name Guangda (光大) and the art name Huangan (晃菴). He was also known as Hu Jing (胡靖) and was given the posthumous name Wenmu (文穆).) (1370 – 21 June 1418) was a Chinese scholar-official during the Ming dynasty. He served as grand secretary during the reign of the Yongle Emperor from 1402 until his death.

== Biography ==
Hu was born during China's Ming dynasty in Jishui (present-day Jishui County, Ji'an, Jiangxi). After studying Confucianism, he successfully passed all stages of the official examinations, including the highest stage, the palace examination. In 1400, he was awarded the rank of jinshi, placing him among the top three candidates in all of China.

In September 1402, the Yongle Emperor appointed him as one of the seven personal secretaries, known as grand secretary. After the removal of Xie Jin in 1407, Hu became senior grand secretary and served in this position until his death in 1418. He was succeeded by Yang Rong.

As an aide to the Emperor, he was known for his reliability and trustworthiness, particularly in matters of personnel. His reputation was further solidified by his refusal to attack officials who had made mistakes, and he even advised the Emperor to exercise moderation in the purges of 1402. After his death, he was given an honorary posthumous name, making him one of only two civil officials to receive this honor during the Yongle Emperor's reign.
