= Consort Gwon (Ming dynasty) =

Consort Gongxianxian 恭獻賢妃
- Consort Xian (賢妃)
- Born: 22 November 1391; Hongwu 24, 26th day of the 10th month (洪武二十四年十月二十六日); Kingdom of Joseon
- Died: 20 November 1410 (aged 18); Yongle 8, 24th day of the 10th month (永樂八年十月二十四日); Lincheng
- Burial: Yi County
- Spouse: Yongle Emperor
Posthumous name
- Gongxian (恭獻); Hyeonin (Xian'ren) (현인; 顯仁)
- Clan: Andong Gwon (안동 권씨; 安東 權氏)
- Father: Gwon Jip-jung (권집중; 權執中)

Consort Gongxianxian (恭獻賢妃 權氏; 26 October 1391 – 20 November 1410), of the Andong Gwon clan, also known as Consort Hyeonin (Xian'ren) (현인비; 顯仁妃), was a consort of the Yongle Emperor. She was 31 years his junior, and originally came from Korea.

In 1408, when she was 16 years old, the emperor sent to Korea for beautiful women for his court. Upon her arrival, she demonstrated the skill in playing the jade flute. Known for her intelligence and beauty, she quickly gained favour with the emperor, and was appointed to a high position with significant responsibilities, including management of the 6 palaces where the Imperial women lived.

Due to the favour she experienced, members of her family were also honoured, as with her brother, Quan Yongjun, who was given a high position within a temple.

In 1410, while accompanying the emperor as he took an expedition against the Mongols, she suddenly died. She had lived only a year and a half as part of the Imperial Court. Though her cause of death is unknown, and no such information is recorded in annals of the time, later Korean histories suggested that she was poisoned.

In these Korean histories, her death is the beginning of a tale of widespread bloodshed, where Consort Lu accuses Consort Ryeo of poisoning Consort Gongxianxian, and, in the fallout, the Yongle emperor had nearly 3,000 people executed. No record of such large-scale scandal and mass deaths appears in Chinese histories, however, which causes many scholars to feel that the Korean history's version is probably not accurate.

She died at Lincheng, and her tomb resides in Yixian.

== Titles ==
- During the reign of the Hongwu Emperor (r. 1368–1398):
  - Lady Gwon (권씨; 權氏) (from 22 November 1391)
- During the reign of the Yongle Emperor (r. 1402–1424):
  - Consort Xian (賢妃; from February 1409)
  - Consort Gongxianxian (恭獻賢妃; from 1410)
  - Consort Hyeonin (현인비; 顯仁妃) (from 1410)
