= Zhu Gaoxu =

Chinese prince (born 1380)

Zhu Gaoxu 朱高煦
- Prince of Han
- Born: 30 December 1380
- Spouse: Lady Wei
- House: Zhu
- Father: Yongle Emperor
- Mother: Empress Xu

Chinese name
- Chinese: 朱高煦
Transcriptions
Standard Mandarin
- Hanyu Pinyin: Zhū Gāoxù

Zhu Gaoxu (born 30 December 1380) was a prince of the Ming dynasty of China. He was the second son of the Yongle Emperor and Empress Xu. During the Jingnan campaign, he played a prominent military role in his father's rise to power, and the Yongle Emperor initially considered him as a potential heir. He was ultimately passed over in favor of his elder brother Zhu Gaochi and was instead granted the title of Prince of Han. Zhu Gaoxu subsequently made repeated attempts to undermine the position of Zhu Gaochi and his supporters. In 1424, Zhu Gaochi ascended the throne as the Hongxi Emperor, but he died the next year and was succeeded by his son, the Xuande Emperor. Zhu Gaoxu launched a rebellion in an attempt to seize power from his nephew, but the Xuande Emperor quickly suppressed the revolt. Zhu Gaoxu, his wife, sons, and several of his supporters were arrested and later executed.

== Early life ==
Zhu Gaoxu was born on 30 December 1380 as the second son of Zhu Di, Prince of Yan, and his wife Lady Xu. Zhu Di was the fourth son of the Hongwu Emperor (r. 1368–1398), the founder of China's Ming dynasty. Zhu Gaoxu had an elder brother, Zhu Gaochi, and two younger brothers, Zhu Gaosui and Zhu Gaoxi. The youngest brother, Zhu Gaoxi, died in infancy. Zhu Gaoxu was tall, physically strong, and athletic. In 1395, the Hongwu Emperor made Zhu Gaoxu the Prince of Gaoyang (高陽王), a cadet branch within his father's princely line. He had little interest in academic studies and spent his days riding horses, practicing archery, and engaging in leisure activities.

The Hongwu Emperor died in 1398 and was succeeded by his grandson, the Jianwen Emperor. The new emperor implemented the policy of "reducing the feudatories" (削藩; xuefan) to curtail the authority of his princely uncles. The policy led to Zhu Di's rebellion in the autumn of 1399. The ensuing civil war, known as the Jingnan campaign, ended in 1402 with Zhu Di's victory, after which he ascended the throne as the Yongle Emperor.

During the war, Zhu Gaoxu rescued his father from dangerous situations and helped turn impending defeats into victories. In May 1400, Zhu Di was in a difficult position during the Battle of Baigou River, but Zhu Gaoxu arrived with several thousand cavalry and reinforced the Yan forces. On 1 and 2 January 1401, the Yan army was defeated at the Battle of Dongchang. Zhu Di broke through the encirclement but was pursued by imperial forces and suffered heavy casualties. Zhu Gaoxu later brought reinforcements, repelled the pursuing troops, and secured Zhu Di's retreat. The following year, the Yan army reached the northern bank of the Yangtze River and prepared to cross at Puzikou (northwest of present-day Nanjing, Jiangsu). The crossing was resisted by the imperial army, and the Yan forces initially failed. Zhu Di considered negotiating a peace settlement and withdrawing northward. Zhu Gaoxu later reinforced the Yan army with Mongol cavalry and participated in an assault that allowed the army to resume its advance.

== Succession struggle ==
Map of the Ming dynasty during the Yongle Emperor's reign, showing Yunnan, a distant province in the southwest that Zhu Gaoxu refused to take as his fief, and Shandong, where he was later granted a new fief

After the Yongle Emperor ascended the throne, many influential officials, such as the general Qiu Fu, supported Zhu Gaoxu as the preferred candidate for heir apparent because of his military achievements. Grand Secretary Xie Jin, however, told the Emperor that the people would admire his eldest son, Zhu Gaochi, for his humanity. When the Emperor remained hesitant, Xie Jin reminded him that Zhu Gaochi's eldest son, Zhu Zhanji, the Emperor's favorite grandson, would one day succeed to the throne. The Emperor eventually designated Zhu Gaochi as heir apparent in 1404. At the same time, he made Zhu Gaoxu Prince of Han (漢王), (Note: The title Prince of Han was first granted by the Hongwu Emperor to his fourteenth son, Zhu Yang, in 1378. In 1392, however, Zhu Yang was redesignated as Prince of Su.) with control of Yunnan, a province in southwestern China, and made Zhu Gaosui Prince of Zhao, with his residence in Beijing.

Zhu Gaoxu refused to go to Yunnan, so the Emperor allowed him to remain in the capital, Nanjing. An unruly and arrogant man, he requested that the Tiance Guard (天策衛) be assigned to protect his princely residence, drawing a parallel between himself and Emperor Taizong of Tang, who had held the title of Tiance General (天策上将) before ascending the throne. He also sought to undermine Zhu Gaochi and the ministers who supported him. In 1407, the Emperor dismissed Xie Jin after Zhu Gaoxu accused him of favoring his fellow Jiangxi natives in the imperial examinations. In 1414, when the Emperor returned from his Mongolian campaign, Zhu Gaoxu urged his father to punish the heir's advisers for arriving late to the welcoming ceremony, which led to the imprisonment of two grand secretaries, Yang Shiqi for a brief time and Huang Huai for ten years.

In 1416, the Emperor granted Zhu Gaoxu a new fief in Qingzhou Prefecture, Shandong. Zhu Gaoxu refused to leave and his father reprimanded him. His formation of an illegal private guard and the killing of an officer led to his demotion to commoner status and subsequent imprisonment. After a year, he was exiled to Le'an (present-day Huimin County), Shandong.

== Rebellion and death ==
The Yongle Emperor died in August 1424, and Zhu Gaochi ascended the throne as the Hongxi Emperor. After a reign of less than a year, he died in May 1425 and was succeeded by Zhu Zhanji, who became the Xuande Emperor. Feeling neglected and wronged, Zhu Gaoxu, like his father Zhu Di, decided to claim the throne. He believed that the young emperor would not be a serious obstacle to his plans. Zhu Gaoxu began to gather an army in preparation to march to the capital and seize the throne. Unlike his father, he was in a weaker position and underestimated the determination of the government, led by the experienced Grand Secretary Yang Rong, as well as the abilities of the young emperor. In September 1426, Zhu Gaoxu openly rebelled, but the Emperor personally led 20,000 soldiers under Xue Lu (薛祿; 1358–1430) to Le'an and defeated the rebels. Historian Gu Yingtai (1620–1690) attributed Zhu Gaoxu's failure to what he described as outward arrogance and inner cowardice, noting that he had failed to seize Jinan, the provincial capital of Shandong, instead ravaged Beizhili, and eventually became trapped in an isolated city before surrendering. He praised the Xuande Emperor's accurate assessment of the situation. Zhu Gaoxu was imprisoned, and 600 of his followers were executed, while 2,200 were exiled.

During the subsequent investigation, it was discovered that Zhu Gaosui and several other princes were involved in the rebellion. In order to maintain stability in the state, they were not punished. Zhu Gaoxu and his family were brought to Beijing, stripped of their titles, and confined at Xiaoyaocheng, a detention compound inside the Xi'an Gate of the Imperial City. They continued to receive food, clothing, and other provisions on the same terms as when Zhu Gaoxu was a prince. Although the Xuande Emperor was initially reluctant to execute his uncle, he eventually ordered the execution of Zhu Gaoxu, his wife, and their sons after Zhu Gaoxu tripped him during a visit.

== Family ==
- Primary consort of the Wei clan (韋氏); appointed as Princess Consort of Han in 1404 and was later executed alongside her husband.
  - Zhu Zhanhe (朱瞻壑; 1398 – 26 September 1421), first son; posthumously granted the title of Hereditary Prince Yizhuang (懿莊世子).
  - Zhu Zhanqi (朱瞻圻), second son; demoted to commoner status and sent to Fengyang to guard the imperial mausoleum in 1425. He was later executed together with his father.
  - Zhu Zhantan (朱瞻坦), third son; designated heir in 1424, he died before his father's downfall.
- Secondary consort of the Guo clan (郭氏); a granddaughter of Guo Ying (郭英), one of the founding generals of the Ming. (Note: The eldest granddaughter of Guo Ying became a Noble Consort of the Hongxi Emperor.)
- Unknown
  - Zhu Zhanci (朱瞻垐), fourth son; granted the title of Prince of Jiyang (濟陽王) in 1424 and was later executed along with his father.
  - Zhu Zhanyu (朱瞻域), fifth son; granted the title of Prince of Linzi (臨淄王) in 1424 and was later executed along with his father.
  - Zhu Zhanyi (朱瞻墿), sixth son; granted the title of Prince of Zichuan (淄川王) in 1424 and was later executed along with his father.
  - Zhu Zhanxing (朱瞻垶), seventh son; granted the title of Prince of Changle (昌樂王) in 1424 and was later executed along with his father.
  - Zhu Zhanping (朱瞻坪), eighth son; granted the title of Prince of Qidong (齊東王) in 1424 and was later executed along with his father.
  - Zhu Zhandao (朱瞻壔), ninth son; granted the title of Prince of Rencheng (任城王) in 1424 and was later executed along with his father.
  - Zhu Zhanchang (朱瞻㙊), tenth son; granted the title of Prince of Haifeng (海豐王) in 1424 and was later executed along with his father.
  - Zhu Zhanbang (朱瞻垹), eleventh son; granted the title of Prince of Xintai (新泰王) in 1424 and was later executed along with his father.

== Notes ==
Zhu Gaoxu House of Zhu Born: 30 December 1380 Died: 6 October 1426
Chinese royalty
New creation	Prince of Gaoyang; 1395–1404	Became Prince of Han
Vacant Title last held by Zhu Yang	Prince of Han; Second creation 1404–1426	Title abolished
