= Prince of Han (Ming dynasty) =

First-rank princely peerage used during Ming dynasty

Princedom of Han 漢王
- Creation date: 1404, fief taken in 1416
- Creation: 2nd creation
- Created by: Yongle Emperor
- Peerage: 1st-rank princely peerage for imperial son of Ming Dynasty
- First holder: Zhu Gaoxu
- Last holder: same as above
- Status: Extinct
- Extinction date: 1417
- Seat: Le'an state (樂安州) (Shandong Province)

Prince of Han (Chinese: 漢王) was a first-rank princely peerage used during Ming dynasty. The peerage was initially created by Hongwu Emperor for his 14th son, Zhu Ying, but his designation was later changed to Prince of Su. This princedom later created again by Yongle Emperor for his second son, Zhu Gaoxu. The princedom later abolished by Xuande Emperor after the Gaoxu Rebellion.

== Generation name / poem ==
As members of this princedom were descendants of the Yongle Emperor, their generation poem was:

"Gao Zhan Qi Jian You, Hou Zai Yi Chang You. Ci He Yi Bo Zhong, Jian Jing Di Xian You"
高瞻祁見祐，厚載翊常由。慈和怡伯仲，簡靖迪先猷

== Members ==
- Zhu Gaoxu, second son of Yongle Emperor. He initially was made a second-rank prince under the title of Prince of Gaoyang Comm. (高陽郡王) in 1395. After his father's enthronement, as an imperial son, he was promoted to the title of Prince of Han in 1404, and took his fief in 1416. He later was demoted and executed by Xuande Emperor in 1426.
  - Zhu Zhanhe (朱瞻壑) (1399 - 26 Sep 1421), Zhu Gaoxu's eldest son. He was designated the heir of the princedom in 1404, and was deceased in 1421, before his father. His full posthumous name was Hereditary Prince Zhuangyi of Han (漢懿莊世子)
  - Zhu Zhanqi (朱瞻圻) (1403 - 6 Oct 1426), Zhu Gaoxu's second son. He was designated the heir of the princedom in 1421 after his oldest brother's death, until 1424. He was then demoted in 1424 with his father and was executed by Xuande Emperor in 1426.
  - Zhu Zhantan (朱瞻坦) (1404-1426), Zhu Gaoxu's third son. He was designated the heir of the princedom in 1424. He was then demoted and executed with his father by Xuande Emperor in 1426.
  - Zhu Zhanci (朱瞻垐), Zhu Gaoxu's fourth son. He was made Prince of Jiyang of Comm. (濟陽郡王) in 1424. He was then demoted and executed with his father by Xuande Emperor in 1426.
  - 5th son: Zhu Zhanyu (朱瞻域), Zhu Gaoxu's fifth son. He was made Prince of Linzi Comm. (臨淄郡王) in 1424. He was then demoted and executed with his father by Xuande Emperor in 1426.
  - 6th son: Zhu Zhanyi (朱瞻墿), Zhu Gaoxu's sixth son. He was made Prince of Zichuan Comm. (淄川郡王) in 1424. He was then demoted and executed with his father by Xuande Emperor in 1426.
  - 7th son: Zhu Zhanxing (朱瞻垶), Zhu Gaoxu's seventh son. He was made Prince of Changle Comm. (昌樂郡王) in 1424. He was then demoted and executed with his father by Xuande Emperor in 1426.
  - 8th son: Zhu Zhanping (朱瞻坪), Zhu Gaoxu's eighth son. He was made Prince of Qidong Comm. (齊東郡王) in 1424. He was then demoted and executed with his father by Xuande Emperor in 1426.
  - 9th son: Zhu Zhandao (朱瞻壔), Zhu Gaoxu's ninth son. He was made Prince of Rencheng Comm. (任城郡王) in 1424. He was then demoted and executed with his father by Xuande Emperor in 1426.
  - 10th son: Zhu Zhanchang (朱瞻㙊), Zhu Gaoxu's tenth son. He was made Prince of Haifeng Comm. (海豐郡王) in 1424. He was then demoted and executed with his father by Xuande Emperor in 1426.
  - Zhu Zhanbang (朱瞻垹), Zhu Gaoxu's 11th son. He was made Prince of Xintai Comm. (新泰郡王) in 1424. He was then demoted and executed with his father by Xuande Emperor in 1426.
