= Prince of Zhao (Ming dynasty) =

Prince of Zhao (Chinese: 趙王) was a first-rank princely peerage used during the Ming dynasty. This peerage title initially was created by the Hongwu Emperor for his ninth son, who was deceased. The princedom was later created again by the Yongle Emperor and was held by Zhu Gaosui, his third son.

== Generation name / poem ==
As members of this princedom were descendants of the Yongle Emperor, the generation poem they used was:

"Gao Zhan Qi Jian You, Hou Zai Yi Chang You. Ci He Yi Bo Zhong, Jian Jing Di Xian You"
高瞻祁見祐，厚載翊常由。慈和怡伯仲，簡靖迪先猷

The mainline members used the poem until the name "Ci" (慈), which was the same generation as Chongzhen Emperor's son.

== Princedom of Zhao ==
Princedom of Zhao 趙王
- Creation date: 1404, fief taken in 1425
- Creation: 2nd creation
- Created by: Yongle Emperor
- Peerage: 1st-rank princely peerage for imperial son of Ming Dynasty
- First holder: Zhu Gaosui, Prince Jian
- Last holder: Zhu Youyan (the 10th prince)
- Status: Extinct
- Extinction date: 1647
- Seats: Zhangde (彰德府) (borders of Henan and Hebei)

- Zhu Gaosui (朱高燧; 19 Jan 1383 - 5 Oct 1431) (1st), third son of Yongle Emperor, he was made the Prince of Zhao in 1404 by his father, then took his fief in Zhangde in 1425 and died in 1431. His full posthumous name was Prince Jian of Zhao (趙簡王)
  - Zhu Zhanba (朱瞻坺; 1411 - 15 Feb 1427), Zhu Gaosui's eldest son, was made the hereditary prince in 1424 but died in 1427. His posthumous name was Hereditary Prince Daoxi of Zhao (趙悼僖世子)
  - Zhu Zhanque (朱瞻塙; 1413–1454) (2nd), Zhu Gaosui's second son, he initially was made a commandery prince, under the title Prince of Anyang Comm. (安陽郡王) in 1424. He succeeded the princedom from 1432 to 1455. His full posthumous name was Prince Hui of Zhao (趙惠王)
    - Zhu Qizi (朱祁鎡; 1430–1460) (3rd), Zhu Zhanque's eldest son, he succeeded the princedom from 1456 to 1460. His full posthumous name was Prince Dao of Zhao (趙悼王)
      - Zhu Jianzuo (朱見灂; 1453–1502) (4th), Zhu Qizi's eldest son, he succeeded the princedom from 1465 to 1502. His full posthumous name was Prince Jing of Zhao (趙靖王)
        - Zhu Youcai (朱祐棌; 1460–1518) (5th), Zhu Jianzuo's third son, he initially was made a commandery prince, under the title Prince of Qingliu Comm. (清流郡王). He succeeded the princedom from 1503 to 1518. His full posthumous name was Prince Zhuang of Zhao (趙莊王)
          - Zhu Houyu (朱厚煜; 1498–1560) (6th), Zhu Youcai's eldest son, he succeeded the princedom from 1521 and committed suicide in 1560. His full posthumous name was Prince Kang of Zhao (趙康王)
            - Zhu Zaipei (朱載培; 1510–1537), Zhu Houyu's eldest son, initially was made a commandery prince, under the title of Prince of Huojia Comm. from 1531 and died in 1537, before his father. His original posthumous name was Prince Zhaoding of Huojia (獲嘉昭定王). He then later posthumously honoured under the posthumous title "Prince Gong of Zhao" (趙恭王), after his grandson succeeded the princedom.
              - Zhu Yizi (朱翊錙; 1537–1559), Zhu Zaipei's eldest son, was designated as the hereditary prince in 1549 but died before his grandfather, he was posthumously honoured under the posthumous title "Prince An of Zhao" (趙安王) after his son succeeded the princedom.
                - Zhu Changqing (朱常清; 1555–1614) (7th), Zhu Yizi's eldest son, he succeeded the princedom from 1565 to 1614. His full posthumous name was Prince Mu of Zhao (趙穆王)
                  - Zhu Yousong (朱由松; d.1614), Zhu Changqing's eldest son, was designated hereditary prince in 1585 but died before his father.
                  - Zhu Yougui (朱由桂; 1590–1608), Zhu Changqing's seventh son, was made a commandery prince under the title Prince of Shouguang Comm. from 1599 to 1608. His original posthumous name was Prince Zhaojing of Shouguang (壽光昭敬王), he was posthumously honoured under the posthumous title "Prince Shun of Zhao" (趙順王) after his son succeeded the princedom.
                    - Zhu Ci... (朱慈𢣴) (8th), Zhu Yougui's eldest son, he was designated hereditary prince after the death of his uncle. He succeeded the princedom in 1617.
            - Zhu Zaiyuan (朱載垸), Prince of Chenggao Comm. (成皐郡王), Zhu Houyu's fourth son, he was appointed to acting general affairs of Princedom of Zhao from 1538 to 1565, after the death of his eldest brother.
              - Zhu Yizong (朱翊錝; d.1557), Zhu Zaiyuan's eldest son, was made a defender general under his father's designation from 1557 to 1577
                - Zhu Changyu (朱常㳛; 1574–1644) (9th), Zhu Yizong's eldest son, he initially succeeded the peerage of Prince of Chenggao Comm. from 1587. He succeeded the principality from 1632 and was killed by Li Zicheng in 1644. His posthumous name was Prince Ke of Zhao (趙恪王)
                  - Zhu Youyan (朱由棪; 1614–1647) (10th), he succeeded the princedom from 1646 to 1647.

Genealogy of Princedom of Zhao

Yongle Emperor
3rd son
Zhu Gaosui 朱高燧; 1383–1431; Prince Jian of Zhao 趙簡王; 1st Prince of Zhao; 1404–1425
1st son	2nd son
Zhu Zhanba 朱瞻坺; 1411–1427; Hereditary Prince Daoxi of Zhao 趙悼僖世子; 1424–1427	Zhu Zhanque 朱瞻塙; 1413–1454; Prince Hui of Zhao 趙惠王; 2nd Prince of Zhao; 1432–1455
1st son
Zhu Qizi 朱祁鎡; 1430–1460; Prince Kang of Zhao 趙康王; 3rd Prince of Zhao; 1456–1460
1st son
Zhu Jianzuo 朱見灂; 1453–1502; Prince Jing of Zhao 趙靖王; 4th Prince of Zhao; 1465–1502
3rd son
Zhu Youcai 朱祐棌; 1460–1518; Prince Zhuang of Zhao 趙莊王; 5th Prince of Zhao; 1503–1518
1st son
Zhu Houyu 朱厚煜; 1498–1560; Prince Kang of Zhao 趙康王; 6th Prince of Zhao; 1521–1560
1st son	4th son
Zhu Zaipei 朱載培; 1510–1537; Prince Zhaoding of Huojia Comm. "Prince Gong of Zhao" 趙恭王 (posthumously honoured)	Zhu Zaiyuan 朱載垸; Clan Patriach of Zhao; 1538–1565; Prince Duanmu of Chenggao Comm.
1st son	1st son
Zhu Yizi 朱翊錙; 1537–1559; Hereditary Prince of Zhao (princely grandson); 1549–1559 "Prince An of Zhao" 趙安王 (posthumously hounoured)	Zhu Yizong 朱翊錝 d.1577 Defender General of Chenggao
1st son	1st son
Zhu Changqing 朱常清; 1555–1614; Prince Mu of Zhao 趙穆王; 7th Prince of Zhao; 1565–1614	Zhu Changyu 朱常㳛; 1574–1644; Prince Ke of Zhao 趙恪王; 9th Prince of Zhao; 1632–1644
1st son	2nd son
Zhu Yousong 朱由松 d.1614 Hereditary Prince of Zhao; 1585–1614	Zhu Yougui 朱由桂; 1590–1608; Prince Zhaojing of Shouguang Comm. "Prince Shun of Zhao" 趙順王 (posthumously honoured)	Zhu Youyan 朱由棪; 1614–1647; 10th Prince of Zhao; 1646–1647
Zhu Ci... 朱慈𢣴; 8th Prince of Zhao; 1617–?

== Cadet princedoms ==
Genealogy of Cadet Branches of Princedom of Zhao

Yongle Emperor
Prince of Zhao 趙王; 1404, located in Zhangde
3rd son
Zhu Gaosui 朱高燧; 1383–1431; Prince Jian of Zhao 趙簡王; 1st Prince of Zhao; 1404–1425
2nd son
Prince of Anyang Comm. 安陽王; 1424 title merged after succeeded princedom of Zhao in 1432
Zhu Zhanque 朱瞻塙; 1413–1454; Prince Hui of Zhao 趙惠王; 2nd Prince of Zhao; 1432–1455
1st son	2nd son	3rd son	4th son	5th son	6th son	7th son
Prince of Linzhang Comm. 臨漳王; 1444	Prince of Tangyin Comm. 湯陰王; 1444	Prince of Xiangyi Comm. 襄邑王; 1444	Prince of Luochuan Comm. 雒川王; 1445	Prince of Nanle Comm. 南樂王; 1457	Prince of Pingxiang Comm. 平鄉王; 1457
Zhu Qizi 朱祁鎡; 1430–1460; Prince Kang of Zhao 趙康王; 3rd Prince of Zhao; 1456–1460	Zhu Qijun 朱祁鋆 d.1485 Prince Gong'an of Linzhang 臨漳恭安王; 1444−1485; 1st Prince of Linzhang Comm.	Zhu Qirui 朱祁𨧨 d.1485 Prince Zhuangxi of Tangyin 湯陰莊僖王; 1444−1485; 1st Prince of Tangyin Comm.	Zhu Qizhen 朱祁鋥 d.1465 Prince Gongding of Xiangyi 襄邑恭定王; 1444−1465; 1st Prince of Xiangyi Comm.	Zhu Qichang 朱祁鋹 d.1483 Prince Duanyi of Luochuan 雒川靖懿王; 1445−1483; 1st Prince of Luochuan Comm.	Zhu Qihong 朱祁鉷 d.1503 Prince Anyi of Nanle 南樂安懿王; 1457−1503; 1st Prince of Nanle Comm.	Zhu Qizong 朱祁鏓 d.1476 Prince Rongshun of Pingxiang 平鄉榮順王; 1457−1476; 1st Prince of Pingxiang Comm.
6 princes from 7 generations extinct in 1644	2 princes from 2 generations abolished in 1493	6 princes from 5 generations abolished in 1583	8 princes from 9 generations extinct in 1644	7 princes from 7 generations extinct in 1644	5 princes from 6 generations extinct in 1644
1st son	2nd son	3rd son
Prince of Ruyuan Comm. 汝源王; 1467	Prince of Kunyang Comm. 昆陽王; 1467 extinct in 1506
Zhu Jianzuo 朱見灂; 1453–1502; Prince Jing of Zhao 趙靖王; 4th Prince of Zhao; 1465–1502	Zhu Jianqi 朱見淇 d.1529 Prince Rongzhao of Ruyuan 汝源榮昭王; 1st Prince of Ruyuan Comm. 1467–1529	Zhu Jianqia 朱見洽 d.1506 Prince Wenmu of Kunyang 昆陽溫穆王; 1467–1506
2 princes from 3 generations main line extinct in 1549
3rd son	5th son
Prince of Qingliu Comm. 清流王; 1492 title merged after succeeded princedom of Zhao in 1503	Prince of Guang'an Comm. 廣安王; 1492
Zhu Youcai 朱祐棌; 1480–1518; Prince Zhuang of Zhao 趙莊王; 5th Prince of Zhao; 1503–1518	Zhu Youzhi 朱祐枳 d.1502 Prince Duanyu of Guang'an 廣安端裕王; 1st Prince of Guang'an Comm. 1492–1502
4 princes from 4 generations extinct in 1606
1st son	3rd son	4th son	6th son
Prince of Jiangning Comm. 江寧王; 1521	Prince of Guangshan Comm. 光山王; 1523	Prince of Xiushui Comm. 秀水王; 1530 extinct in 1540
Zhu Houyu 朱厚煜; 1498–1560; Prince Kang of Zhao 趙康王; 6th Prince of Zhao; 1521–1560	Zhu Houlian 朱厚煉 d.1562 Prince Gongyi of Jiangning 江寧恭懿王; 1521–1562; 1st Prince of Jiangning Comm.	Zhu Houhui 朱厚煇 d.1551 Prince Kangjing of Guangshan 光山康靖王; 1523–1551	Zhu Houjiong 朱厚炯 d.1540 Prince Xianmu of Xiushui 秀水憲穆王; 1530–1540
3 princes from 3 generations extinct in 1600	extinct in 1511 the clan headed by the cadet members of princedom of Jiangning
1st son	4th son
Prince of Huojia Comm. 獲嘉王; 1531	Prince of Chenggao Comm. 成皐王; 1540
Zhu Zaipei 朱載培; 1510–1537; Prince Zhaoding of Huojia 獲嘉昭定王; 1521–1560 "Prince Gong of Zhao" 趙恭王 (posthumously honoured in 1565)	Zhu Zaiyuan 朱載垸 d.1584 Prince Duanmu of Chenggao 成皐端穆王; 1st Prince of Chenggao Comm. 1540–1584
1st son	1st son
Zhu Yizi 朱翊錙; 1537–1559; Hereditary Prince of Zhao (princely grandson); 1549–1559 "Prince An of Zhao" 趙安王 (posthumously hounoured in 1565)	Zhu Yizong 朱翊錝 d.1577 Defender General of Chenggao
1st son	1st son
2nd Prince of Chenggao succeeded in 1587, title merged after succeeded princedom of Zhao in 1632
Zhu Changqing 朱常清; 1555–1614; Prince Mu of Zhao 趙穆王; 7th Prince of Zhao; 1565–1614	Zhu Changyu 朱常㳛; 1574–1644; Prince Ke of Zhao 趙恪王; 9th Prince of Zhao; 1632–1644
7th son
Prince of Shouguang Comm. 壽光王; 1599
Zhu Yougui 朱由桂; 1590–1608; Prince Zhaojing of Shouguang 壽光昭敬王; 1599-1608 "Prince Shun of Zhao" 趙順王 (posthumously honoured in 1617)	Zhu Youyan 朱由棪; 1614–1647; 10th Prince of Zhao; 1646–1647
Zhu Ci... 朱慈𢣴; 8th Prince of Zhao; 1617–?

=== Princedom of Linzhang Comm. ===
Prince of Linzhang Commandery (臨漳郡王) was created in 1538, for Zhu Qijun, second son of Zhu Zhanhao, the 2nd Prince of Zhao. The princedom was abolished in 1644 when the Ming dynasty became extinct.

- Zhu Zhanhao, Prince Hui of Zhao, 2nd Prince of Zhao
  - Zhu Bangjun (朱祁鋆; d.1485) (1st), second son of Zhu Zhanhao, the 2nd Prince of Zhao. He was made Prince of Linzhang in 1444 until his death in 1485. His full posthumous name was Prince Gong'an of Linzhang (臨漳恭安王)
    - Zhu Jianzhi (朱見淔; d.1516) (2nd), Zhu Bangjun's eldest son. He succeeded the princedom from 1487 until his death in 1516. His full posthumous name was Prince Ronghe of Linzhang (臨漳榮和王)
      - Zhu Youyi (朱祐杙; d.1505), Zhu Jianzhi's eldest son. He was made a defender general when his father succeeded the princedom, he died before his father and was posthumously honoured as a Prince of Linzhang with the posthumous name "Prince Daohuai of Linzhang" (臨漳悼懷王) after his eldest son succeeded the princedom
          - Zhu Houke (朱厚炣; d.1529) (3rd), Zhu Youyi's eldest son. He succeeded the princedom from 1521, after his grandfather's death until his death in 1529
            - Name unknown (died 1590) (4th), Zhu Houke's eldest son. He succeeded the princedom from 1538 until his death in 1590. His full posthumous name was Prince Zhuanghui of Linzhang (臨漳莊惠王)
              - Zhu Yishuo (朱翊鎙) (5th), Prince Zhuanghui's eldest son. He was designated chief son (heir apparent) in 1586 and succeeded the princedom in 1593
                - Zhu Changhai (朱常海) (6th), Zhu Yishuo's eldest son. He succeeded the princedom from 1622 until 1644
