= Chinese kinship =

System of family relationships in China

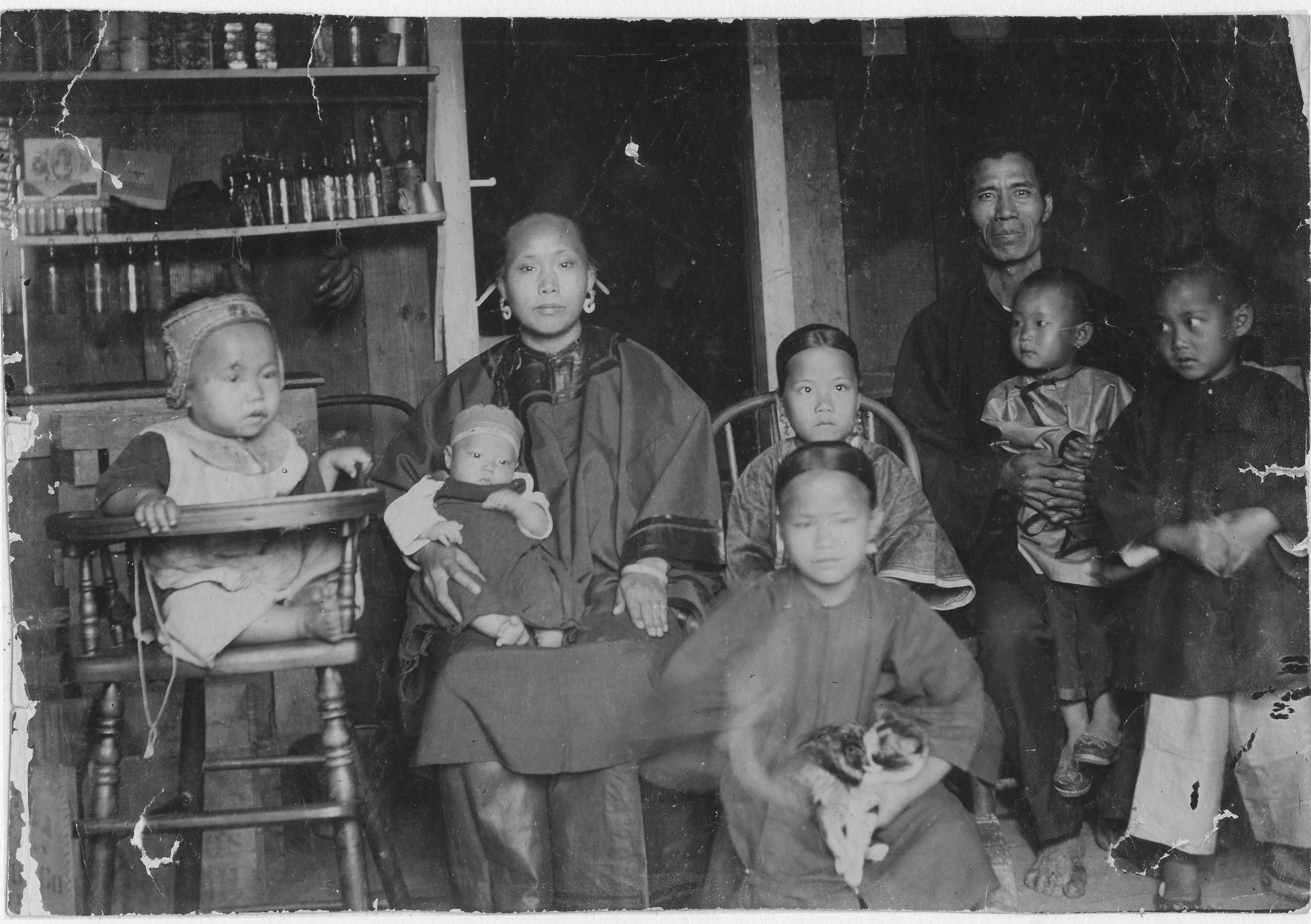
A Chinese family in Hawaii in the late 19th century.

The Chinese kinship system (simplified Chinese: 亲属系统; traditional Chinese: 親屬系統; pinyin: qīnshǔ xìtǒng) is among the most complicated of all the world's kinship systems. It maintains a specific designation for almost every member's kin based on their generation, lineage, relative age, and gender. The traditional system was agnatic, based on patriarchal power, patrilocal residence, and descent through the male line. Although there has been much change in China over the last century, especially after 1949, there has also been substantial continuity.

In the extended family, every child, from birth, participated in an organized system of kinship relations involving elder brothers, sisters, maternal elder brothers' wives, and various aunts, uncles, cousins, grandparents, and in-laws. These relationships were precisely named and differentiated. The kinship system influences every aspect of Chinese custom and morality and even law - the rights and duties they entailed were even enshrined in the legal codes of the Ming and Qing dynasties, so that gross violation could invite legal sanction.

In traditional Chinese thought, these relationships carry extensive rights and duties whose fulfilment that constituted both righteousness (yi, 義) and propriety (li, 禮). These rights and duties included love and care, certain kinds of respect on the basis of relation alone, mutual support - including financial, and mourning in the event of death. Fulfilment of these duties constituted the principal Chinese virtue - filial piety (xiao, 孝). Family members expect to be addressed by the correct term that indicated their relationship to the person communicating with them. Whenever wills clashed, it was expected, and even legally enforced, that the will of the superior family member would prevail over the will of a junior family member.

In the Chinese kinship system:

- Maternal and paternal lineages are distinguished. For example, a mother's brother and a father's brother have different terms.
- The relative age of a sibling is indicated by specific terms. For example, a father's younger brother has a different terminology than his older brother. Twins are ordered by whichever baby came out first if necessary.
- The gender of the relative is distinguished, as in English.
- The generation from ego is indicated, like in English.

Rights and duties of kinship continue even after death - it was not considered sufficient to serve one's parents well in life, but one had to display the proper protocol even after they died. Five degrees of mourning (五服) are observed. In all places and times, Chinese mourning behavior is calibrated according to the genealogical distance between the mourner and the deceased.

The 19th century anthropologist Lewis Henry Morgan, without field-work or detailed descriptions, classified Chinese kinship as a "Sudanese" or "descriptive" system.

== Kinship and Chinese societies ==
=== Literature and history ===
Kinship terms appeared in the earliest Chinese lexicon, Erya. Chapter Four Shiqin (释亲/釋親) is dedicated to an explanation of kinship and marriage. Another lexicon from the late Han dynasty, Shiming, has a detailed list of forms of address for all relatives.

With the influence of Confucianism, the concepts of kinship and consanguinity are deeply ingrained in Chinese culture. One of the Confucian teachings is filial piety, which it is extended to a series of five relationships known as the Five Cardinal Relationships (五倫), three of which are related to the family:

- ruler and subject (君臣 Pinyin: jūnchén)
- father and son (父子 fùzǐ)
- elder and younger brother (兄弟 xiōngdì)
- husband and wife (夫婦 fūfù)
- between friends (朋友 péngyǒu)

In the Three Character Classic, the nine agnates are listed in the following stanza:

| 高曾祖 父而身 身而子 子而孫 | Great-great-grandfather, great-grandfather, grandfather, father and self, self and son, son and grandson, |
| 自子孫 至玄曾 乃九族 人之倫 | from son and grandson, on to great-grandson and great-great-grandson. These are the nine agnates, constituting the kinships of man. |

=== Culture ===
In Chinese culture where the extended family is still valued, kinship terms have survived well into current usage. Also, since it is taboo to refer to or address a more senior family relation by his or her given name, the kinship term is the only possible term of address. When there are many siblings as in many Post–World War II baby-boom families, the relation is distinguished and addressed according to age or rank, going as far as ordering twins by which baby came out first if that is necessary. For example, 大 (great/senior/elder) is used in the address for 大姨 (the eldest sister of one's mother); 二姨 for the second eldest sister of one's mother; 三姨 for the third eldest sister of one's mother, etc. In cases where someone is older than his more senior relation, such as an uncle, it is common to address the senior relation with a diminutive suffix.

Because some of these terms have no equivalent in foreign languages, they are not easily translated and the descriptiveness is often lost in translation. However, terms such as "Second Uncle" are sometimes used.

Despite the complexity of the kinship address system (see terminology section below), it is common to simplify it for the sake of familiarity. Some formal kinship terms are not familiar to many people, cumbersome, or not preferred by the addressee. For example, a cousin once removed may at her discretion be referred to as simply a cousin if she is of a similar age to the speaker.

=== Law ===
The Great Qing Legal Code (大清律例) was the last set of Chinese laws where the complete kinship terms were shown. The Qing code not only confirmed the importance of defining kinship relations, but also defined the legal and moral conducts between family relations. Although there was no specific statute in the Qing code to define kinship terms, it specified the mourning attire and ritual appropriate according to the relation between the mourner and the deceased. Kinship relationships also played a crucial role in the administration of justice under the Qing. Penalties were more severe for crimes committed against senior relatives within the family hierarchy. Crimes committed against those outside of the extended family were punished less harshly. Crimes committed by senior family members against their inferiors were least likely to elicit harsh sentences.

Among the 47 statutes added in 1740 under Qianlong Emperor, Statute 2 (Charts/Tables of Mourning Attire, (喪服諸圖)) and Statute 3 (Code of Attire, (服制)) dealt with mourning attire completed with charts. According to Qing law, one had to observe a period of mourning when a relative died. The closer and more senior the deceased family member, the longer the period of mourning is dictated by law. The mourning period range from three months to three years. During this period, the bereaved had to stay at home, excuse himself from public service, refrain from celebrations of all sorts, and practice abstinence, among other things.

The "extermination of nine kindreds" (誅九族) is considered one of the most severe punishments found in traditional Chinese law enforced until the end of Qing. The practice of exterminating the kins had been established since Qin when Emperor Qin Shi Huang (reigned 247 BC–221 BC) declared "Those who criticize the present with that of the past, Zu" (以古非今者族). Zu (族) referred to the "extermination of three kindreds" (三族): father, son and grandson. The extermination was to ensure the elimination of challenges to the throne and political enemies. Emperor Wen of Sui (reigned 581–604) abolished the practice but it was reintroduced by the succeeding Emperor Yang (reigned 604–617). Not only did he bring back the punishment, but he also extended it to the nine kindreds.

In the first year of the reign of the Yongle Emperor (Ming dynasty, reigned 1402–1424), the prominent historian Fāng Xìao-rú (方孝孺) committed an offense worthy of the "extermination of nine kindreds" for refusing to write the inaugural address and for insulting the Emperor. He was recorded as saying in defiance to the would-be Emperor: "莫說九族，十族何妨！" ("Never mind nine agnates, go ahead with ten!"). Thus he was granted his wish with an infamous case, perhaps the only one, of "extermination of ten kindreds" (誅十族) in the history of China. In addition to the blood relations from his nine-agnates family hierarchy, his students and peers were added to be the tenth group. Altogether 873 people were said to have been executed.

To this day, a three-character term (冚家鏟) for "death to the entire family" remains a powerful profanity in the Cantonese language.

=== Clan ===
A Chinese clan is a patrilineal and patrilocal group of related Chinese people with a common surname sharing a common ancestor. In southern China, clan members could form a village known as an ancestral village. In Hong Kong, clan settlement is exemplified by walled villages . An ancestral village usually features a hall and shrine honoring ancestral clan members. A clan pedigree can be found recording male members of the clan. A married woman is considered part of her husband's clan.

Not all kinship in China is patrilineal: the Mosuo of Yunnan and Sichuan, officially classified within the Naxi nationality, practice matrilineal descent and a visiting sexual relationship rather than patrilocal marriage.

=== Marriage and divorce ===
Marriage is an important rite signifying the coming together of two clans and the beginning of a new family unit. Marriage has to be permanent and issue is expected. Weddings were central occasions in a family's life. Spouses were chosen carefully by the parents. Marital agreements, especially among the well-to-do, were stipulated with contracts between both families. This practice was continued for centuries and spread throughout the world, and goes on to this day. Divorce was nearly impossible. The choices made between the families held great importance, and weddings were held on certain days to ensure good fortune. This practice gained prominence during the Han dynasty (202BCE-220CE).

=== Polygamy ===
Polygamy (specifically polygyny) had been practiced in Chinese societies for thousands of years. Since the Han dynasty, Chinese men have been able to legally have only one wife. It was common for privileged Chinese men to have a wife and various concubines, however. For those who could afford a bride price and support a family of multiple concubines and children, polygyny provided a better chance of issuing heirs. The importance of this was apparent in the imperial court, which usually housed hundreds of concubines. Aside from concubinage, having multiple wives with equal status was also accepted prior to the ban on polygamy.

In a concubinage situation, the wife, concubines and their children would live in the same household. Wives and concubines would often refer to each other as "sisters". As a concubine was not wedded in a marriage ceremony, she had fewer rights in the household. There was also no inter-clan relation between the man's clan and the concubine's own kin.

Polygamy was banned in China in 1930 when the Republic of China government promulgated Civil Code (Part IV) where Section 985 states "A person who has a spouse may not contract another marriage. A person shall not marry with two or more persons simultaneously." This is still in effect today in the territories under effective administration of the Republic of China including Taiwan and Kinmen and Matsu. However, as infringement of marriage cannot be prosecuted without a complaint by the wife, one can still unofficially practice polygamy by registering only one marriage. Such practice still happen occasionally among older and wealthy men. After the establishment of the People's Republic of China by the Chinese Communists on the mainland, this banning was reaffirmed in the passage of the Marriage Code of 1950. In Hong Kong, new polygamous marriages were no longer legally allowed after 1971 with the passage of the Marriage Reform Ordinance (Cap. 178). Due to this, incidents of extramarital affairs rose. Some men have even established a family with their mistresses and children kept secret from their wives. There is a phenomenon of cross-border polygyny usually involving Hong Kong men and their mistresses living in mainland China.

== Demographics ==
With modern Chinese governments advocating smaller families through family planning campaigns and policy-making, large extended families may be a thing of the past. The People's Republic of China introduced its One-child policy in 1979, and The Family Planning Association of Hong Kong began its "Two is enough!" (兩個就夠哂數!) campaign in the 1970s . Contrasted with the large extended families created during the pre-war and baby-boom years, average modern Chinese families now have many fewer children.

As of 2006, the fertility rates in Hong Kong and Macau ranked among the lowest two in the world. Hong Kong, ranked the lowest in the world, was the only territory with less than one child born per woman on the average. Both Mainland China and Taiwan were ranked well below the world average. Similarly, the birth rates in Hong Kong and Macau ranked among the lowest three in the world. Both Mainland China and Taiwan were ranked below the median.

A product of rising divorce rates in Chinese societies is the breakdown of the traditionally close-knit kinship relation. On the other hand, remarriage could provide more than two sets of paternal or maternal relatives.

== Defining kin ==
=== Nine grades of relations ===
The "nine grades of relations" (九族) is an important concept when it comes to application of laws and observing rituals. Since the Han dynasty, there have been two separate interpretations of what is defined by the nine grades. Each interpretation is based on societal and political needs as the ruler of the day see fit.

The "older" interpretation ("古文說") defined the nine grades of relations strictly in the paternal line. That is, nine generations from great-great-grandfather down to great-great-grandchildren. This interpretation was officially recognized after Tang and Song dynasties. By Ming and Qing dynasties, laws have defined the patrilineality of the nine kindreds. This interpretation was cited in Part III Chapter 2 of Lewis Henry Morgan's 1877 book Ancient Societies.

The "contemporary" interpretation ("今文說") defines the nine grades of relations to be four generations from the paternal line, three from the maternal line, and two from the wife's. Historically, this definition has been used during award, punishment and family annihilation.

Yet another interpretation suggests that "nine" is actually an arbitrary number as nine is considered a large number in Chinese culture. As such, it means anyone and everyone related is to be executed in the context of family annihilation.

=== Five degrees of mourning attire ===
The five degrees of mourning attire (五服) define not only the proper attire, but also the proper mourning ritual one should observe when a relative has died. Appearing in writings as early as the Rites of Zhou, mourning rituals developed over the years. By the time of the Qing dynasty, it was set down in law that there were five degrees, or grades of mourning according to the relationship one has with the deceased. The closer a person is related to the deceased, the higher the degree of mourning that is observed. A married female belongs to her husband's clan and observes a similar but lower degree of mourning than her husband. She would observe mourning for a small portion of the members from her own clan. A married man would observe mourning for an even smaller number of relatives of his in-laws.

In a concubinage situation, a concubine was only required to mourn for her husband, his wife, his parents, and all his children including her own, whereas a wife was required to mourn for almost all of her husband's near relatives. In addition, there was no requirement to mourn the death of a concubine except by the man's children.

Since the end of feudal China, the rituals of the five degrees of mourning have largely given way to simpler and less elaborate observance.

Conventionally, clans adopted the five degrees of mourning according to unwritten definitions that determines the difference between close and distant relatives. As such, marriage between relatives that were covered within the five degrees of mourning was considered taboo and immoral. These definitions, unlike the mourning ritual, are still applicable in determining whether a marriage is acceptable, albeit fewer people are familiar with the mourning rituals themselves.

According to these definitions, many relatives considered "distant" in Western cultures are considered close in Chinese culture.

The five degrees of mourning attire in decreasing order of severity are:

1. 斬榱 - 3 years (actually 25 months)
2. 齊榱 - 3 years, 1 year, 1 year with staff of mourning, 5 months, 3 months
3. 大功 - 9 months, 7 months
4. 小功 - 5 months
5. 緦麻 - 3 months

== Common extended family and terminology ==
This section covers members and their spouses in the immediate and extended family that is commonly found in the first nine corner cells on the table of consanguinity or cousin chart (from ego to grandparents on the rows and columns). The terms are listed in Standard Chinese, regional and dialectal usages are listed in the corresponding row. The degrees of mourning attire are included as an indication of how close the relation is to ego and what level of respect is expected. "1" being the highest; "5" being the lowest. "0" means they are not within the definition of the five degrees of mourning. Some of these are common relations and are included for completeness. The degrees of mourning indicated in the table are based on ego as an unmarried member of the family.

=== General prefixes ===
- 堂 (táng) - "inner kins": used in relation to father's clan
- 外 (wài) / 表 (biǎo) - "outer kins": prefix to indicate maternal lineage on some of the relations, descendants of female members of "inner kins".
- 高 (gāo) - prefix for relations four generations removed senior of ego, i.e.: great-great-grandparents (高祖父母)
- 曾 (zēng) - prefix for relations three generations removed, i.e.: great-grandparents; great-grandchildren (曾祖父母; 曾孫)
- 祖 (zǔ) - prefix for relations two generations removed senior of ego, i.e.: grandparents (祖父母), also a general prefix for relations two or more generations senior of ego.
- 孫 (SC: 孙) (sūn) - prefix for relations two generations removed junior of ego, i.e.: grandchildren (孫), also a general prefix for relations two or more generations junior of ego.
- 玄/元 (xuán/yuán) - prefix for relations four generations removed junior of ego, i.e.: great-great-grandchildren (玄孫/元孫)

Where they differ, the Simplified Chinese character is presented first, followed by the Traditional Chinese character in parentheses.

=== Members of the nuclear family ===
As with all languages, there exist a high degree of regional variation in kinship terminology. Different Chinese languages, dialects, and even families can have distinct words and pronunciations for the same person. In the tables below, the "other variants" presented happens to be mostly from Cantonese, and should not be interpreted as being comprehensive. Also, a person may use terminology from a region but pronounce the term with the regional pronunciation, a different regional pronunciation, or in Putonghua, which may be the case when a person has family members from different parts of China.

Primary members
| Relation | Formal term | Vocative or Address | | English equivalent | Degree of mourning duration |
| Relation | Formal term | Standard Mandarin | Other variants | English equivalent | Degree of mourning duration |
|---|---|---|---|---|---|
| father | 父, 父亲 (父親) fù, fùqīn | 爸爸 bàba | 老豆 lou5 dau6 阿爸 aa3 baa4 | father | 1 (3 years) |
| mother | 母, 母亲 (母親) mǔ, mǔqīn | 妈妈 (媽媽) māma | 阿媽 aa3 maa1 媽咪 maa1 mi4 老母 lou5 mou2 | mother | 1 (3 years) |
| elder brother | 兄 xiōng | 哥哥 gēge | 大佬 daai6 lou2 阿兄 | brother | 2 (1 year) |
| younger brother | 弟 dì | 弟弟 dìdi | 細佬 sai3 lou2 | brother | 2 (1 year) |
| elder sister | 姊 zǐ | 姊姊 zǐzi 姐姐 jiějie | 家姐 gaa1 ze1 | sister | 4; 5 if married |
| younger sister | 妹 mèi | 妹妹 mèimei | 阿妹 aa3 mui1 | sister | 4; 5 if married |
| wife | 妻子 qīzi | 老婆 lǎopó 太太 tàitai | 牽手khan tshiú 娘子 | wife | 2* (1 year); 2 (1 year) if in-law parents are not deceased |
| husband | 丈夫, 先生 zhàngfu, xiānsheng | 老公 lǎogōng | 老公 lou5 gung1 翁 頭家 thâu ge | husband | 1 (3 years) |
| son | 儿子 (兒子) érzi | 儿子 (兒子) érzi | 仔 zai2 | son | 2 (1 year) |
| daughter | 女儿 (女兒) nǚ'ér | 女儿 (女兒) nǚ'ér 闺女 (閨女) guī nǚ | 女女 neoi4 neoi2 | daughter | 2 (1 year) |

=== Members of the extended family ===
Paternal lineage
| Relation | Formal term | Vocative or Address | | English equivalent | Degree of mourning (duration) |
| Relation | Formal term | Standard Mandarin | Other variants | English equivalent | Degree of mourning (duration) |
|---|---|---|---|---|---|
| father's father | 祖父 zǔfù | 爷爷 (爺爺) yéye | 阿公 agong | (paternal) grandfather | 2 |
| father's mother | 祖母 zǔmǔ | 奶奶 nǎinai | 阿嬤 amā 嫲嫲 mama | (paternal) grandmother | 2 |
| father's older brother | 伯父 bófù | 伯伯 bóbo | | uncle | 2 (1 year) |
| father's older brother's wife | 伯母 bómǔ | 伯母 bómǔ | 伯娘 bóniáng | aunt | 2 (1 year) |
| father's younger brother | 叔父 shūfù | 叔叔 shūshu | | uncle | 2 (1 year) |
| father's younger brother's wife | 婶母 (嬸母) shěnmǔ | 婶婶 (嬸嬸) shěnshen | | aunt | 2 (1 year) |
| father's older sister | 姑母 gūmǔ | 姑妈(姑媽) gūmā 姑姑 gūgu | 阿姑 āgū | aunt | 2 (1 year); 3 -if married |
| father's older sister's husband | 姑父 gūfu | 姑夫 gūfu | 姑丈 gūzhàng | uncle | 0 |
| father's younger sister | 姑姐 gūjiě | 姑姑 gūgu | 阿姑 āgū 姑姐 gūjiě | aunt | 2 (1 year); 3 -if married |
| father's younger sister's husband | 姑父 gūfu | 姑夫 gūfu | 姑丈 gūzhàng | uncle | 0 |
| father's brother's son, older than ego | 堂兄 tángxiōng 堂哥 tánggē | | | first cousin | 3 |
| father's brother's son, younger than ego | 堂弟 tángdì | | | first cousin | 3 |
| father's brother's son's wife | 堂嫂 tángsǎo | | | first cousin-in-law | 5 |
| father's brother's daughter, older than ego | 堂姊 tángzǐ | 堂姊tángzǐ 堂姐 tángjiě | | first cousin | 3; 4 -if married |
| father's brother's daughter, younger than ego | 堂妹 tángmèi | | | first cousin | 3; 4 -if married |
| father's sister's son, older than ego | 表兄 biǎoxiōng | 姑表兄 gūbiǎoxiōng 表哥 biǎogē | | first cousin | 5 |
| father's sister's son, younger than ego | 表弟 biǎodì | 姑表弟 gūbiǎodì | | first cousin | 5 |
| father's sister's son's wife | 表嫂 biǎosǎo | 姑表嫂 gūbiǎosǎo | | first cousin-in-law | 5 |
| father's sister's daughter, older than ego | 表姊 biǎozǐ | 姑表姊 gūbiǎozǐ 表姐 biǎojiě | | first cousin | 0 |
| father's sister daughter, younger than ego | 表妹 biǎomèi | 姑表妹 gūbiǎomèi | | first cousin | 0 |

Maternal lineage
| Relation | Formal Term | Vocative or Address | | English equivalent | Degree of mourning (duration) |
| Relation | Formal Term | Standard Mandarin | Other variants | English equivalent | Degree of mourning (duration) |
|---|---|---|---|---|---|
| mother's father | 外祖父 wàizǔfù | 外公 wàigōng | 公公 gōnggong 阿公 āgōng 姥爷 lǎoye | (maternal) grandfather | 4 |
| mother's mother | 外祖母 wàizǔmǔ | 外婆 wàipó | 婆婆 pópó 阿嬤 āmā 姥姥 lǎolao | (maternal) grandmother | 4 |
| mother's brother | 舅父 jiùfù | 舅舅 jiùjiu | | uncle | 4 |
| mother's brother's wife | 舅母 jiùmǔ | 舅妈 (舅媽) jiùmā | 妗母 jìnmǔ | aunt | 0 |
| mother's sister | 姨母 yímǔ | 姨妈 (姨媽) yímā (older than ego's mother); 阿姨 āyí (younger than ego's mother) | | aunt | 4 |
| mother's sister's husband | 姨父 yífù | 姨夫 yífu | 姨丈 yízhàng | uncle | 0 |
| mother's sibling's son, older than ego | 表兄 biǎoxiōng | 表哥 biǎogē | | first cousin | 5 |
| mother's sibling's son, younger than ego | 表弟 biǎodì | 表弟 biǎodì | | first cousin | 5 |
| mother's sibling's daughter, older than ego | 表姊 biǎozǐ | 表姐 biǎojiě | | first cousin | 0 |
| mother's sibling's daughter, younger than ego | 表妹 biǎomèi | 表妹 biǎomèi | | first cousin | 0 |

Nephews and nieces
| Relation | Formal Term | Vocative or Address | English equivalent | Degree of mourning (duration) |
|---|---|---|---|---|
| brother's son | 姪儿 (姪兒) zhíér | 姪仔 zhízí | nephew | 2 (1 year) |
| brother's son's wife | 姪媳妇 (姪媳婦) zhíxífù | | niece-in-law | 3 |
| brother's daughter | 姪女 zhínǚ | | niece | 2 (1 year); 3 -if married |
| brother's daughter's husband | 姪女婿 zhínǚxù | | nephew-in-law | 0 |
| sister's son | 外甥 wàishēng | 姨甥 (if ego is female) yíshēng | nephew | 0 |
| sister's daughter | 外甥女 wàishēngnǚ | 姨甥女 (if ego is female) yíshēngnǚ | niece | 0 |

Grandchildren
| Relation | Term | Vocative or Address | English equivalent | Degree of mourning (duration) |
|---|---|---|---|---|
| son's son | 孙儿 (孫兒) sūnér | 孙仔 (孫仔) sūnzí | grandson | 2 (1 year) -heir-apparent 3 -all others |
| son's daughter | 孙女 (孫女) sūnnǚ | | granddaughter | 2 (1 year) |
| daughter's son | 外孙儿 (外孫兒) wàisūnér | 外孙仔 (外孫仔) wàisūnzí | grandson | 5 |
| daughter's daughter | 外孙女 (外孫女) wàisūnnǚ | | granddaughter | 0 |

In-laws
| Relation | Term | Vocative or Address | English equivalent | Degree of mourning (duration) |
|---|---|---|---|---|
| older brother's wife | 嫂 sǎo | 嫂子 sǎozi | sister-in-law | 4 |
| younger brother's wife | 弟妇 (弟婦) dìfù | | sister-in-law | 4 |
| older sister's husband | 姊夫 zǐfū | 姐夫 jiěfū | brother-in-law | 0 |
| younger sister's husband | 妹夫 mèifū | | brother-in-law | 0 |
| son's wife | 儿媳 (兒媳) érxí | 媳妇 (媳婦) xífù | daughter-in-law | 2 (1 year) -wife of heir-apparent 3 -all others) |
| daughter's husband | 女婿 nǚxù | | son-in-law | 0 |
| son's son's wife | 孙媳妇 (孫媳婦) sūnxífù | | granddaughter-in-law | 2 (1 year) -wife of heir-apparent 5 -all others |
| son's daughter's husband | 孙女婿 (孫女婿) sūnnǚxù | | grandson-in-law | 0 |
| daughter's son's wife | 外孙媳妇 (外孫媳婦) wàisūnxífù | | granddaughter-in-law | 0 |
| daughter's daughter's husband | 外孙女婿 (外孫女婿) wàisūnnǚxù | | grandson-in-law | 0 |
| wife's father | 岳父 yuèfù | 岳丈 yuèzhàng; 外父 wàifù | father-in-law | 5 |
| wife's mother | 岳母 yuèmǔ | 丈母 zhàngmǔ; 外母 wàimǔ | mother-in-law | 5 |
| husband's father | 公公 gōnggōng | 家公 jiāgōng; 老爷 (老爺) lǎoyé | father-in-law | 1 (3 years) |
| husband's mother | 婆婆 pópó | 家姑 jiāgū; 家婆jiāpó; 奶奶 nǎinǎi | mother-in-law | 1 (3 years) |
| wife's older brother | 内兄 (內兄) nèixiōng | 大舅 dàjiù | brother-in-law | 0 |
| wife's younger brother | 内弟 (內弟) nèidì | 小舅 xiǎojiù | brother-in-law | 0 |
| wife's older sister | 姨姐 yíjiě | 大姨 dàyí | sister-in-law | 0 |
| wife's younger sister | 姨妹 yímèi | 小姨 xiǎoyí | sister-in-law | 0 |
| husband's older brother | 大伯 dàbó | | brother-in-law | 3 |
| husband's older brother's wife | 大嫂 dàsǎo | | sister-in-law | 4 |
| husband's younger brother | 小叔 xiǎoshū | | brother-in-law | 4 |
| husband's younger brother's wife | 小婶 (小嬸) xiǎoshěn | | sister-in-law | 4 |
| husband's older sister | 大姑 dàgū | | sister-in-law | 4 |
| husband's younger sister | 小姑 xiǎogū | | sister-in-law | 4 |
| wife's sister's husband, older than ego | 襟兄 jīnxiōng | | (elder) (co-)brother-in-law | 0 |
| wife's sister's husband, younger than ego | 襟弟 jīndì | | (younger) (co-)brother-in-law | 0 |
| husband's brother's wife | 妯娌 zhóulǐ | | (co-)sister-in-law | |
| son's or daughter's father-in-law | 亲家公 (親家公) qìngjiāgōng | 亲家翁 (親家翁) qìngjiāwēng | co-father-in-law (rare) | |
| son's or daughter's mother-in-law | 亲家母 (親家母) qìngjiāmǔ | 亲家婆 (親家婆) qìngjiāpó | co-mother-in-law (rare) | |
| husband's wife, senior to ego | ?媵 | | co-wife | |
| husband's wife, junior to ego | ?媵 | | co-wife | |
| husband's wife, younger sister to ego | 娣媵 dìyìng | | sister-wife | |
| concubine | 妾 qiè | | concubine | |

== Larger extended family and terminology ==
This section covers members and their spouses found beyond the first nine corner cells on the table of consanguinity or cousin chart. Although some of the relations seem distant, they are considered close relatives and it is common for Chinese families to have regular contact with these members.

Extended family
| Relation | Term | Vocative or Address | English equivalent | Degree of mourning (duration) |
|---|---|---|---|---|
| paternal (maternal) grandfather's older (younger) brother | (外)伯(叔)祖父 (wài) bó (shū) zǔfù | (外)伯(叔)公 (wài) bó (shū) gōng | granduncle | paternal: 4 maternal: 0 |
| wife | (外)伯(婶)祖母 ((外)伯(嬸)祖母) (wài) bó (shěn) zǔmǔ | 外伯(婶)祖母 ((外)伯(嬸)婆) (wài) bó (shěn) pó | grandaunt | paternal: 4 maternal: 0 |
| paternal (maternal) grandfather's sister | (外)姑祖母 (wài) gūzǔmǔ | (外)姑婆 (wài) gūpó; (外) 从祖姑 ((外)從祖姑) (wài) cóngzǔgū | grandaunt | paternal: 4; 5 if married maternal: 0 |
| husband | (外)姑祖父 (wài) gūzǔfù | (外)姑公 (wài) gūgōng; (外)丈公 (wài) zhànggōng | granduncle | 0 |
| paternal (maternal) grandmother's brother | (外)舅祖父 (wài) jiùzǔfù | (外)舅公 (wài) jiùgōng | granduncle | 0 |
| wife | (外)舅祖母 (wài) jiùzǔmǔ | (外)舅婆 (wài) jiùpó | grandaunt | 0 |
| paternal (maternal) grandmother's sister | (外)姨祖母 (wài) yízǔmǔ | (外)姨婆 (wài) yípó | grandaunt | 0 |
| husband | (外)姨祖父 (wài) yízǔfù | (外)姨公 (wài) yígōng | granduncle | 0 |
| paternal (maternal) great-grandparent | (外)曾祖父母 (wài) zēngzǔfùmǔ | (外)太公/婆 (wài) tàigōng/pó | great-grandparent | paternal: 2 (5 months) maternal: 0 |
| paternal (maternal) great-grandfather's older (younger) brother | (外)族曾祖父 (wài) zúzēngzǔfù | (外)曾伯(叔)祖父 (wài) zēngbó (shū) zǔfù; (外)太伯(叔)公 (wài) tàibó (shū) gōng | great-granduncle | paternal: 5 maternal: 0 |
| wife | (外)族曾祖母 (wài) zúzēngzǔmǔ | (外)太伯(婶)婆 ((外)太伯(嬸)婆) (wài) tàibó (shěn) pó; (外)太伯(婶)婆 ((外)太伯(嬸)婆) (wài) tàibó (shěn) pó | great-grandaunt | paternal: 5 maternal: 0 |
| paternal (maternal) great-grandfather's sister | (外)族曾祖姑 (wài) zúzēngzǔgū | (外)曾祖姑 (wài) zēngzǔgū | great-grandaunt | paternal: 5; 0 if married maternal: 0 |
| paternal (maternal) great-great-grandparent | (外)高祖父母 (wài) gāozǔfùmǔ | | great-great-grandparent | paternal: 2 (3 months) maternal: 0 |
| paternal (maternal) great-great- great-grandparent | (外)天祖父母 (wài) tiānzǔfùmǔ | | great-great- great-grandparent | paternal: 2 (3 months) maternal: 0 |
| paternal (maternal) great-great-great- great-grandparent | (外)烈祖父母 (wài) lièzǔfùmǔ | | great-great-great- great-grandparent | ? |
| paternal (maternal) great-great-great- great-great-grandparent | (外)太祖父母 (wài) tàizǔfùmǔ | | great-great-great- great-great-grandparent | ? |
| paternal (maternal) great-great-great-great- great-great-grandparent | (外)远祖父母 (wài) yuǎnzǔfùmǔ | | great-great-great-great- great-great-grandparent | ? |
| paternal (maternal) great-great-great-great- great-great-great-grandparent | (外)鼻祖父母 (wài) bízǔfùmǔ | | great-great-great-great- great-great-great-grandparent | ? |
| son of brother's son (daughter) | (外)姪孙儿 ((外)姪孫兒) (wài) zhísūnér | | grandnephew | 2 (1 year) maternal: 0 |
| wife | (外)姪孙媳 ((外)姪孫媳) (wài) zhísūnxí | | grandniece in-law | 5 maternal:0 |
| daughter of brother's son (daughter) | (外)姪孙女 ((外)姪孫女) (wài) zhísūnnǚ | | grandniece | 2 (1 year); 3 if married maternal: 0 |
| sister's grandchildren | 外甥孙儿女 (外甥孫兒女) wàishēngsūnérnǚ | | grandnephew; grandniece | 0 |
| children of son's son | 曾孙儿女 (曾孫兒女) zēngsūnérnǚ | | great-grandchildren | male: 5; female:0 |
| children of son's daughter | 曾外孙儿女 (曾外孫兒女) zēngwàisūnérnǚ | | great-grandchildren | 0 |
| children of daughter's son | 外曾孙儿女 (外曾孫兒女) wàizēngsūnérnǚ | | great-grandchildren | 0 |
| children of daughter's daughter | 重外孙儿女 (重外孫兒女) chóngwàisūnérnǚ | | great-grandchildren | 0 |
| children of son's son's son | 玄孙儿女 (玄孫兒女) xuánsūnérnǚ | 元孙儿女 (元孫兒女) yuánsūnérnǚ | great-great-grandchildren | male: 5; female:0 |
| all other grandchildren | 外玄孙儿女 (外玄孫兒女) wàixuánsūnérnǚ | 外元孫兒女 (外元孙儿女) wàiyuánsūnérnǚ | great-great-grandchildren | |
| grandson of brother's son (daughter) | (外)姪曾孙儿 ((外)姪曾孫兒) (wài) zhízēngsūnér | | great-grandnephew | 5; maternal: 0 |
| granddaughter of brother's son (daughter) | (外)姪曾孙女 ((外)姪曾孫女) (wài) zhízēngsūnnǚ | | great-grandniece | 5; maternal: 0 |
| sister's great-grandchildren | 外甥曾孙儿女 (外甥曾孫兒女) wàishēngzēngsūnérnǚ | | great-grandnephew; great-grandniece | 0 |

First cousins
| Relation | Term | English equivalent | Degree of mourning (duration) |
|---|---|---|---|
| children of father's brother's son | 堂姪儿女 (堂姪兒女) tángzhíérnǚ | first cousin once removed | |
| all other grandchildren of father's sibling | 表姪儿女 (表姪兒女) biǎozhíérnǚ | " | |
| grandchildren of mother's sibling | 表甥儿女 (表甥兒女) biǎoshēngérnǚ | " | |
| son of paternal grandfather's brother who is older than ego's father | 堂伯 tángbó | " | |
| son of paternal grandfather's brother who is younger than ego's father | 堂叔 tángshū | " | |
| daughter of paternal grandfather's brother | 堂姑 tánggū | " | |
| son of maternal grandfather's brother | 堂舅 tángjiù | " | |
| daughter of maternal grandfather's brother | 堂姨 tángyí | " | |
| son of paternal grandfather's sister who is older than ego's father | 表伯 biǎobó | " | |
| son of paternal grandmother's sibling who is older than ego's father | 表伯 biǎobó | " | |
| son of paternal grandfather's sister who is younger than ego's father | 表叔 biǎoshū | " | |
| son of paternal grandmother's sibling who is younger than ego's father | 表叔 biǎoshū | " | |
| daughter of paternal grandfather's sister | 表姑 biǎogū | " | |
| daughter of paternal grandmother's sibling | 表姑 biǎogū | " | |
| son of maternal grandfather's sister | 表舅 biǎojiù | " | |
| son of maternal grandmother's sibling | 表舅 biǎojiù | " | |
| daughter of maternal grandfather's sister | 表姨 biǎoyí | " | |
| daughter of maternal grandmother's sibling | 表姨 biǎoyí | " | |
| son of paternal (maternal) great-grandfather's brother who is older than ego's grandfather | (外)族伯祖父 (wài) zúbózǔfù | first cousin twice removed | |
| son of paternal (maternal) great-grandfather's brother who is younger than ego's grandfather | (外)族叔祖父 (wài) zúshūzǔfù | " | |
| daughter of paternal great-grandfather's brother | (外)族祖姑 (wài) zúzǔgū | " | |
| children of father's brother's son's son | 堂姪孙儿女 (堂姪孫兒女) tángzhísūnérnǚ | | |
| all other great-grandchildren of parent's sibling | 表姪孙儿女 (表姪孫兒女) biǎozhísūnérnǚ | " | |

Second cousins
| Relation | Term | Vocative or Address | English equivalent | Degree of mourning (duration) |
|---|---|---|---|---|
| paternal grandson of paternal grandfather's brother older than ego | 再从兄 (再從兄) zàicóngxiōng | | second cousin | 4 |
| paternal grandson of paternal grandfather's brother younger than ego | 再从弟 (再從弟) zàicóngdì | | " | 4 |
| paternal granddaughter of paternal grandfather's brother older than ego | 再从姐 (再從姐) zàicóngjiě | | " | 4; 5 if married |
| paternal granddaughter of paternal grandfather's brother younger than ego | 再从妹 (再從妹) zàicóngmèi | | " | 4; 5 if married |
| maternal grandson of paternal grandfather's brother older than ego | 隔代表兄 gédàibiǎoxiōng | | " | |
| maternal grandson of paternal grandfather's brother younger than ego | 隔代表弟 gédàibiǎodì | | " | |
| maternal granddaughter of paternal grandfather's brother older than ego | 隔代表姐 gédàibiǎojiě | | " | |
| maternal granddaughter of paternal grandfather's sister older than ego | 隔代表妹 gédàibiǎomèi | | " | |
| paternal great-grandson of paternal grandfather's brother | 堂侄 tángzhí | | second cousin once removed | |
| paternal great-granddaughter of paternal grandfather's brother | 堂侄女 tángzhínǚ | | " | |

Third cousins
| Relation | Term | Vocative or Address | English equivalent | Degree of mourning (duration) |
|---|---|---|---|---|
| great-grandson of paternal great-grandfather's brother older than ego | 族兄 zúxiōng | 三从兄 (三從兄) sāncóngxiōng | third cousin | 5 |
| great-grandson of paternal great-grandfather's brother younger than ego | 族弟 zúdì | 三从弟 (三從弟) sāncóngdì | " | 5 |
| great-granddaughter of paternal great-grandfather's brother older than ego | 族姐 zújiě | 三从姐 (三從姐) sāncóngjiě | " | 5; 0 if married |
| great-granddaughter of paternal great-grandfather's brother younger than ego | 族妹 zúmèi | 三从妹 (三從妹) sāncóngmèi | " | 5; 0 if married |

== Distant relations ==
Other than some of the relations mentioned in the previous sections that are not covered under the five degrees of mourning attire, the following are kin that are also considered distant.

- (外)來孫 - great-great-great-grandchildren
- (外)晜孫 - great-great-great-great-grandchildren
- (外)仍孫 - great-great-great-great-great-grandchildren
- (外)雲孫 - great-great-great-great-great-great-grandchildren
- (外)耳孫 - great-great-great-great-great-great-great-grandchildren

外 - prefix for maternal line relations; essentially anyone not sharing the same surname as ego

== Partial or no consanguinity ==
The following familial relationship suggests partial or no consanguinity. Most of them are not a modern phenomenon, however. In fact, polygamy (specifically polygyny) was widely accepted in pre-republican China.

The saying of "three fathers and eight mothers" (三父八母 ; Sān fù bā mǔ) refers to:

- Cohabiting stepfather (同居的繼父 ; Tóngjū de jìfù)
- Non-cohabiting stepfather (不同居的繼父 ; Bù tóngjū de jìfù)
- Stepfather from remarriage of father and mother (從父母嫁之繼父 ; Cóng fùmǔ jià zhī jìfù)
- 嫡母 (Dímǔ) - father's official wife (when birth mother of ego is a concubine)
- 繼母 (Jìmǔ) - stepmother
- 養母 (Yǎngmǔ) - adopted mother
- 慈母 (Címǔ) - concubine replacing ego's birth mother who died
- 嫁母 (Jiàmǔ) - widowed birth mother who has remarried
- 出母 (Chūmǔ) - birth mother who has been divorced
- 庶母 (Shùmǔ) - father's concubine who is also a mother (when birth mother of ego is the official wife)
- 乳母 (Rǔmǔ) - wet nurse

Another saying of "five fathers and ten mothers" (五父十母 ; Wǔ fù shí mǔ) refers to

- 生父 (Shēngfù) - birth father
- 養父 (Yǎngfù) - adopted father
- 繼父 (Jìfù) - stepfather
- 義父 (Yìfù) - godfather
- 師父 (Shīfù) - (male) teacher/coach/master

and two mothers added to the eight mentioned above:

- 生母 (Shēngmǔ) - birth mother
- 諸母 (Zhūmǔ) - father's concubine

As a result of polygamy there would be half-siblings:

- 同父異母兄弟姐妹 (Tóng fù yìmǔ xiōngdì jiěmèi) - siblings sharing the same father
- 同母異父兄弟姐妹 (Tóng mǔ yìfù xiōngdì jiěmèi) - siblings sharing the same mother

== See also ==
- Chinese marriage
- Chinese surname
- Chinese compound surname
- Chinese given name
- Little Emperor Syndrome

General:

- Family
- Consanguinity
- Patrilineality

== References and further reading ==
- Jankowiak, William; Sun, Yuezhu (8 June 2017). "Family Relationships in Contemporary China". Oxford Bibliographies.
- Morgan, Lewis Henry. 1877. Ancient Society. MacMillan & Company, London (complete text online)
- Watson, James L (1982). "Chinese Kinship Reconsidered: Anthropological Perspectives on Historical Research". The China Quarterly. 92: 589–622. doi:10.1017/S0305741000000965.
- Wolf, Arthur P. and Chieh-shan Huang. 1985. Marriage and Adoption in China, 1845-1945. Stanford University Press.
- (in Chinese) Code of (Mourning) Attire tables
- "Sympathy and Severity". extremeorient.revues.org.
