= Damnatio memoriae =

Exclusion of a person from official records and accounts

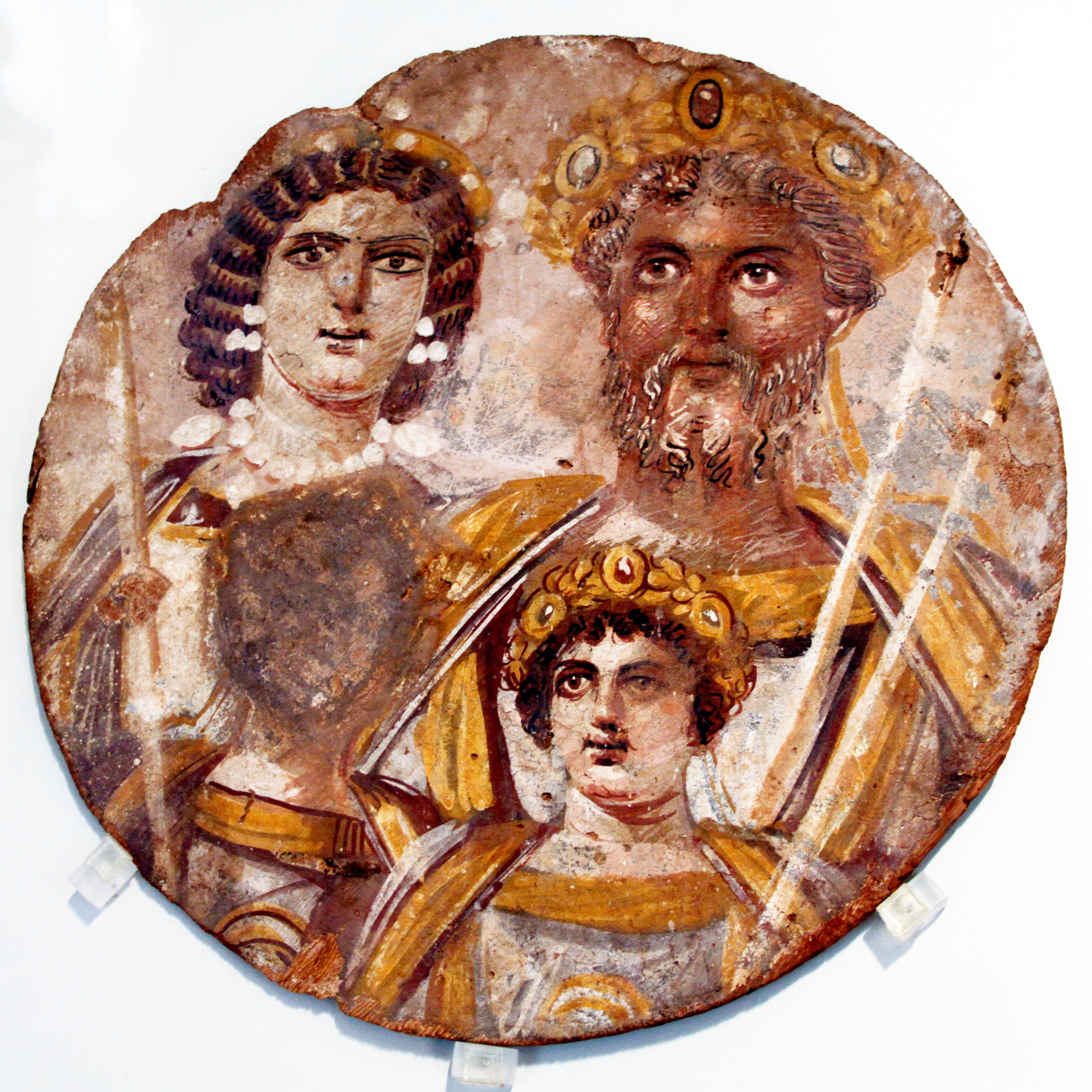
The Severan Tondo, c. 199 AD tondo of the Severan family, with portraits of Septimius Severus, Julia Domna, and their sons Caracalla and Geta. The face of one of Severus' and Julia's sons has been erased; it may be Geta's, as a result of the damnatio memoriae ordered by his brother Caracalla after Geta's death.

Damnatio memoriae (Classical Latin pronunciation: [damˈnaːti.oː mɛˈmɔri.ae̯]) is a modern Latin phrase meaning "condemnation of memory" or "damnation of memory", indicating that a person is to be excluded from official accounts, or remembered after death in a way contrary to what that person may have desired. There are and have been many routes to damnatio memoriae including the destruction of depictions, the removal of names from inscriptions and documents, and even large-scale rewritings of history.

== Etymology ==
Although the term damnatio memoriae is Latin, the phrase was not used by the ancient Romans, and first appeared in a thesis written in Germany in 1689 by Christoph Schreiter and Johann Heinrich Gerlach. The thesis was titled Dissertationem juridicam de damnatione memoriae, praescitu superiorum, in florentissima Philurea (lit. "A Legal Dissertation on the Condemnation of Memory, Foreknown by Superiors, in the Most Flourishing Philurea").

== Ancient world ==
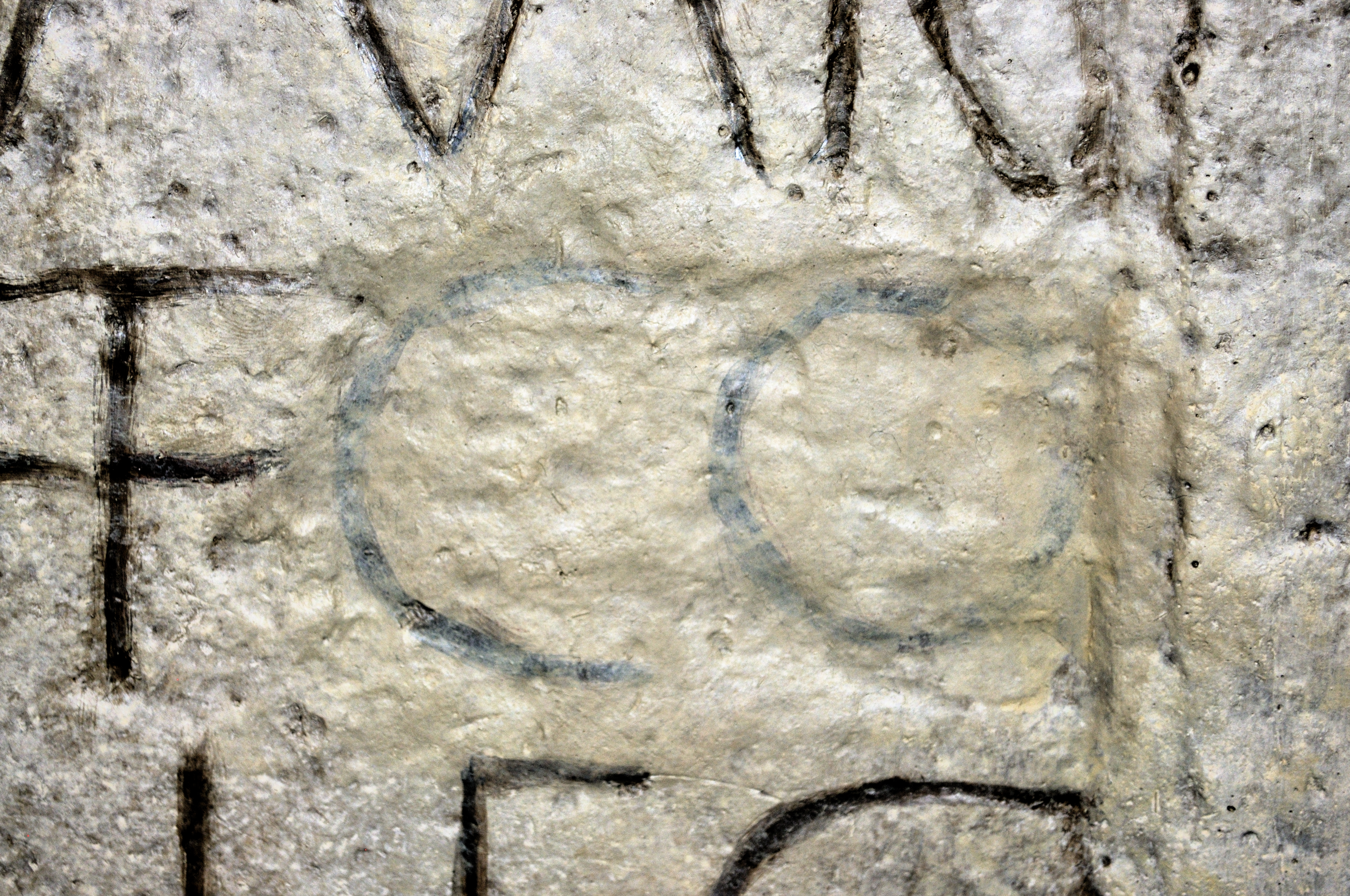
Damnatio memoriae of Commodus on an inscription in the Museum of Roman History Osterburken. The abbreviation "CO" was later restored with paint.

=== Ancient Mesopotamia ===
According to Stefan Zawadzki, the oldest known examples of such practices come from around 3000–2000 BC. He cites the example of Lagash (an ancient city-state founded by the Sumerians in southern Mesopotamia), where preserved inscriptions concerning a conflict with another city-state, Umma, do not mention the ruler of Umma, but describe him as "the man of Umma". Zawadzki sees this as an example of deliberate degradation of the ruler of Umma to the role of an unworthy person whose name and position in history the rulers of Lagash did not want to record for posterity.

=== Ancient Egypt ===
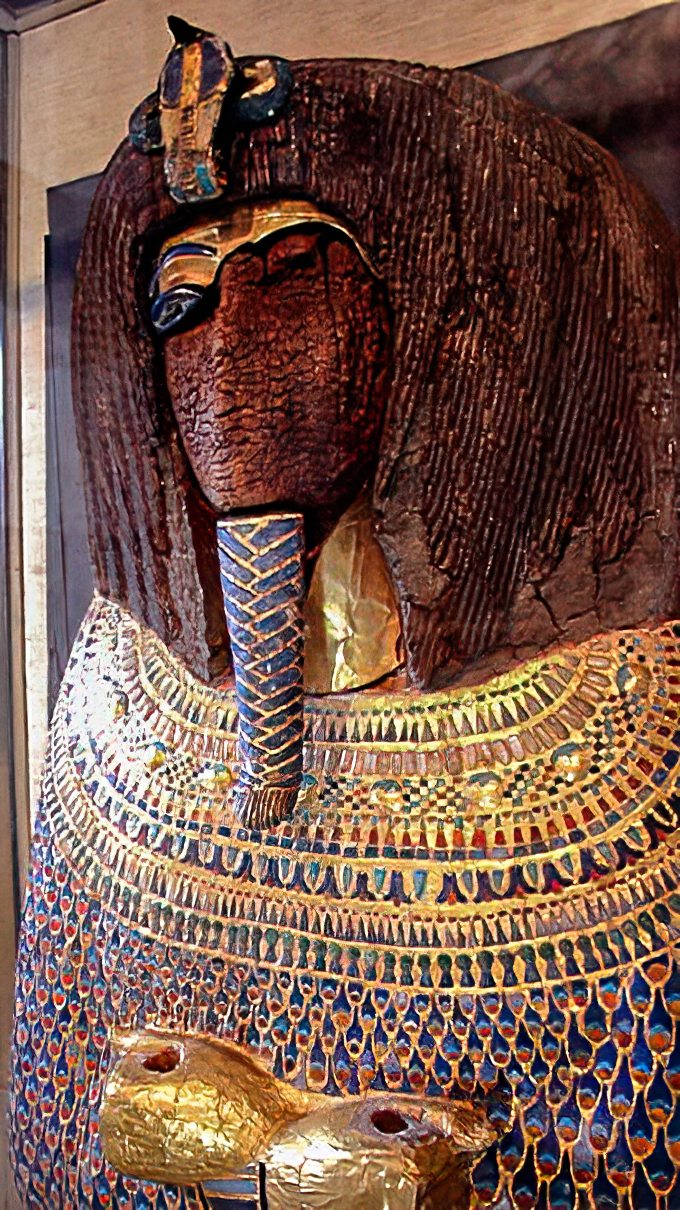
Coffin believed to belong to Akhenaten found in Tomb KV55, with the face obliterated

Ancient Egyptians also practiced this, as seen in relics from pharaoh Akhenaten's tomb and elsewhere. Akhenaten's sole worship of the god Aten, instead of the traditional pantheon, was considered heretical. During his reign, Akhenaten endeavoured to have all references to the god Amun chipped away and removed. After his reign, temples to Aten were dismantled and the stones reused to create other temples. Images of Akhenaten had their faces chipped away, his name was erased, his reign referred to as "the time of the enemy of Akhetaten", and images and references to Amun reappeared. The people blamed their misfortunes on Akhenaten's shift of worship to Atenism, away from the gods they served before him.

Other Egyptian victims of this practice include Hatshepsut and the pharaohs that immediately succeeded Akhenaten, including Smenkhkare, Neferneferuaten, and Ay. The campaign of damnatio memoriae against Akhenaten and his successors was initiated by Ay's successor, Horemheb, who decided to erase from history all pharaohs associated with the unpopular Amarna Period; this process was continued by Horemheb's successors.

=== Ancient Greece ===
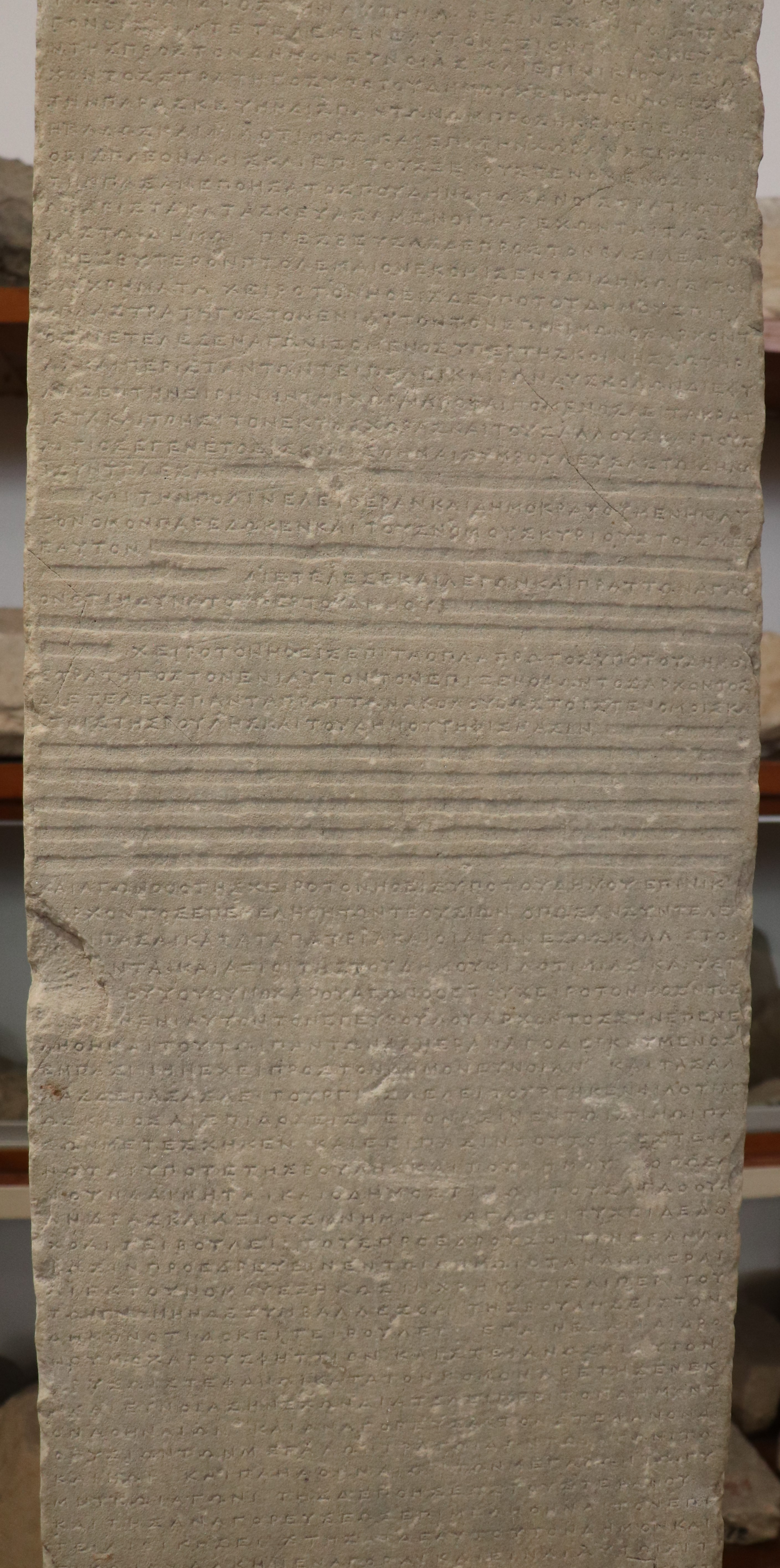
Part of an honorific decree for Phaedrus of Sphettus, passed in 259/8 BC. The lines mentioning Phaedrus' interactions with the Antigonids were chiselled out as part of the damnatio memoriae of 200 BC.

The practice was known in Ancient Greece. The Athenians frequently destroyed inscriptions which referred to individuals or events that they no longer wished to commemorate. After Timotheus was convicted of treason and removed from his post as general in 373 BC, all references to him as a general were deleted from the previous year's naval catalogue. The most complete example is their systematic removal of all references to the Antigonids from inscriptions in their city, in 200 BC when they were besieged by the Antigonid king Philip V of Macedon during the Second Macedonian War. One decree praising Demetrius Poliorcetes (Philip V's great-grandfather) was smashed and thrown down a well.

After Herostratus set fire to the Temple of Artemis, one of the Seven Wonders of antiquity, the people of Ephesus banned the mention of his name.

At Delphi, an honorific inscription erected between 337 and 327 BC for Aristotle and his nephew Callisthenes, two philosophers who were closely associated with the Macedonians, were smashed and thrown in a well after the death of Alexander of Macedon in 323 BC.

=== Ancient Rome ===
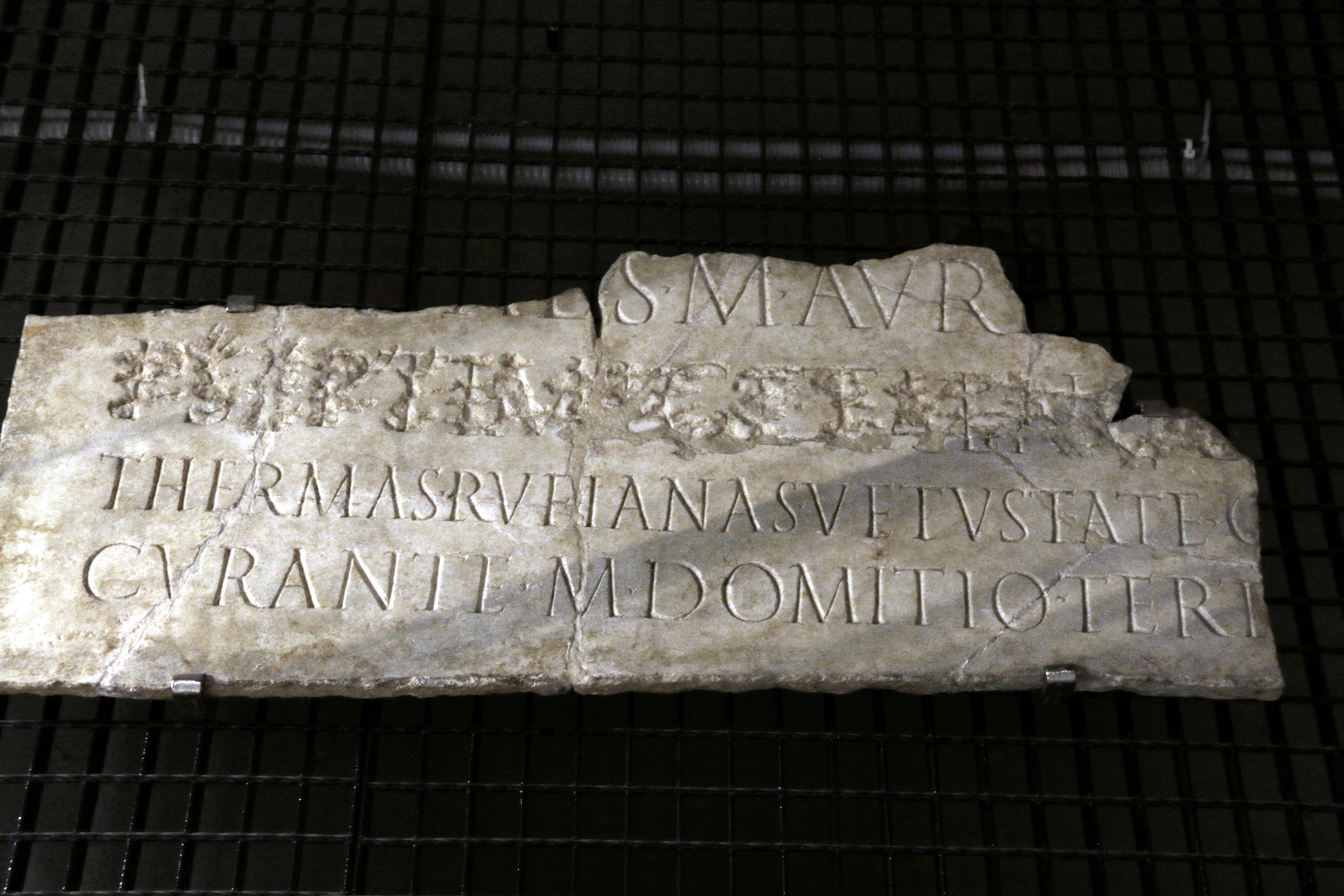
Erased mention of Geta in an inscription after his damnatio memoriae (Museo Archeologico Nazionale di Cagliari)

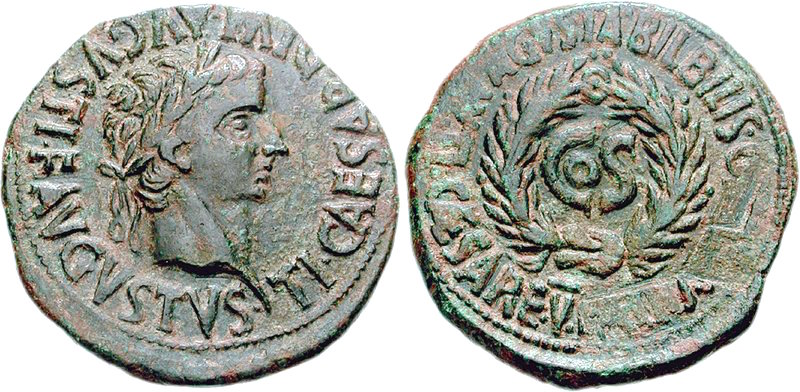
Lucius Aelius Sejanus suffered damnatio memoriae following a failed conspiracy to overthrow emperor Tiberius in AD 31. His statues were destroyed and his name obliterated from all public records. The above coin from Augusta Bilbilis, originally struck to mark the consulship of Sejanus, has the words L. Aelio Seiano obliterated.

In ancient Rome, the practice of damnatio memoriae was the condemnation of emperors after their deaths. If the Senate or a later emperor did not like the acts of an emperor, they could have his property seized, his name erased and his statues reworked (normally defaced).

A completely successful damnatio memoriae results—by definition—in the full and total erasure of the subject from the historical record. In the case of figures such as emperors or consuls it is unlikely that complete success was possible, as even comprehensive obliteration of the person's existence and actions in records and the like would continue to be historically visible without extensive reworking. The impracticality of such a cover-up could be vast—in the case of Emperor Geta, for example, coins bearing his effigy proved difficult to entirely remove from circulation for several years, even though the mere mention of his name was punishable by death.

Difficulties in implementation also arose if there was not full and enduring agreement with the punishment, such as when the Senate's condemnation of Nero was implemented—leading to attacks on many of his statues—but subsequently evaded with the enormous funeral he was given by Vitellius. Similarly, it was often difficult to prevent later historians from "resurrecting" the memory of the sanctioned person.

The impossibility of actually erasing memory of an emperor has led scholars to conclude that this was not actually the goal of damnatio. Instead, they understand damnatio:

not so much as an attempt to obliterate memory entirely as to transform honorific commemoration into a form of visible denigration. That is: the power of an act of damnatio relies, at least in part, on the viewer of a monument being able to supplement the gaps in an inscription with their own knowledge of what those gaps had once contained, and the reasons why the text had been removed

— Polly Low, "Remembering, Forgetting, and Rewriting the Past"

These emperors are known to have been erased from monuments:

| Emperor | Reign | Notes |
|---|---|---|
| Caligula | 37–41 | Disputed whether per senate decree |
| Nero | 54–68 | hostis iudicatio (posthumous trial for treason) |
| Domitian | 81–96 | per senate decree (96) |
| Avidius Cassius | | Usurper |
| Commodus | 177–192 | per senate decree (192) |
| Didius Julianus | 193 | per senate decree (193) |
| Pescennius Niger | | Usurper |
| Clodius Albinus | | Usurper |
| Geta | 209–211 | per his brother Caracalla |
| Macrinus | 217–218 | Usurper |
| Diadumenian | 217–218 | Usurper |
| Elagabalus | 218–222 | |
| Severus Alexander | 222–235 | Only during the reign of Maximinus Thrax |
| Maximinus Thrax | 235–238 | per senate decree (238) |
| Maximus I | | Caesar only |
| Philip the Arab | 244–249 | |
| Philip II | 247–249 | Philip the Arab's son |
| Decius | 249–251 | |
| Herennius Etruscus | 251 | Decius' son |
| Hostilian | 251 | Decius' son |
| Aemilianus | 253 | |
| Gallienus | 253–268 | |
| Aurelian | 270–275 | Briefly |
| Probus | 276–282 | |
| Carus | 282–283 | |
| Carinus | 284–285 | |
| Numerian | 283–284 | |
| Diocletian | 284–305 | |
| Maximian | 286–305 | per senate decree (310) |
| Galerius | 305–311 | |
| Valerius Severus | 306–307 | Partially rehabilitated by Galerius |
| Maximinus II | 308–313 | per senate decree (313) |
| Maxentius | 306–312 | |
| Licinius | 308–324 | |
| Crispus | 317–326 | Caesar; briefly |
| Constantine II | 337–340 | |
| Constans | 337–350 | |
| Nepotian | | Usurper |
| Magnentius | | Usurper |
| Decentius | | Caesar only and brother of Magnentius |
| Procopius | | Usurper |
| Magnus Maximus | 384–388 | Usurper |
| Flavius Victor | 384–388 | Son and co-emperor of Magnus Maximus |
| Eugenius | 392–394 | Usurper |
| Priscus Attalus | 409–410; 414–415 | Puppet emperor |
| Joannes | 423–425 | Usurper in the west |
| Basiliscus | 475–476 | |
| Michael V | 1041–1042 | |

The damnatio memoriae was also subjected to non-emperors:

| Person | Date | Notes |
|---|---|---|
| Longinus | 42 BC | One of Caesar's assassins |
| Brutus | 42 BC | Most famous of Caesar's assassins |
| Mark Antony | 30 BC | Politician and general |
| Cornelius Gallus | ? | first prefect of egypt |
| Piso | 20 AD | Accused of murdering Germanicus |
| Sejanus | 31 | Praetorian prefect of Tiberius |
| Gaius Silius | 48 | Lover of Claudius's wife |
| Messalina | 48 | Wife of Claudius |
| Perennis | 185 | Praetorian prefect of Commodus |
| Cleander | 190 | Praetorian prefect and favorite of Commodus |
| Plautianus | 205 | Praetorian prefect of Septimius Severus |
| Fausta | 326 | Wife of Constantine I |
| Philippus | 351 | Rehabilated by Constantius II |
| Eutropius | 399 | Per senate decree |
| Stilicho | 408 (?) | It is known that his statues were destroyed and his name was removed from inscriptions |

== Middle Ages ==
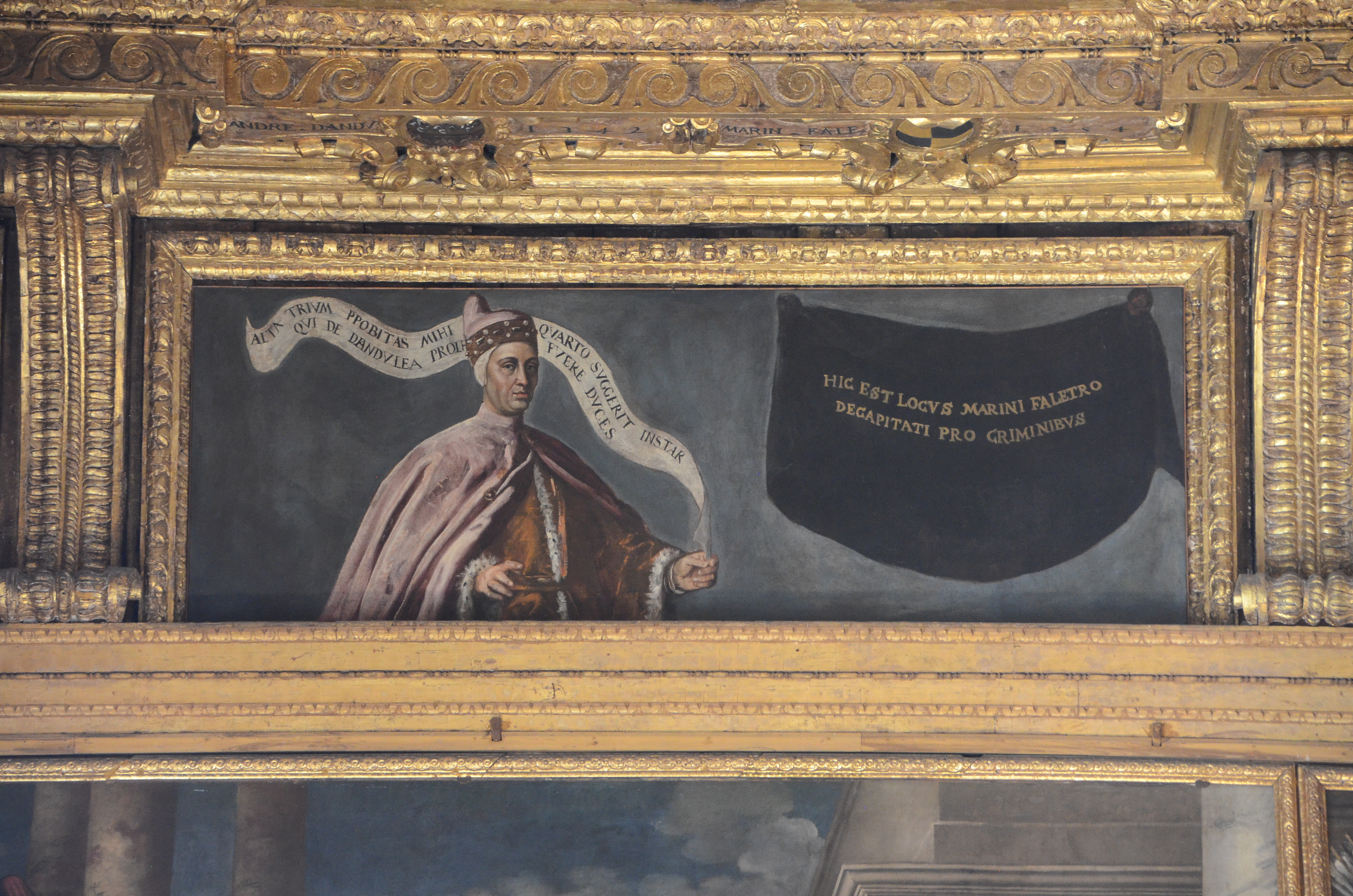
The Doge of Venice Marino Faliero's portrait (right) was removed and painted over with a black shroud as damnatio memoriae for his attempted coup. The shroud bears the Latin phrase, "This is the space for Marino Faliero, beheaded for crimes."

In the Middle Ages, heresiarchs could have their memory condemned. The Council of Constance decreed the damnatio memoriae of John Wycliffe.

The practice of replacing pagan beliefs and motifs with Christian, and purposefully not recording the pagan history, has been compared to damnatio memoriae as well.

After usurping power, the Yongle Emperor began a propaganda campaign and attempted to erase the reign of the Jianwen Emperor. The education system itself was revised, with no mention of the previous civil war that had preceded his era. Zhu Di's treatment of loyalists of the preceding ruler such as Jing Qing later became a proverb "瓜蔓抄" or "gourd vine search" owing to his brutal actions such as wiping out entire towns to erase the Jianwen from records. However, with the advent of the Qing, the martyrs of the Jianwen era had not only become revered as deities, but they also became openly praised in order to discredit the Ming Dynasty.

In her book Medici Women – Portraits of Power, Love and Betrayal, Gabrielle Langdon also presents evidence concerning a probable damnatio memoriae issued against Isabella de' Medici, a prominent female figure of the 16th century Renaissance Medici court.

== Americas ==
=== Ancient Maya ===
Several apparent damnatio memoriae incidents occurred within the Maya civilization during the Classic period (AD 250–900) as a result of political conflicts between leaders of the local kingdoms.

One notable incident occurred in the kingdom of Paʼ Chan (modern-day Yaxchilan, Mexico) in the middle of the 8th century. In June 742, the k'uhul ajaw (Holy Lord, i.e. king) of Pa' Chan, Itzamnaaj Bahlam III, died after a 60-year-long rule, during which he turned his kingdom into one of great riches after a large number of military campaigns which were recorded and illustrated on multiple high-quality stelae, lintels and hieroglyphic steps of temples which he dedicated to his military success (e.g. Temple 44) and his family (e.g. Temple 23). Though he had a son who eventually ascended to the throne after his death, there was a mysterious decade-long interregnum period in which Pa' Chan did not record the existence of any king. Itzamnaaj Bahlam's son, Yaxun Bʼalam IV, also known as Bird Jaguar IV, ascended to the throne in April 752, nearly ten years after his father's death.

This interregnum period may be explained by a text from the nearby northern kingdom of Yokib (modern-day Piedras Negras, Guatemala). Panel 3 of this city, largely regarded as one of the most beautiful pieces of Mayan art, was carved approximately in 782 and illustrates an episode of the reign of Itzam Kʼan Ahk II (also known as Pawaaj Kʼan Ahk II), in which he celebrated his first kʼatun (period of 7200 days) as king, on 27 July 749. Panel 3 claims that the celebration "was witnessed by Sak Jukub Yopaat Bahlam, Holy Lord of Paʼ Chan." Also known as Yopaat Bahlam II, this mysterious ruler does not appear anywhere else in the historical record, not even in his supposed homeland. Moreover, his respectful presence at a celebration in Yokib, Paʼ Chan's centuries-old and bitter rival (which had, in fact, scored a victory in battle against Itzamnaaj Bahlam III in 726), as well as the depiction of Itzam Kʼan Ahk apparently addressing a speech (now hardly readable, but probably involving an event of Paʼ Chan's past) toward a party from Paʼ Chan—which included his son and "heir to the throne" of Paʼ Chan (chʼok paʼchan ajaw), Sihyaj Ahkteʼ—, possibly indicate that he ruled as a vassal of Itzam Kʼan Ahk, or that he used the celebration as an opportunity to ask for Itzam Kʼan Ahk's support against Yaxun Bʼalam IV, his political rival. This has led to the conclusion that if this man truly ruled Paʼ Chan, any records of his existence were destroyed during the reign of Yaxun Bʼalam IV, who notoriously led a massive propaganda campaign throughout his rule to claim legitimacy over the throne, which involved the rewriting of his kingdom's dynastic history and restoration of several historical records of previous kings. The immense texts writing Yaxun Bʼalam's own version of his kingdom's dynastic history may have been carved over existing records which would have been intentionally erased with plaster, possibly destroying the records of the king (or kings) of the interregnum.

It is possible Yopaat Bahlam and his son lived the rest of their lives in exile at Yokib, and that the "heir to the throne" never rose to power. Yopaat Bahlam may have been buried in Burial 13 of the city, judging from a text carved on four Spondylus limbatus shells found within it which bears his name and mentions that he had previously visited the city in January 747, also within the interregnum.

=== New Spain ===
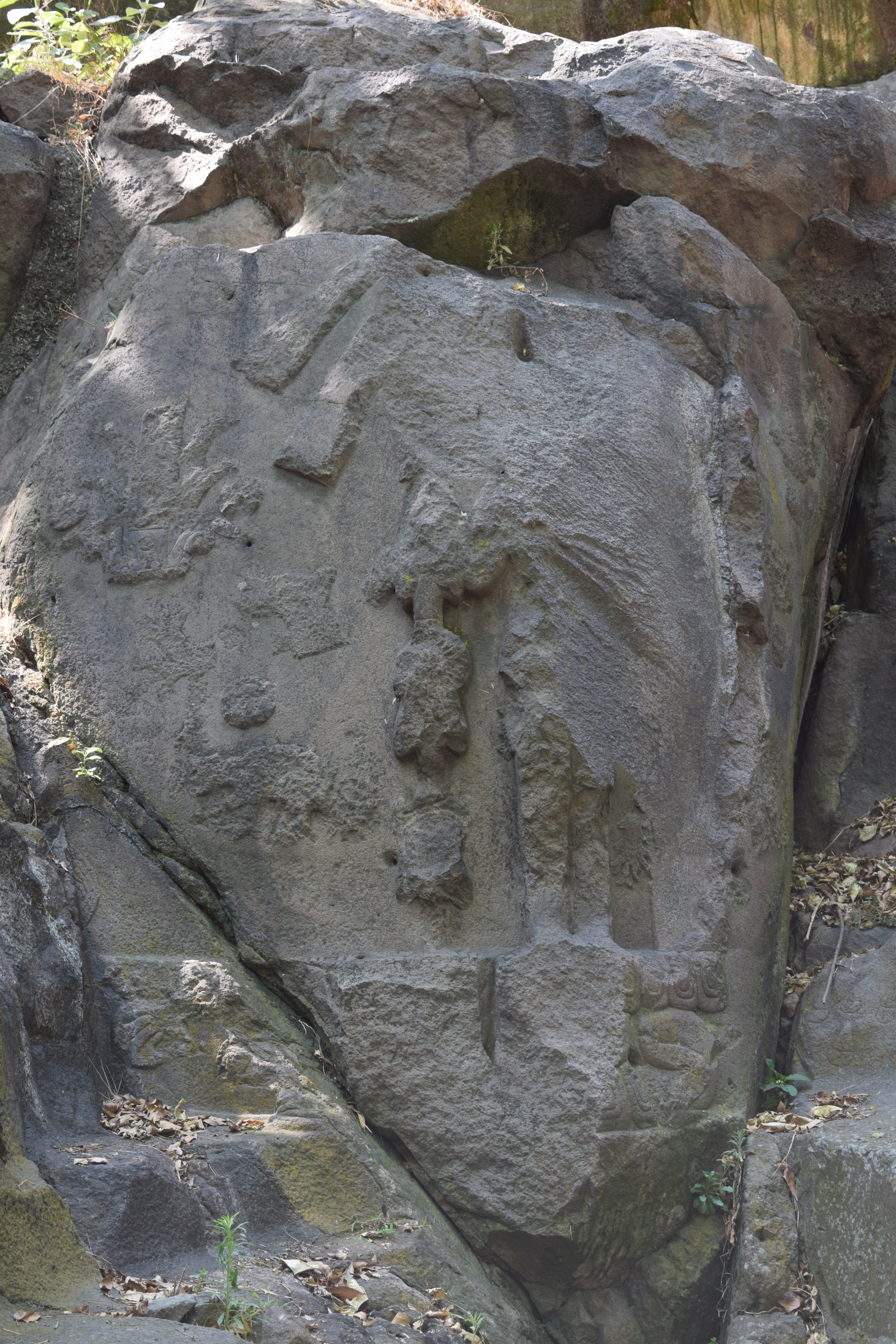
The Chapultepec portrait of Moctezuma II, made in 1519 and intentionally damaged in the middle of the 18th century, is the only surviving Chapultepec portrait of a Mexica monarch.

Moctezuma I (not to be confused with his more famous great-grandson Moctezuma II), 15th-century huei tlahtoani (Great Speaker, i.e. emperor) of the Excan Tlahtoloyan (lit. Triple Capital), known by historians as the Mexica or Aztec Empire (also known as the Aztec Triple Alliance, whose inhabitants referred to themselves as Culhua-Mexica), ordered the creation of a portrait of himself and of his military and political advisor Tlacaelel at Chapultepec, a historically and naturally important site which is within Mexico City in modern times. This became a tradition among subsequent Mexica rulers, and portraits of Axayacatl and Ahuizotl, two of Moctezuma's successors, were also made throughout the rest of the century (Tizoc's absence may be explained by his sudden death from poisoning). Moctezuma II would create the last portrait of this kind in 1519 (which Hajovsky (2015, p. 118) believes might be "the last Aztec monument"), at the eve of the Spanish conquest.

Antonio de León y Gama, a distinguished Mexican intellectual, wrote in the late 18th century that these portraits were well preserved up until that century. León y Gama claimed that the only portrait he got to see himself was Moctezuma II's, before its destruction was ordered by the authorities in 1753 or 1754. He mentioned that Axayacatl's portrait still existed earlier in that century before it was "broken up and removed." Indeed, the remains of Moctezuma's portrait, approximately 2 meters (over 6 feet) high, reveal that its damage was not accidental or natural. It was carved on pink-to-gray andesite, which is "slightly harder than marble," according to Hajovsky. The markings in the damaged parts show that apparently its destruction was executed with the dropping of a boulder, and that deep holes were drilled "perhaps in order to pry the stone apart or blow it up."

In another notorious instance, Spanish bishop Juan de Zumárraga ordered the destruction of a portrait depicting Nezahualcoyotl, king of Texcoco, on 7 July 1539, along with various other sculptures at the Hill of Texcotzingo after mistaking historical remembrance for idolatry and had it done "in a manner such that they would no longer be remembered."

During the Mexican War of Independence, which started in 1810, one of the earliest revolutionary leaders, Miguel Hidalgo y Costilla, nowadays remembered as a national Hero, was executed by the Spanish authorities in 1811. After his execution, according to contemporary accounts, the authorities declared a damnatio memoriae. According to one of Hidalgo's soldiers, Pedro García (1790–1873), "the fierce war against Hidalgo's memory and his ideas" was done through strict censorship.

It became illegal to speak about Hidalgo anywhere, it became a great crime that was severely punished. This is the reason why no portrait which resembles him at all is found anywhere in the country, since the prohibition lasted nearly ten years. Nobody felt safe speaking inside their homes.

The Spanish efforts to erase his memory, however, were in vain. The War of Independence continued, and the leaders who continued the revolution after Hidalgo's death made great efforts to commemorate his legacy. José María Morelos, for example, declared in 1813 that 16 September, the anniversary of the beginning of the war, would be celebrated every year "remembering always the merit of the great Hero Don Miguel Hidalgo and his partner Don Ignacio Allende."

== Similar practices in modern times ==
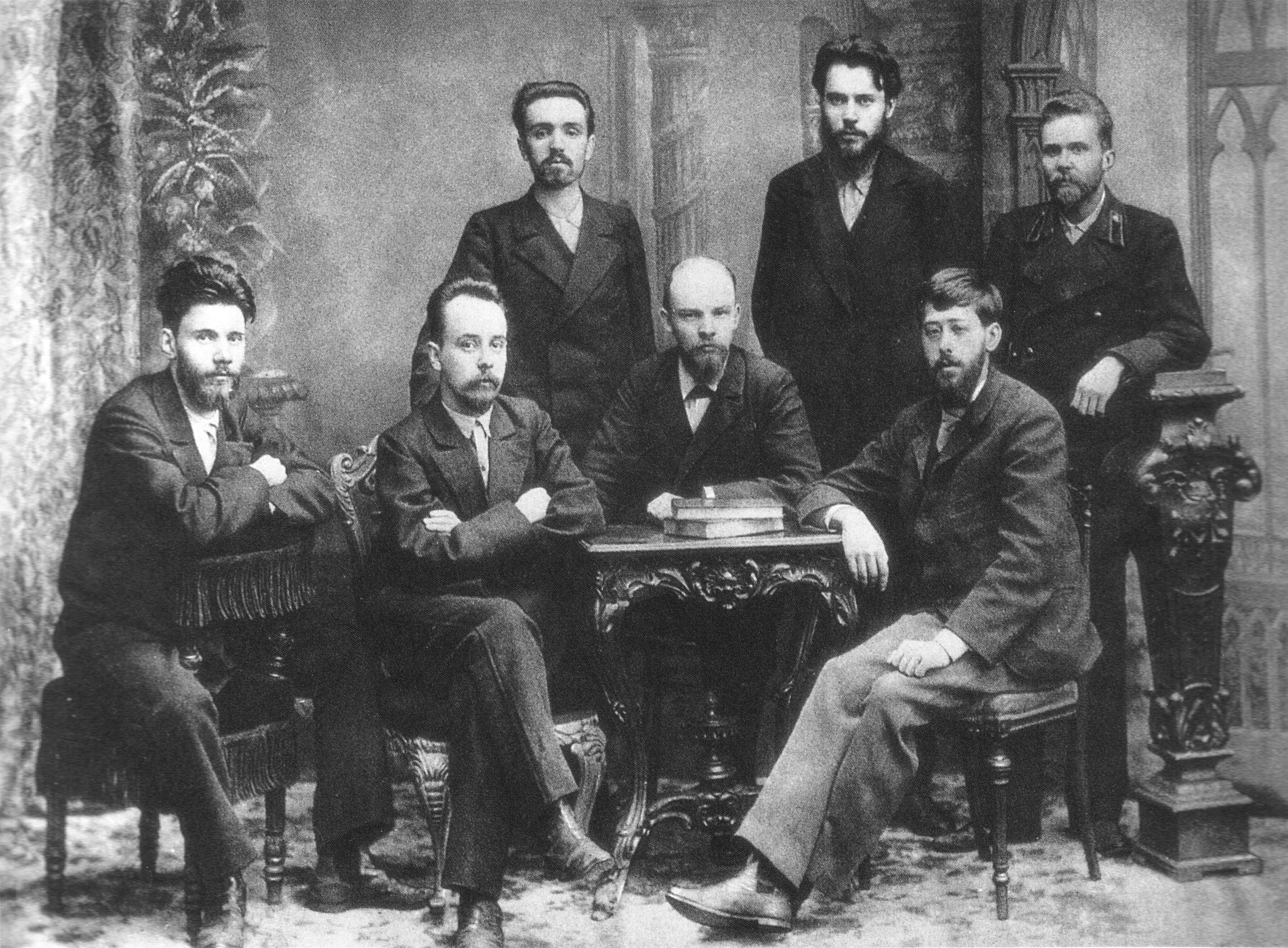
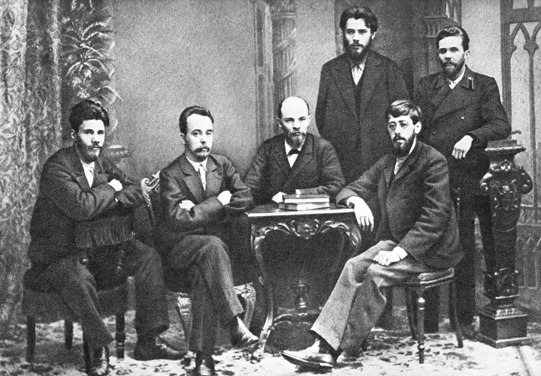
Alexander Malchenko, an early socialist revolutionary, removed due to his support of J. Martov
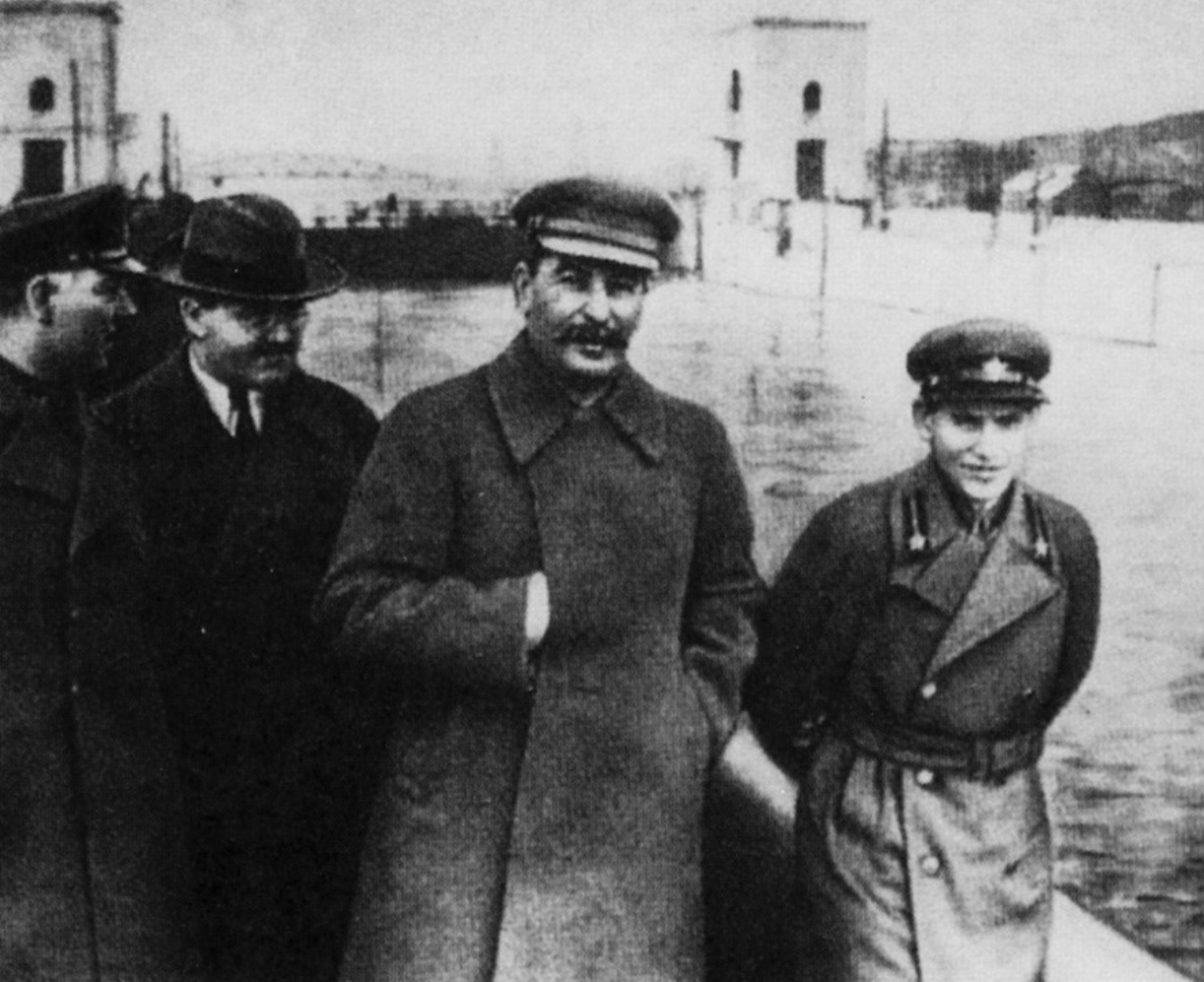
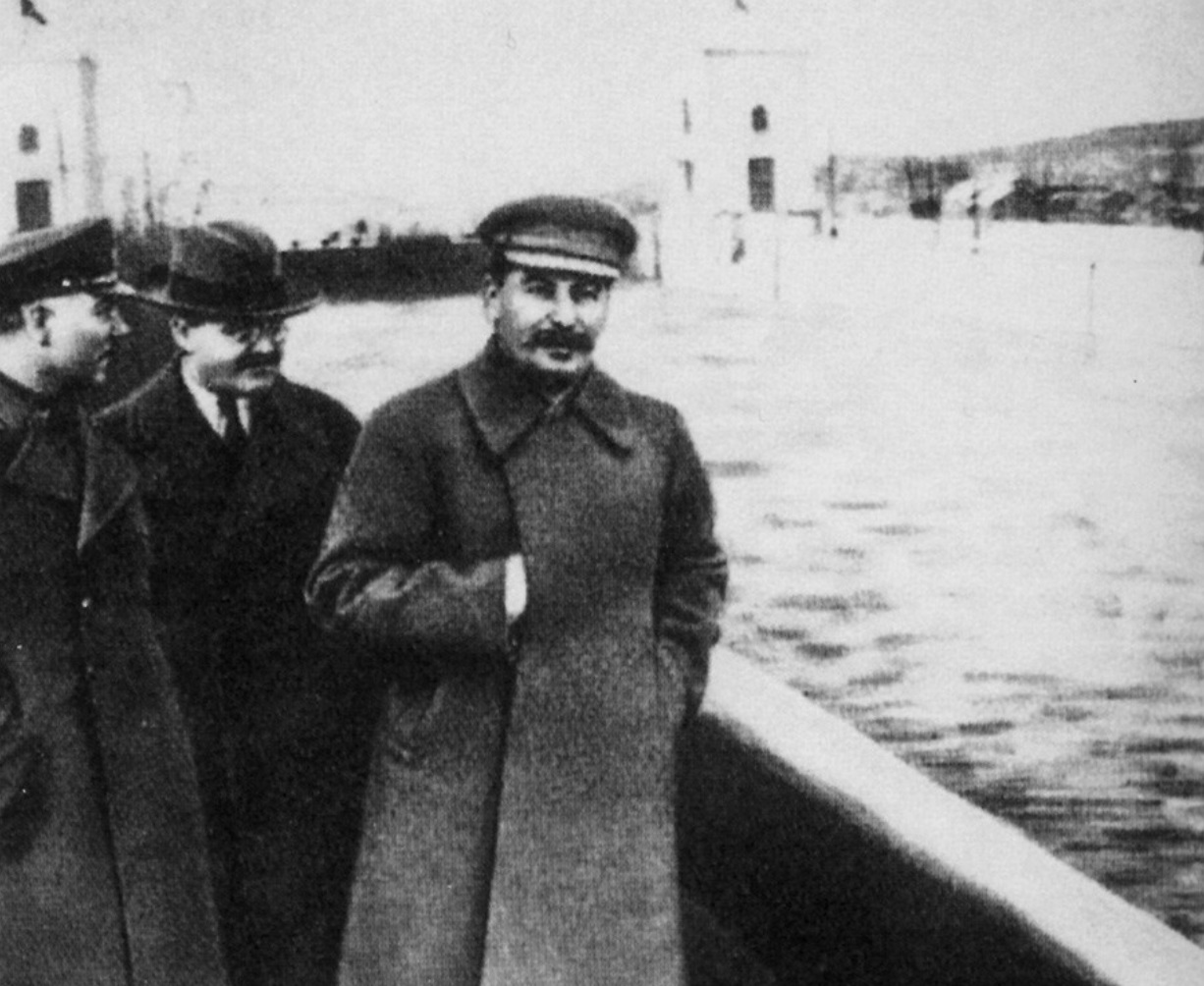
Nikolai Yezhov was posthumously removed from pictures after his 1940 execution.

=== Soviet Union ===
==== During the Soviet period ====
In the Soviet Union, photos were retouched to remove individuals such as Leon Trotsky, Nikolay Yezhov, and even Stalin. After Stalin ordered the murder of Grigory Kulik's wife Kira Kulik-Simonich, all photographic records of her were destroyed; although she was described as very pretty, no photographs or other images of her survive. Following their fall from favour, Lavrentiy Beria and others were removed from articles in the Great Soviet Encyclopedia.

==== Damnatio memoriae of the Soviet Union in post-Communist countries ====
Following the fall of communism in Eastern Europe, many communist statues, particularly of Lenin and Stalin, were removed from former Soviet satellite states. Following a 2015 decision, a process of decommunization in Ukraine successfully dismantled all 1,320 statues of Lenin after its independence, as well as renaming roads and structures named under Soviet authority.

=== Poland ===
19th century Polish writers often omitted mentioning two kings from the list of Polish monarchs, Bezprym and Wenceslaus III of Bohemia, which has resulted in their being omitted from many later works as well.

=== China ===
The treatment of Chinese politician Zhao Ziyang following his fall from grace inside the Chinese Communist Party is regarded as another modern case of damnatio memoriae.

The major painting The Founding Ceremony of the Nation has been modified several times as individuals depicted have fallen from political favour or been rehabilitated.

=== Germany ===
The destruction of all copies of The Victory of Faith in order to erase Ernst Röhm is considered an act of Nazi damnatio memoriae. In the end, two copies survived: one preserved by the Communist government of East Germany and one preserved in London that belonged to the film's creator Leni Riefenstahl.

=== Japan ===
In 2023, extensive revelations were publicized that Johnny Kitagawa (1931–2019)—founder and manager of the talent agency Johnny & Associates—had committed repeated acts of sexual abuse from at least the 1970s through the mid-2010s, including the rape of hundreds of adolescent boys who were signed to the agency. In the wake of the scandal, Kitagawa's niece Julie Keiko Fujishima stated that she wanted to "erase all that remains of Johnny from this world". Noriyuki Higashiyama—who succeeded Fujishima as president of Johnny & Associates in September 2023—moved to rebrand all company divisions and units which posthumously bared or referenced the Johnny's name, including its record label J-Storm (which was renamed Storm Labels), and groups such as Johnny's West and Kanjani Eight (which were renamed West. and Super Eight respectively). Johnny & Associates itself was renamed Smile-Up (after the agency's charity initiative) and began focusing primarily on reparations of the sexual abuse cases, while a new agency known as Starto Entertainment was formed to take on talent who were formerly signed to Johnny & Associates.

=== New Zealand ===
After the Christchurch mosque shootings in 2019, Prime Minister Jacinda Ardern vowed never to refer to the gunman as a specific person, explaining, "He sought many things from his act of terror, but one was notoriety - that is why you will never hear me mention his name".

=== North Korea ===
In December 2013, Jang Song-thaek was abruptly accused of being a counter-revolutionary and was stripped of all his posts, expelled from the Workers' Party of Korea (WPK), arrested and executed. After his execution, his photos were removed from official media and his image digitally removed from photos and videos with other North Korean leaders.

=== United Kingdom ===
In October 2012, extensive revelations were publicized that British television personality Jimmy Savile (1926–2011) had committed repeated acts of sexual abuse throughout his career, with many of these cases involving child sexual abuse tied to his work at the BBC (including his role as presenter of youth-targeted programmes such as Jim'll Fix It and Top of the Pops) and charity work with the NHS. These accusations prompted a larger police investigation known as Operation Yewtree, culminating in a joint report with the NSPCC that reported a total of 214 alleged criminal offenses by Saville and an estimated 450 victims, of whom 328 were underage at the time.

In response to the revelations, various public institutions in the United Kingdom took extensive measures to remove posthumous relics of Savile's public presence, including the removal of monuments and memorials to Savile (including his headstone), rechristening locations and awards previously named after him, dissolving charity organizations named after him, and broadcasters pulling episodes of television and radio programmes which featured or explicitly referenced him. In the immediate aftermath of the scandal, BBC News reporter Finlo Rohrer commented that "as bloggers have already noted, the Romans would have understood the Savile erasures as damnatio memoriae [...] people will be able to see the spot where a plaque to him once rested. They may know that a path was once named after him."

=== United States ===
Memorials to Continental general Benedict Arnold at the Saratoga National Historical Park and the United States Military Academy bear neither his name nor his likeness, as a result of his treason. The Boot Monument at Saratoga National Historical Park pays tribute to Arnold and his accomplishments but does not mention his name. The plaque at the military academy says simply, "Major General. Born 1740."

In January 2025, U.S. president Donald Trump signed multiple executive orders prohibiting the practice of diversity, equity, and inclusion (DEI) by the U.S. federal government and its agencies, alleging that they constitute reverse discrimination against a white majority. To comply with the ruling, many federal government institutions and websites actively removed and/or censored references to women, people of color, and members of the LGBTQ community.

== Analysis ==
The term is used in modern scholarship to cover a wide array of official and unofficial sanctions through which the physical remnants and memories of a deceased individual are destroyed.

Looking at cases of damnatio memoriae in modern Irish history, Guy Beiner has argued that iconoclastic vandalism only makes martyrs of the "dishonored", thus ensuring that they will be remembered for all time. Nonetheless, Beiner goes on to argue that the purpose of damnatio memoriae—rather than being to erase people from history—was to guarantee only negative memories of those who were so dishonored. Pointing out that damnatio memoriae did not erase people from history but in effect kept their memory alive, Beiner concluded that those who partake in the destruction of a monument should be considered agents of memory.

Author Charles Hedrick proposes that a distinction be made between damnatio memoriae (the condemnation of a deceased person) and abolitio memoriae (the actual erasure of another from historical texts).

In case of removal of Soviet monuments in Eastern Europe, the primary reason was that they were established as a symbol of occupation, domination or cult of personality, rather than simple historic mark. It has been pointed out that all Nazi-established monuments and street names have been removed after World War II which has been perceived as natural reaction after liberation at that time.

== See also ==
- Anathema
- Censorship in Italy
- Censorship in North Korea
- Censorship of images in the Soviet Union
- Historical negationism
- Memoricide
- Memory hole
- Naming taboo, not naming as a mark of respect
- Persona non grata
- Proscription
- Removal of Confederate monuments and memorials
- Yimakh shemo, an equivalent concept in Judaism

== Bibliography ==
- Low, Polly (2020). "Remembering, Forgetting, and Rewriting the Past: Athenian Inscriptions and Collective Memory". In Constantakopoulou, C.; Fragoulaki, M. (eds.). Shaping Memory in Ancient Greece: Poetry, Historiography, and Epigraphy (PDF). Histos Supplements. pp. 235–68. doi:10.29173/histos34.
