= Fang Xiaoru =

Chinese scholar and official (1357–1402)

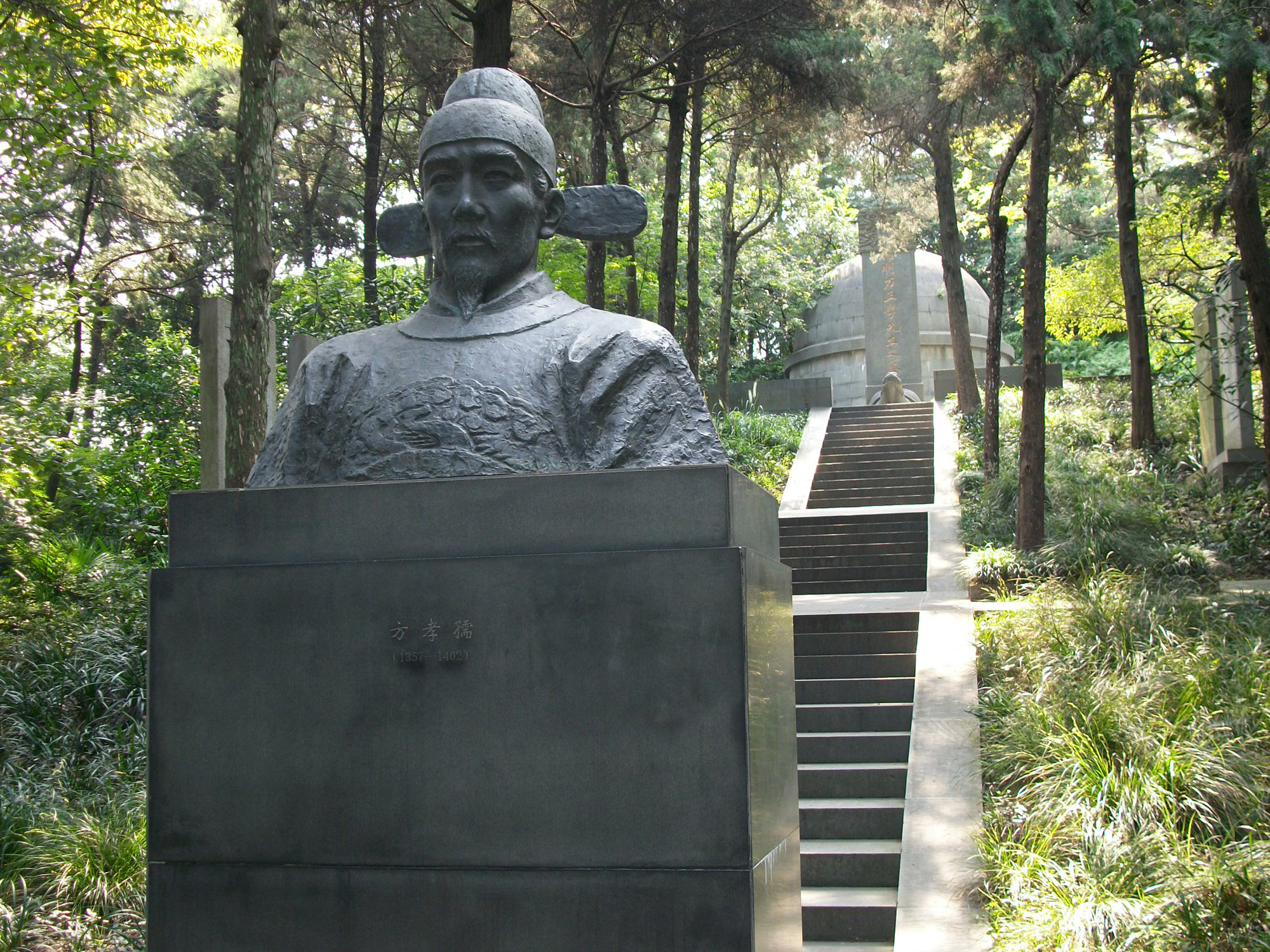
- Born: 1357; Ninghai, Zhejiang, Yuan dynasty
- Died: 25 July 1402 (aged 44–45); Nanjing, Ming dynasty
- Cause of death: Disputed (according to one account, Fang was executed by lingchi during China's only instance of an extermination of the ten degrees of kinship)

Fang Xiaoru (Chinese: 方孝孺; pinyin: Fāng Xìaorú; 1357 – 25 July 1402), courtesy name Xizhi (希直) or Xigu (希古), a native of Ninghai County, Zhejiang (present-day Ningbo, Zhejiang), was a Chinese official and Confucian scholar of the Ming dynasty. He was an orthodox Confucian scholar-bureaucrat, famous for his continuation of the Jinhua school of Zhu Xi and later for his loyalty to the former Jianwen Emperor (Zhu Yunwen), who died in the rebellion of the Prince of Yan (Jingnan rebellion).

== Life ==
During the Jingnan rebellion, Fang served as one of the Jianwen Emperor's closest advisors.

He was famed for his connection to Song Lian and the scholars of the Jinhua school as well as for his own talent and lucid composition.

After Zhu Di, the Prince of Yan, usurped the throne to become the Yongle Emperor in 1402, Fang Xiaoru refused to serve the new Emperor and was put to death at the age of 46.

=== Death ===
There are several different accounts of Fang's death. The official History of Ming, compiled by Qing-era scholars, records that the Yongle Emperor summoned Fang Xiaoru, and demanded Fang write an inaugural address that would compare his usurpation of the throne with the regency of the Duke of Zhou during the reign of his nephew King Cheng of Zhou in ancient China. Fang asked, "Then where is King Cheng?" Zhu replied, "He was killed by his own fire." Fang continued to press the issue, asking Zhu, "Why not enthrone King Cheng's son?" Zhu answered, "The country requires a mature ruler." Fang again asked, "What about the Emperor's brother?" Zhu answered: "That is my family matter. The address must be written by you." Fang threw his pen on the ground and refused to write the address. He was executed by lingchi (磔), and several of his family members lost their lives. Qing dynasty and modern historians generally consider this story as a political myth arose during the late Ming dynasty.

Another account, found in the 17th century text, Annals of Ming History, records a similar exchange, but adds that Fang was threatened with the extermination of nine kinships. Fang then responded: "I would be fine with ten!" Thus, along with his extended family, many of his students and peers were arrested and executed as the "10th kinship". Altogether, 873 people are said to have been executed.

The 19th-century text, Comprehensive History of Ming, records an additional exchange: After the Emperor insisted on having Fang write an address, Fang picked up his pen and wrote on a paper the words "燕賊篡位" ("The Bandit of Yan usurped the throne."). The Emperor was furious and ordered his death.

The second and third account are generally considered by historians to be apocryphal; it is speculated that they were invented posthumously by Chinese literati of later generations who sympathized with Fang.

== Legacy ==
People in Fujian (闽南人) regard Fang Xiaoru, along with Tie Xuan and Jing Qing (景清), as the Sanfu Qiansui (三府千岁; "three houses, a thousand years"), or Sanwang (三王; "three king"), deities in the Wang Ye worship (王爷神).

== See also ==
- Jing Qing
- Damnatio memoriae
- Jianwen Emperor

== Gallery ==
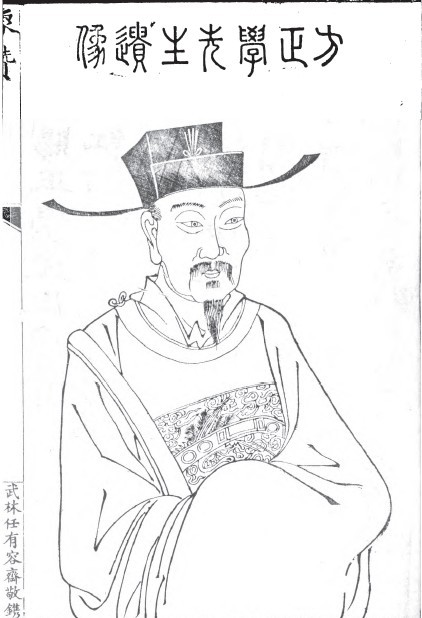
Portrait of Fang Xiaoru by Ren Yourong (任有容) of the Qing dynasty

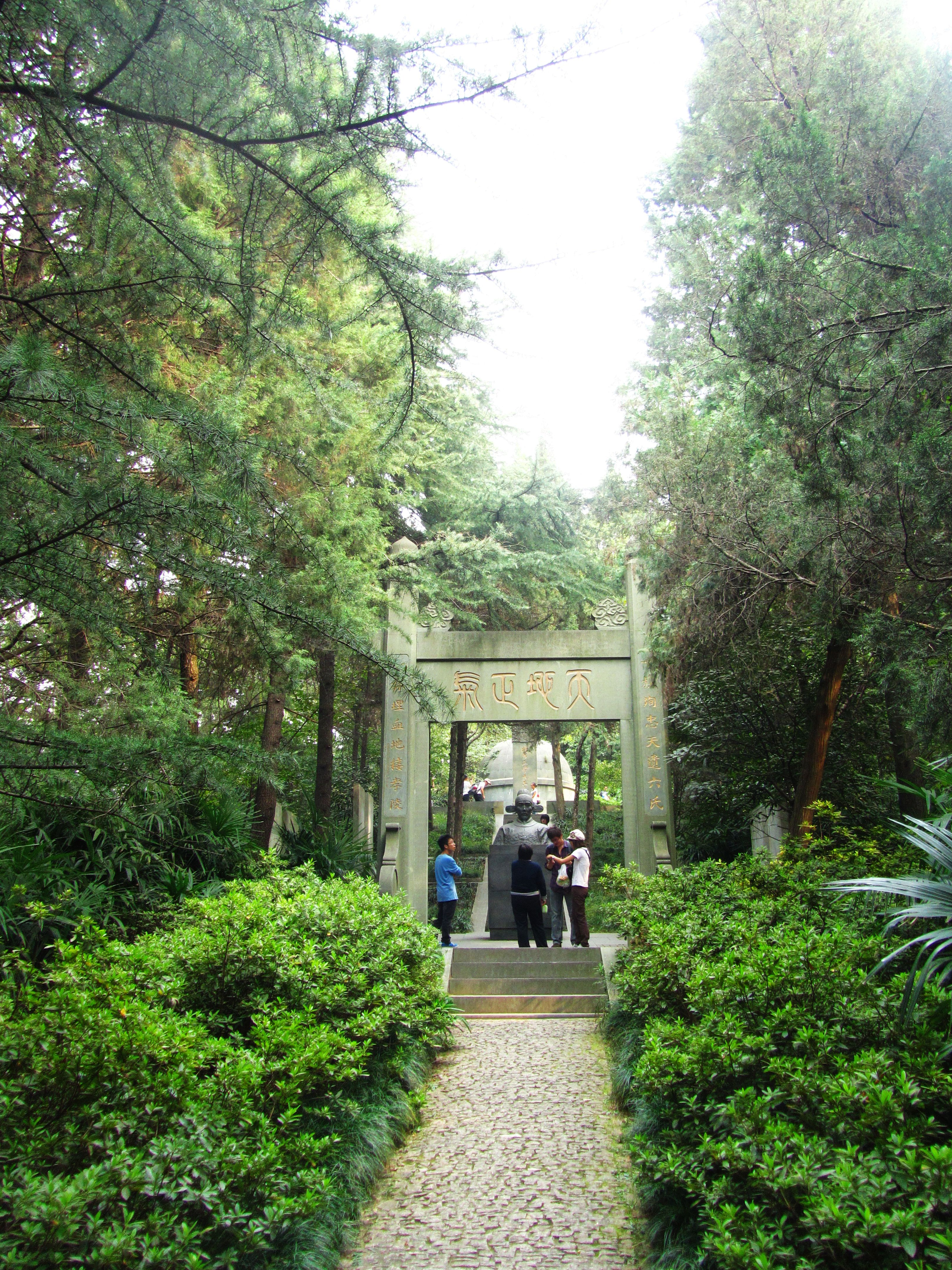
Tomb of Fang Xiaoru

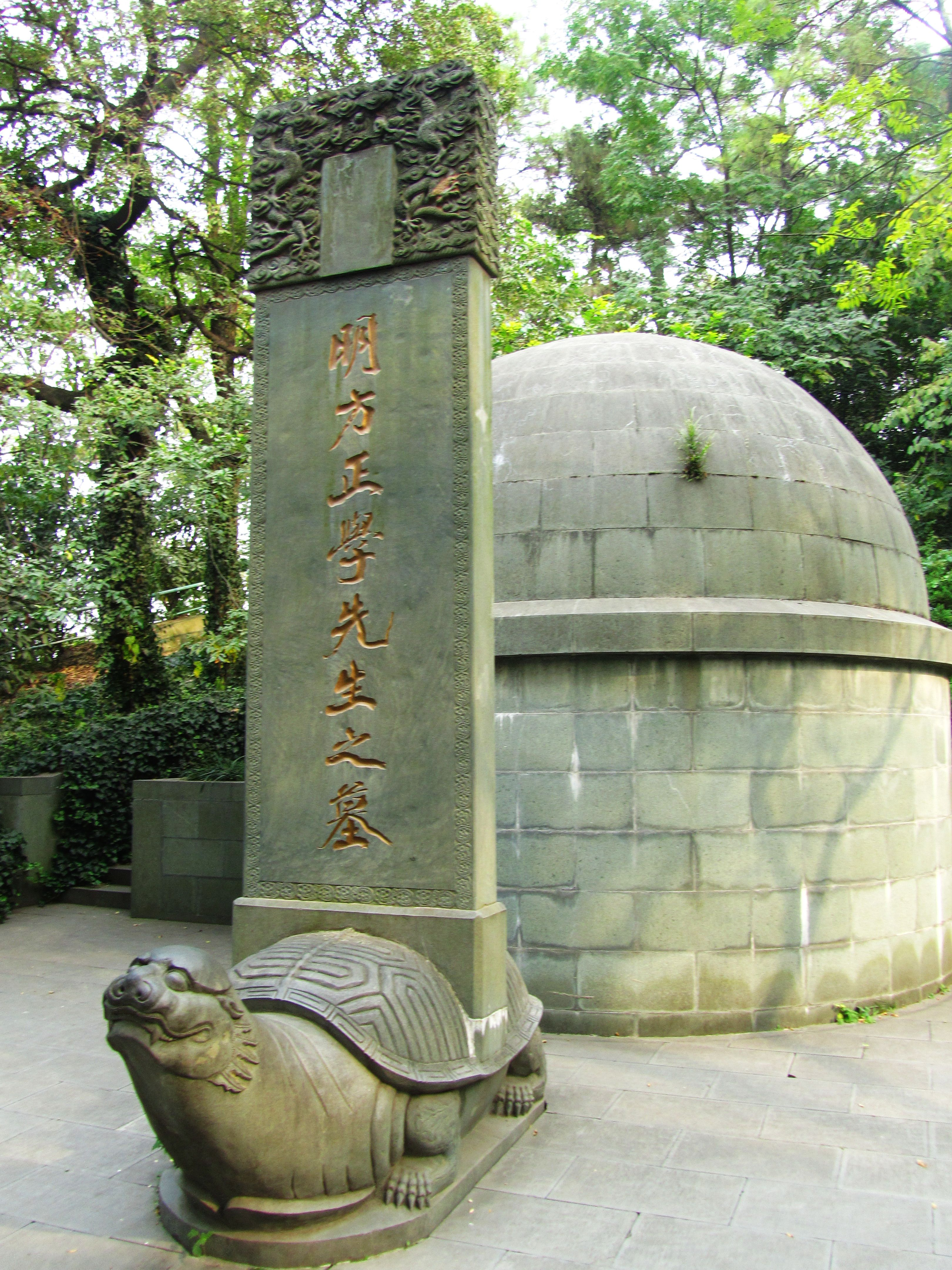

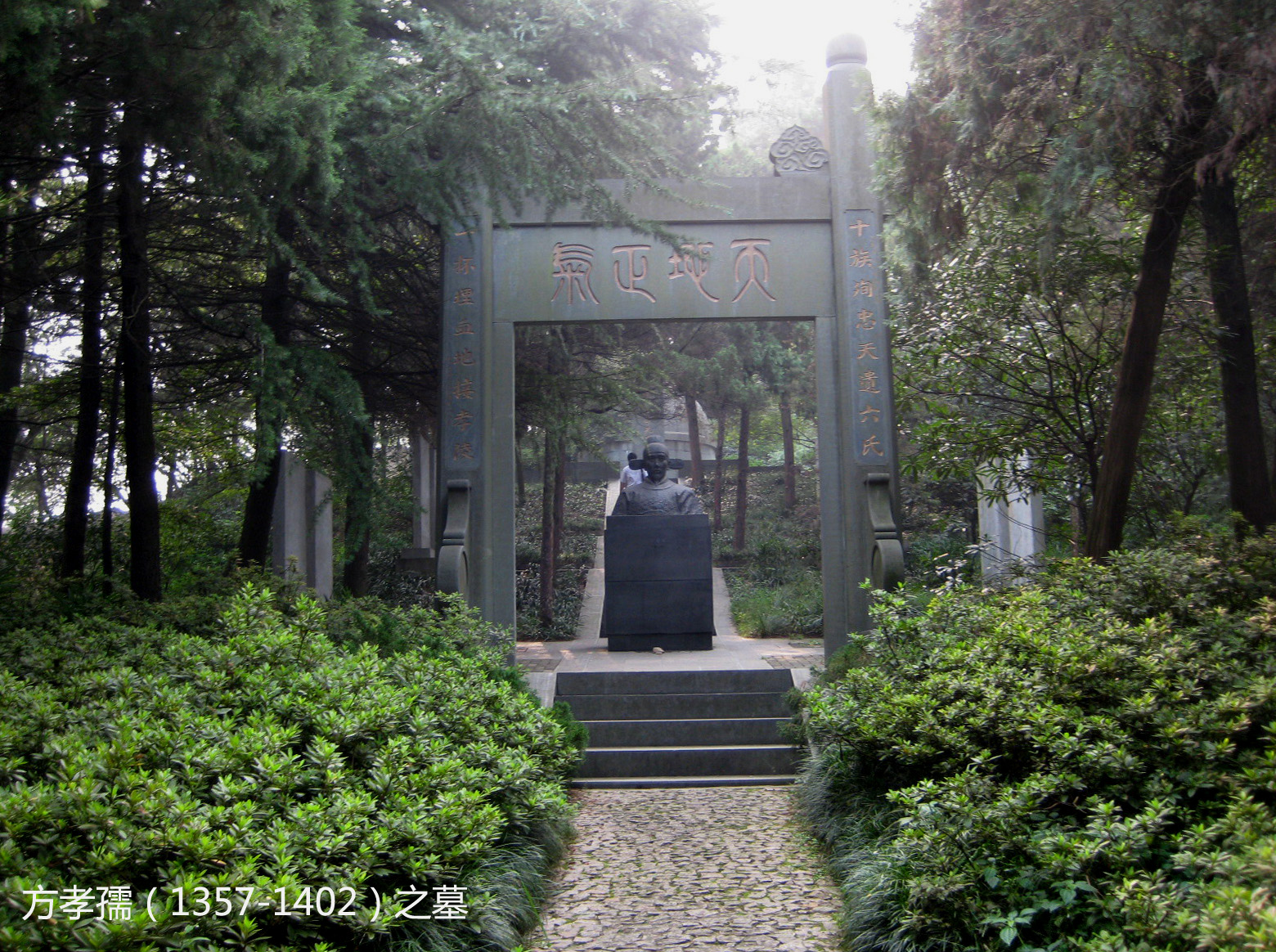

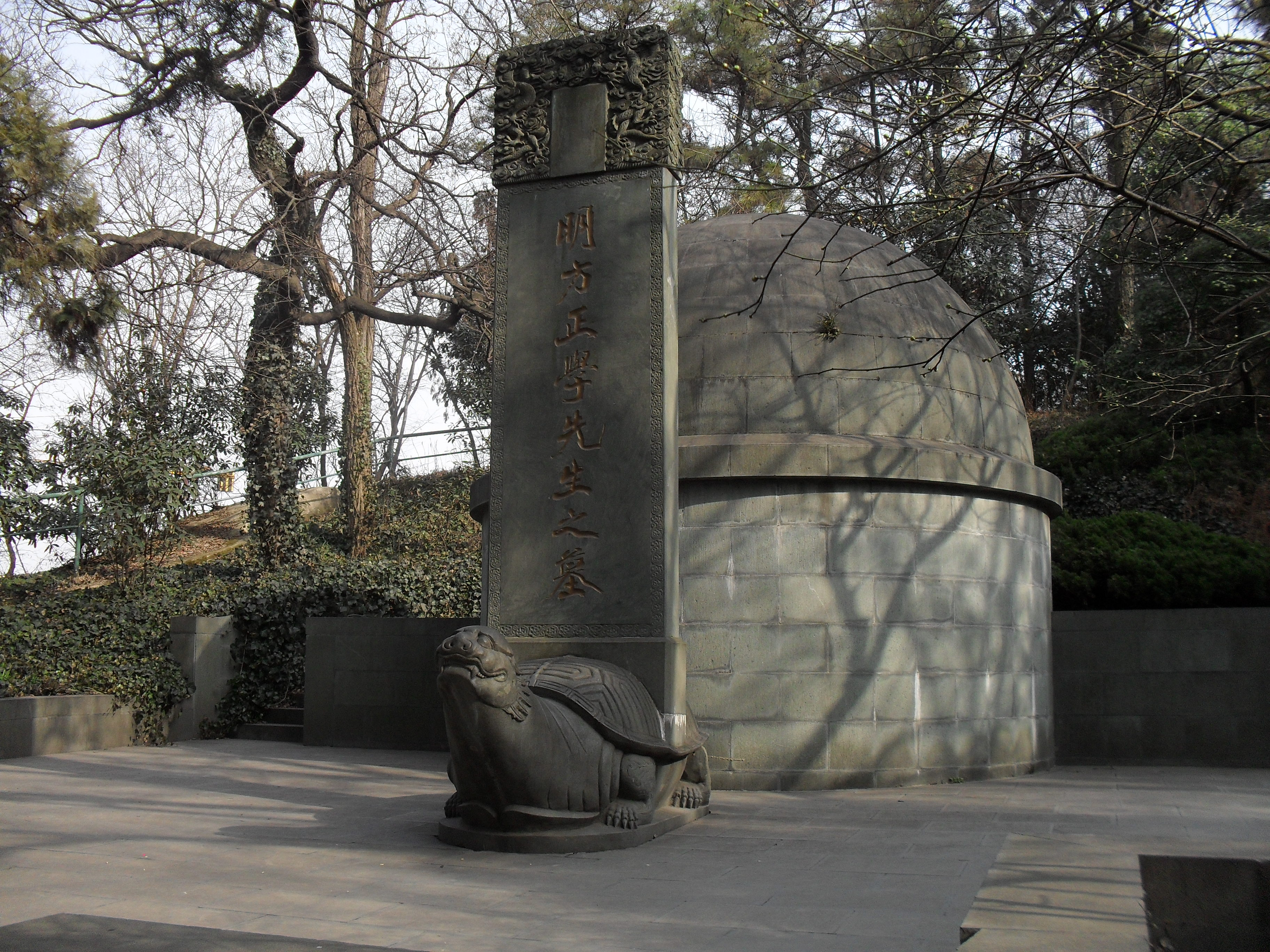

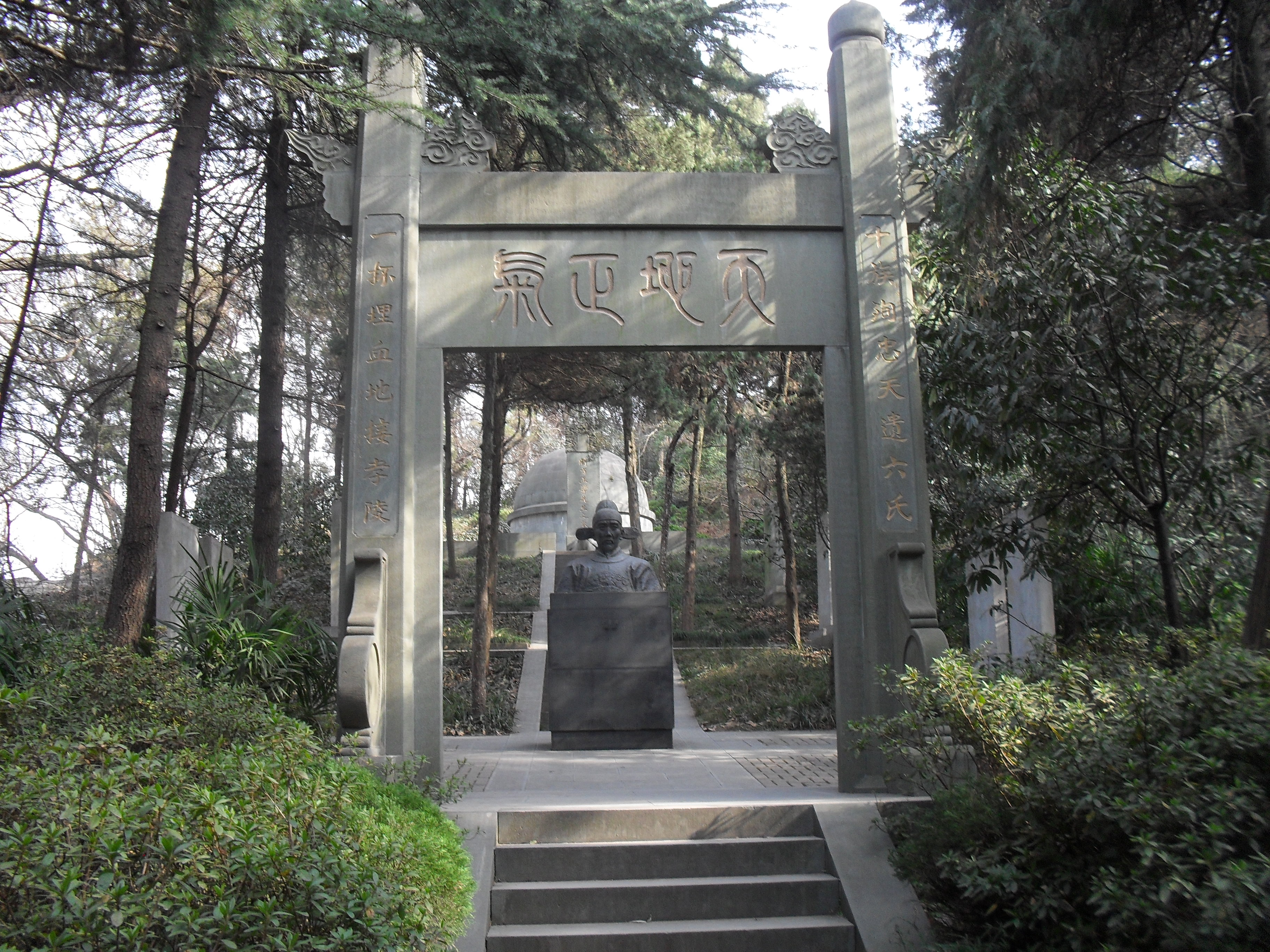

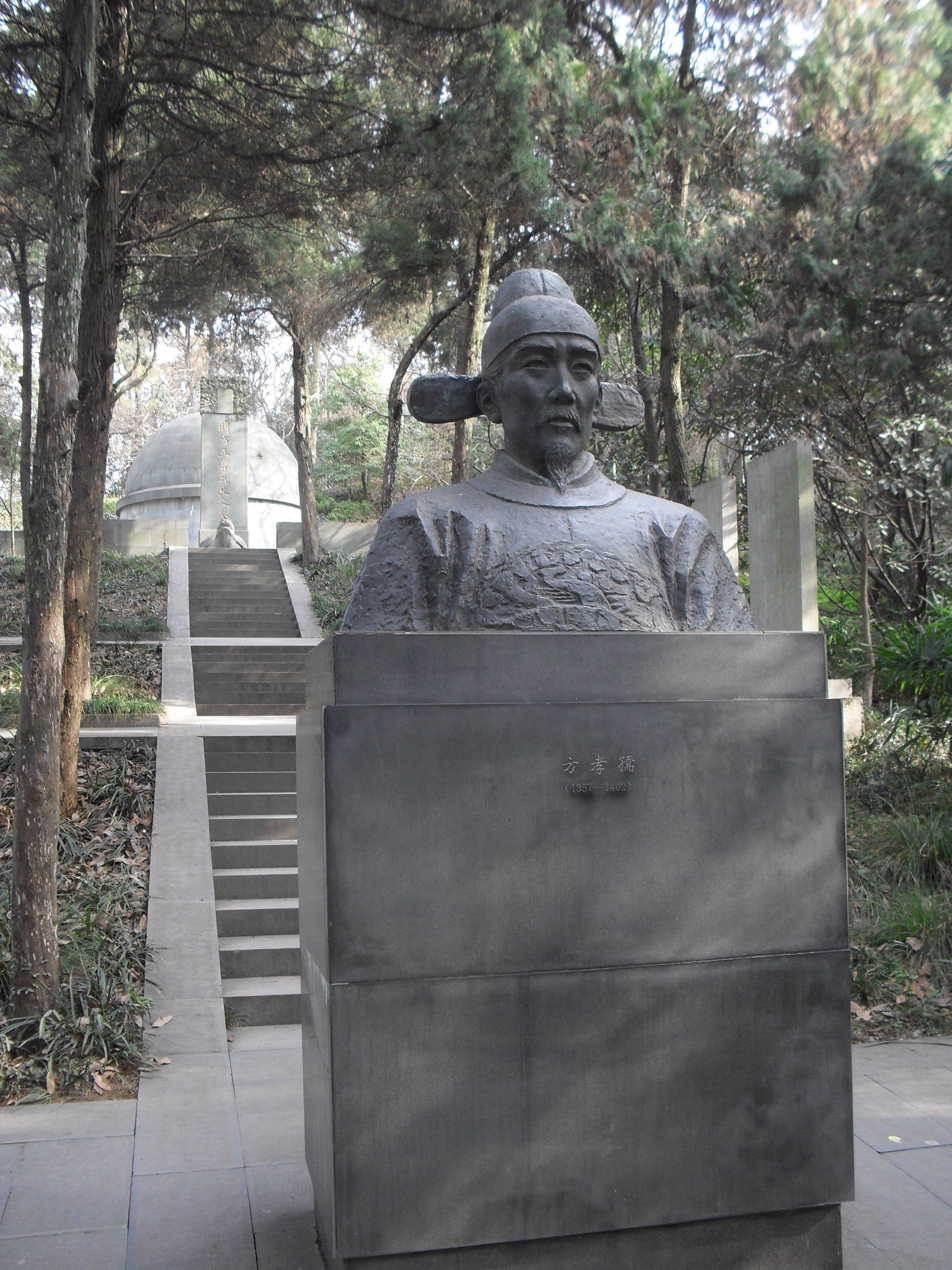
