= Hill Gates =

American anthropologist

Hill Gates is an American anthropologist specializing in China and Taiwan. She taught at Stanford University and is Professor Emerita at Central Michigan University. Her research focuses on Chinese societies, especially political economy, gender, labor, class, and family life.

== Education and academic career ==
Gates received her PhD in anthropology from the University of Michigan in 1973. She taught at Stanford University and is Professor Emerita at Central Michigan University. She also taught at Johns Hopkins University. Her academic work has remained closely tied to the anthropology of China.

== Research ==
Gates’s scholarship lies at the intersection of anthropology, Chinese studies, political economy, and gender studies. Her work has consistently focused on labor, class, livelihood, household strategies, family life, women’s work, and the historical organization of everyday economic life in Chinese society.

One major strand of her work is the ethnography of ordinary working people based on fieldwork in Taiwan. Chinese Working-Class Lives: Getting By in Taiwan examines working-class lives through life histories and historical context and explores how laboring people sustain themselves through household strategies and everyday economic practice.

A second major strand of her scholarship concerns the long-term structure of Chinese political economy. In China’s Motor: A Thousand Years of Petty Capitalism, Gates develops a broad historical argument about petty capitalism in Chinese society and its role in shaping social and economic life over the long term. According to Gates, Chinese history can be understood through the interaction of two modes of production: a tributary mode centred on the state and its extra-economic powers, and a petty-capitalist mode rooted in small producers, households, and everyday economic activity.

Gates has also written extensively on gender and women’s labor. Footbinding and Women’s Labor in Sichuan examines the relationship between footbinding, marriage, household strategy, and women’s work in pre-1949 Sichuan. She has also published more personal and reflective writing on China. Looking for Chengdu: A Woman’s Adventures in China combines travel writing, personal observation, and anthropological reflection, and explores everyday urban life through direct encounter and social observation.

Across these projects, Gates’s work is marked by sustained attention to the relationship between economy and everyday life, especially the ways gender, labor, household strategies, and class shape social reproduction in Chinese society.

== Personal life ==
Gates married anthropologist Arthur Wolf in 1990. Both taught at Stanford University.

== Selected works ==
- The Anthropology of Taiwanese Society (co-edited with Emily Martin Ahern, 1981)
- Chinese Working-Class Lives: Getting By in Taiwan (1987)
- China’s Motor: A Thousand Years of Petty Capitalism (1996)
- Looking for Chengdu: A Woman’s Adventures in China (1999)
- Footbinding and Women’s Labor in Sichuan (2014)
