= James L. Watson (anthropologist) =

American anthropologist

James L. Watson (born 6 August 1943) is Fairbank Professor of Chinese Society and Professor of Anthropology, Emeritus, Harvard University. He taught at the University of London School of Oriental and African Studies, University of Pittsburgh, University of Hawaii, and University of Houston, and, since his retirement, at Knox College. Among his interests are Chinese emigrants to London, the subject of his doctoral work and first book; ancestor worship and Chinese popular religion in present-day and in history; family life and village organization; food and food systems in East Asia. He is best known outside academia for his edited book, Golden Arches East: McDonald's in East Asia (1997, 2006).

He is married to the anthropologist Rubie S. Watson. Watson is known to friends and colleagues as "Woody."

== McDonald's in Hong Kong ==
One of James L. Watson's articles talks about how the cultural change happening in Hong Kong is a result of globalization. It is apparent that the Hong Kong natives became accustomed to American fast food values, drifting away from their local culture. The author also demonstrates how McDonald's encourages cultural integration.

James L. Watson's article on "McDonald's in Hong Kong" explains the penetration process in Hong Kong. Many believed that it would be a difficult task for McDonald's to access Hong Kong's food market. The younger generations have become accustomed to many influences outside the borders of their locality. Without compromising Hong Kong's own national identity and cultural products, McDonald's has successfully integrated American fast food chains into their everyday lives.

Before 1975, hamburgers, fries and sandwiches were presumed as snacks. McDonald's saw it as their duty to construct a franchise and positively enforce the notion that their food could be considered a full meal. Western values of fast food were not a significant cultural phenomenon in Hong Kong until the early 1980s, when young consumers slowly changed the eating habits of their elders from consuming traditional Chinese food to eating fast food.

Integrating the invention of cleanliness, which traditional restaurants did not prioritize, the McDonald's brand exceeded customers’ expectation in the 1980s. This suggests the idea that the restaurant was a catalyst to a new cleaning standard. With this new standard of cleanliness, "McDonald’s…[was] more than just a restaurant, it…[was] an oasis, a familiar rest station, in what is perceived to be an inhospitable urban environment". Overall, the company emphasized its priorities on the importance of clean facilities as one of their main qualities.

Customer characteristics are different in all societies; their demeanour, their manners, the way they present themselves and so on. In a place such as America, politeness and good manners are considered a norm, but in Hong Kong's society, friendliness, excess of congeniality, attentiveness is frowned upon and deemed suspicious, and thus it was harder to implement service with a smile in this given environment. During the training process, employees were taught how to treat customers with manners, transferring the notion of American "friendliness" over to Hong Kong citizens, as opposed to the dominant qualities for customer service that entailed directness, proficiency and composure.

Western values of consumer discipline gradually implemented into Hong Kong's society. Consumers have accepted key elements of the American fast food formula, but with localized adaptations. The establishment of an American-inspired model of customers queuing was introduced. Queue monitors were sanctioned in order to encourage the formation of orderly lines at McDonald's, which later became an in-restaurant norm by the 1980s.

Children as consumers have been noted to alter the equity of domestic power in Hong Kong homes. Through advertisements, in between their favourite television shows, children have acquired a vast array of knowledge about popular culture and popular fast food conventions. McDonald's began hosting children birthday parties, which promoted people of Hong Kong to celebrate not only their lunar birthdate, but also their Western calendrical birthdates as well.

The author concludes that "younger people…are avid consumers of transnational culture in all of its most obvious manifestations: music, fashion, television, and cuisine". From the author's view, globalization has driven cultural integration all over the world.

== Education and honors ==
Watson grew up in a small farming town in Iowa. As an undergraduate at University of Iowa he received support from the government to study Chinese, and graduated in 1965. He and his wife Ruby decided to go to Berkeley, where she finished her undergraduate degree and he took his Ph.D. University of California, Berkeley, in Anthropology in 1972.

He was president of Association for Asian Studies, Fellow of the American Academy of Arts and Sciences.

== Major works ==
- —— (1975). Emigration and the Chinese Lineage : The Mans in Hong Kong and London. Berkeley; Los Angeles; London: University of California press. ISBN 978-0-520-02647-6.
- —— (1980). Asian and African Systems of Slavery. Berkeley: University of California Press. ISBN 978-0-520-04031-1.
- —— (1986). Kinship Organization in Late Imperial China, 1000–1940. with Patricia Buckley Ebrey, eds. Berkeley: University of California Press. ISBN 978-0-520-05416-5.
- —— (1988). Death Ritual in Late Imperial and Modern China. with Evelyn Sakakida Rawski, eds. Berkeley: University of California Press. ISBN 978-0-520-91047-8.
- —— (2004). Village Life in Hong Kong: Politics, Gender, and Ritual in the New Territories. with Rubie S. Watson, eds. Hong Kong: Chinese University Press. ISBN 978-962-996-100-8.
- —— (1997). Golden Arches East: McDonald's in East Asia. Stanford, CA: Stanford University Press. ISBN 978-0-8047-3207-9. Second edition.
- —— (2005). The Cultural Politics of Food and Eating: A Reader. with Melissa L. Caldwell, eds. Malden, MA: Blackwell. ISBN 978-0-631-23092-2.
- —— (2006). Golden Arches East: McDonald's in East Asia. Stanford, Calif.: Stanford. ISBN 978-0-8047-4989-3.
