= Arthur P. Wolf =

American anthropologist specialising in China (1932–2015)

Arthur P. Wolf (March 2, 1932 – May 2, 2015) was an American anthropologist known for his research on human social organisation, kinship systems, family practices, and religion in communities influenced by Chinese cultural traditions. His work integrated ethnographic fieldwork, demographic analysis, and cultural interpretation to explore marriage, adoption, household composition, and religion. Wolf served as the David and Lucile Packard Foundation Professor in Human Biology and Professor of Anthropological Sciences at Stanford University, where he taught and conducted research for nearly five decades.

== Early life and education ==
Wolf was born on March 2, 1932, in Santa Rosa, California. He grew up in a family of ranchers and loggers and worked in logging and mining before pursuing formal higher education. He attended Santa Rosa Junior College and then received a Telluride Fellowship to study at Cornell University, where he earned a bachelor's degree in English literature and a doctorate in anthropology. Before joining Stanford University, Wolf served as an assistant professor of anthropology and psychology at Cornell University.

== Career ==
Wolf joined the Department of Anthropology at Stanford University in 1968 and taught there until his death in 2015. During his career he also lectured at the London School of Economics and Political Science in 1964 and was a visiting fellow at All Souls College, Oxford University in 1974. At Stanford, he taught courses that integrated social anthropology with demographic and biological perspectives, reflecting his interdisciplinary approach to human social life.

Wolf conducted extensive field research in communities in Taiwan, producing an extensive archive of ethnographic and demographic data on early 20th-century households, family practices, marriage systems, and adoption behavior. His work examined how cultural practices and biological factors jointly shape family systems and demographic patterns. He was the author or editor of numerous books and articles, including Sexual Attraction and Childhood Association: A Chinese Brief for Edward Westermarck, Marriage and Adoption in China, 1845-1945, and Inbreeding, Incest, and the Incest Taboo. Wolf's work has been cited in scholarly research on family systems and demographic processes in East Asian contexts, and his archives of field data continue to be used in studies of social interaction and demographic behaviour.

In addition to his work on family and kinship, Wolf made significant contributions to the anthropology of religion in Chinese contexts as the editor of Religion and Ritual in Chinese Society (Stanford University Press, 1974), a volume that brought together a range of essays on religious beliefs and practices among Chinese communities and their ritual life.

Wolf's teaching and mentorship at Stanford influenced multiple generations of students and scholars.

== Personal life ==
Wolf married anthropologist Hill Gates, another noted scholar of Taiwan and China, in 1990. Both taught at Stanford University for many years.

== Selected works ==
- Sexual Attraction and Childhood Association: A Chinese Brief for Edward Westermarck (Stanford University Press, 1995) ISBN 978-0-8047-2426-5
- Marriage and Adoption in China, 1845–1945, co-authored with Chieh-shan Huang (Stanford University Press, 1980) ISBN 978-0-8047-1027-5
- Inbreeding, Incest, and the Incest Taboo: The State of Knowledge at the Turn of the Century, edited with William H. Durham (Stanford University Press, 2005) ISBN 978-0-8047-5141-4
- Religion and Ritual in Chinese Society (editor; Stanford University Press, 1974)
