= Jing Qing =

Ming official who attempted to assassinate the Yongle Emperor

- 景清
- Born: Zhenning
- Died: 1402; Nanjing (presumed)
- Cause of death: Execution by flaying
- Occupations: Court official, councilor
- Known for: Attempted assassination of the Yongle Emperor
- Office: Censor-in-chief
- Term: Jianwen era

Jing Qing (Chinese: 景清) was a councilor during the early Ming dynasty who had attempted to assassinate the Yongle Emperor.

== Early life ==
Jing Qing was born in Zhenning and was said to be from a lower-class family, his nickname during his youth was said to be "耿" referring to his intelligent nature. He was said to have placed second during the imperial examinations of 1394. He had held the position of the censor in chief during the Jianwen era and had previously been a court compiler.

== Assassination attempt ==
On an occasion where he had chosen to hold court, Jing Qing had arrived wearing a red gown. The Emperor had been suspicious and had been warned by an astrologer about a red star that had planned to take the emperors seat. After closer inspection and a search, he discovered that Jing Qing had been hiding a blade and had been planning to assassinate him. When questioned about his intentions, Jing Qing condemned Zhu Di, whereupon he struck a blow at his teeth, whereafter Jing Qing would resist and spit the blood back towards the Emperor.

After this act of defiance, the emperor had Jing Qing flayed alive, his death taking place that day in 1402, and he proceeded to eliminate Jing Qing's entire clan. His hometown had been put under suspicion and his former friends and confidants had become a victim of tyranny. This event would be referred to under the chengyu "瓜蔓抄" or the Gourd-Vine search, and it would lead to the ruination of multiple residences and villages.

== Legacy ==
Jing Qing would be revered as a deity along with Tie Xuan and Fang Xiaoru as among the Sanwang within Chinese folk religion and he would be regarded as a martyr in unofficial Ming biographies.

== See also ==
- Lingchi
- Fang Xiaoru
- Jianwen Emperor
- Yongle Emperor
