= Naxi =

Naxi may refer to:

- Naxi people (納西族), an ethnic group mainly living in southwest provinces of China
- Naxi language (納西語), the Sino-Tibetan language of the Naxi people
- Naxi District (納溪區), Luzhou, Sichuan
- Naxi script, script(s) used to write the Naxi language
