= Polly Low =

Classical scholar and ancient historian

- Occupations: Classicist, historian, epigrapher

Academic background
- Education: University of Oxford (BA); University of Cambridge (PhD, 2002)
- Thesis: Normative politics in Greek interstate relations, 411-322 BC (2002)

Academic work
- Discipline: Ancient history
- Sub-discipline: Ancient Greek epigraphy
- Institutions: Durham University

Polly Alexandra Low is a classical scholar and ancient historian. She is Professor of Ancient History at Durham University, and was previously a professor at the University of Manchester. Her research focuses on the political history of the Classical Greek World, and in the history and ideology of Greek interstate relations.

== Academic career ==
Polly Low received a Bachelor of Arts from the University of Oxford, followed by a Doctor of Philosophy from the University of Cambridge in 2002. Her thesis was titled "Normative politics in Greek interstate relations, 411-322 BC". Following her PhD, she was elected as the W.H.D. Rouse Fellow in Classics at Christ's College, Cambridge.

In 2017, Low was a visiting member of the Institute for Advanced Study, Princeton.

Low has published multiple books on Greek history and epigraphy, including Interstate Relations in Classical Greece: Morality and Power (2007), Inscriptions and their Uses in Greek and Latin Literature (2013, with Peter Liddel) and The Cambridge Companion to Thucydides (2023).

== Digital outreach work ==
Low is one of the editors of Attic Inscriptions Online, a resource structured around annotated translations of Athenian inscriptions. It contains around 3,000 entries and is widely used by researchers, educators, museums, students, and the general public.

== Books ==
=== As author ===
- Low, Polly (2007). Interstate Relations in Classical Greece: Morality and Power. Cambridge University Press.

=== As editor ===
- Low, Polly, ed. (2008). The Athenian Empire. Edinburgh University Press.
- Low, Polly; Oliver, Graham; Rhodes, P. J., eds. (2012). Cultures of Commemoration: War Memorials, Ancient and Modern. Oxford University Press.
- Liddel, Peter; Low, Polly, eds. (2013). Inscriptions and their Uses in Greek and Latin Literature. Oxford University Press. doi:10.1093/acprof:oso/9780199665747.001.0001. ISBN 978-0-19-966574-7.
- Low, Polly, ed. (2023). The Cambridge Companion to Thucydides. Cambridge University Press. doi:10.1017/9781316227442. ISBN 978-1-316-22744-2.
