= List of Relic of an Emissary characters =

Promotional poster. From left to right: Chu Kuen, Tsui Yee-wah, Ma Yan-wai, Ma Sam-po, Shum Chin-sam, Chu Tai, Ngo Siu-fung, Chu Ying, Chu Wan-man, Yim Chun, Fu Siu-kiu, Lee King-lung.

Relic of an Emissary is a television historical fiction drama produced by TVB. Some of the characters' names listed below are in Cantonese romanisation.

== Ming Dynasty ==
Cast	Role	Description
Law Lok-lam	Chu Yuen-cheung 朱元璋	Founder and the first emperor of Ming Dynasty; Consort Ong and Princess Yeung Suk's husband Chu Kong, Chu Tai, Chu Sau, Chu Pok, Chu Chun, Chu Pak, Chu Kwai, Chu Chik, Chu Kuen, Chu Pin, Chu Wai and Chu Ying's father Chu Wan-man's grandfather Died in Episode 3
Mary Hon	Consort Ong 瓮妃	Suffered from madness Chu Yuen-cheung's abandoned wife Chu Tai's mother To Hin's ex-girlfriend Killed by a killer ordered by To Hin in Episode 25
Poon Fong-fong	Consort Yeung Suk 楊淑妃	Chu Yuen-cheung's wife Chu Kuen's mother Killed by Chu Kuen in Episode 6
Joel Chan	Chu Wan-man 朱允炆	Age 20; The second emperor of Ming Dynasty; Chu Yuen-cheung's grandson Chu Kong, Chu Tai, Chu Sau, Chu Pok, Chu Chun, Chu Pak, Chu Kwai, Chu Chik, Chu Kuen, Chu Pin and Chu Wai and Chu Ying's nephew Ma Yan-wai's husband Lok Yuen-ting's ex-boyfriend Overthrown by Chu Tai; Overthrown by Chu Tai and fled away from the capital in Episode 30 (Semi-villain)
Leung Ka-ki	Ma Yan-wai 馬恩慧	Age 22; Empress Ma; Chu Wan-man's wife Geng Ping-man's niece Framed Luk Yuen-ting; Died in a fire of the palace in Episode 30 (Semi-villain)
Eddie Li	Chu Kong 朱棡	Prince of Chun; Chu Yuen-cheung's third son Chu Tai, Chu Sau, Chu Pok, Chu Chun, Chu Pak, Chu Kwai, Chu Chik, Chu Kuen, Chu Pin, Chu Wai and Chu Yings's older brother Chu Wan-man's uncle Killed by Chu Kuen and Ngai Chun in Episode 2
Joe Ma	Chu Tai 朱棣	Age 30; Prince of Yin, later the third emperor of Ming Dynasty; Chu Yuen-cheung's fourth son Consort Ong's son Chu Kong's younger brother Chu Sau, Chu Pok, Chu Chun, Chu Pak, Chu Kwai, Chu Chik, Chu Kuen, Chu Pin, Chu Wai and Chu Yings's older brother Chu Wan-man's uncle Chui Yee-wah's husband Chui Fai-cho's brother-in-law Sham Chin-sam's lover Overthrew Chu Wan-man to be the emperor (Semi-villain)
Skye Chan	Chui Yee-wah 徐儀華	Age 30; Empress Xu; Chu Tai's wife Chui Fai-cho's younger sister
Kate Tsui	Chor Chor 楚楚	Chu Tai's wife Sham Chin-sam's younger twin sister
Deno Cheung	Chu Sau 朱橚	Prince of Chow; Chu Yuan-cheung's fifth son Chu Kong and Chu Tai's younger brother Chu Pok, Chu Chun, Chu Pak, Chu Kwai, Chu Chik, Chu Kuen, Chu Pin, Chu Wai and Chu Ying's older brother Chu Wan-man's uncle
Ho Hing-fai	Chu Pok 朱榑	Prince of Chai; Chu Yuan-cheung's seventh son Chu Kong, Chu Tai and Chu Sau's younger brother Chu Chun, Chu Pak, Chu Kwai, Chu Chik, Chu Kuen, Chu Pin, Chu Wai and Chu Ying's older brother Chu Wan-man's uncle Degraded to a civilian by Chu Wan-man in Episode 24; Returned to the Prince identity in Episode 30
Vincent Wan	Chu Chun 朱椿	Prince of Suk; Chu Yuan-cheung's eleventh son Chu Kong, Chu Tai, Chu Sau and Chu Pok's younger brother Chu Pak, Chu Kwai, Chu Chik, Chu Kuen, Chu Pin, Chu Wai and Chu Ying's older brother Chu Wan-man's uncle
Dexter Young	Chu Pak 朱柏	Prince of Seung; Chu Yuan-cheung's twelfth son Chu Kong, Chu Tai, Chu Sau, Chu Pok and Chu Chun's younger brother Chu Kwai, Chu Chik, Chu Kuen, Chu Pin, Chu Wai and Chu Ying's older brother Chu Wan-man's uncle Committed suicide after being prosecuted of printing fake banknotes in Episode 13
Lee Ho	Chu Kwai 朱桂	Prince of Toi; Chu Yuan-cheung's thirteenth son Chu Kong, Chu Tai, Chu Sau, Chu Pok, Chu Chun and Chu Pak's younger brother Chu Chik, Chu Kuen, Chu Pin, Chu Wai and Chu Ying's older brother Chu Wan-man's uncle Degraded to a civilian by Chu Wan-man in Episode 24; Returned to the King identity in Episode 30
Tse Cheuk-yin	Chu Chik 朱植	Prince of Liu; Chu Yuan-cheung's fifteenth son Chu Kong, Chu Tai, Chu Sau, Chu Pok, Chu Chun, Chu Pak and Chu Kwai's younger brother Chu Kuen, Chu Pin, Chu Wai and Chu Ying's older brother Chu Wan-man's uncle
Ruco Chan	Chu Kuen 朱權	Prince of Ning; Chu Yuen-cheung's seventeenth son Consort Yeung Suk's son Chu Kong, Chu Tai, Chu Sau, Chu Pok, Chu Chun, Chu Pak, Chu Kwai and Chu Chik's younger brother Chu Pin, Chu Wai and Chu Ying's older brother Chu Wan-man's uncle Colluded with Ngai Chun; Killed Chu Kong and Consort Yeung Suk; Army deprived by Chu Tai in Episode 27 (Villain)
Cheung Wing-hong	Chu Pin 朱楩	Prince of Man; Chu Yuen-cheung's eighteenth son Chu Kong, Chu Tai, Chu Sau, Chu Pok, Chu Chun, Chu Pak, Chu Kwai, Chu Chik and Chu Kuen's younger brother Chu Wai and Chu Ying's older brother Chu Wan-man's uncle
Joey Law	Chu Wai 朱橞	Prince of Kuk; Chu Yuen-cheung's nineteenth son Chu Kong, Chu Tai, Chu Sau, Chu Pok, Chu Chun, Chu Pak, Chu Kwai, Chu Chik, Chu Kuen and Chu Pin's younger brother Chu Ying's older brother Chu Wan-man's uncle
Elanne Kong	Chu Ying 朱櫻	Age 20; Princess Wing-yeung; Chu Yuen-cheung's youngest daughter Chu Kong, Chu Tai, Chu Sau, Chu Pok, Chu Chun, Chu Pak, Chu Kwai, Chu Chik, Chu Kuen, Chu Pin and Chu Wai's younger sister Chu Wan-man's aunt Lee King-lung's love interest, later his wife, but finally broke up Loved Ngo Siu-fung, later became his wife and moved out to a farm and have 2 children Ma Sam-po's love interest

== Brocade Guards ==
Cast	Role	Description
Gordon Liu	Yim Chun 嚴進	Age 40; A Brocade Guard leader Ngai Chun's superior Used Chor Chor; Killed Sham Chin-sam in Episode 20; Fired by Chu Wan-man in Episode 21; Committed suicide in Episode 30 (Semi-villain)
Michael Tse	Ngo Siu-fung 敖笑風	Age 30; A Brocade Guard, promoted to leader by Chu Wan-man in episode 21; Ngai Chun's subordinate Lau Chung-leung, Ching Wai, Sham Chin-sam and Kwok Ting's superior Chu Ying and Chor Chor's love interest, later became Chu Ying's husband and moved out to a farm and have 2 children Fu Siu-kiu's love interest, later her husband Promoted to Brocade Guard leader in Episode 21; Chopped left arm himself to apologize to Chu Wan-man in Episode 29 (Semi-villain)
Au Sui-wai	Ngai Chun 魏鎮	A Brocade Guard; Yim Chun's subordinate Ngo Siu-fung's superior Framed Ngo Siu-fung; Colluded with Chu Kuen; Killed Chu Kong; Committed suicide after being revealed of killing Chu Kong in Episode 15 (Villain)
Fred Cheng	Lau Chung-leung 劉忠良	A Brocade Guard; Ngo Siu-fung's subordinate Loved Fu Siu-kiu; Tim Yee's husband
Lam King-kong	Kwok Ting 郭定	A Brocade Guard; Suffered from venereal disease Ngo Siu-fung's subordinate Raped Fu Siu-kiu in Episode 16; Killed by Fu Siu-kiu in Episode 17 (Villain)
Hugo Wong	Ching Wai 程偉	A Brocade Guard; Ngo Siu-fung's subordinate
Kate Tsui	Sham Chin-sam 沈千三	Age 20; A Brocade Guard instructed by Yim Chun; A brothel (Hing Yin Tsui Lau) owner Ngo Siu-fung's subordinate Chor-chor's older twin sister Chu Tai's mistress, but betrayed by him Killed by Yim Chun in Episode 20 (Semi-villain)
Daniel Kwok	Chan Do 陳都	A Brocade Guard; Killed by Chu Leng in Episode 18
Sire Ma	Fu Siu-kiu 傅小喬	Age 20; A Brocade Guard slave girl Loved Ngo Siu-fung, later his wife Lau Chung-leung's love interest Raped by Kwok Ting in Episode 16; Killed Kwok Ting in Episode 17; Died of the falling rubbles of Ngo Siu-fung's house in Episode 29

== Chu Wan-man's courtiers ==
Cast	Role	Description
Felix Lok	Kang Ping-man 耿炳文	The Great General; Ma Yan-wai's uncle Committed suicide in Episode 30
Savio Tsang	Chui Fai-cho 徐輝祖	A Prince Grand Tutor; Chui Yee-wah's older brother Chu Tai's brother-in-law Housed arrested by Chu Dai and later died in Episode 30
Benjamin Yuen	Lee King-lung 李景隆	Age 30; Cao State Courtier and Left Army Field Marshal; Loved Chu Ying, later husband, but finally broke up Ngo Siu-fung's love rival Defected to Chu Tai in Episode 30
Carlo Ng	Wong Chi-ching 黃子澄	A Confucian tutor A chief plotter of stripping Chu Tai's power Executed by Chu Tai in Episode 30
Wilson Tsui	Fong Hau-yu 方孝孺	A Confucian scholar A chief plotter of stripping Chu Tai's power Executed by Chu Tai in Episode 30
Dickson Lee	Chai Tai 齊泰	An Army Bureau official A chief plotter of stripping Chu Tai's power Executed by Chu Tai in Episode 30

== Chu Tai's courtiers ==
Cast	Role	Description
Lau Kong	To Hin 道衍	A monk Chu Tai's counselor Consort Ong's ex-lover
Sammul Chan	Ma Sam-po 馬三保	Age 27; Chu Tai's guard and eunuch Loved Chu Ying; Sharen Gaowa's love interest Assigned by Chu Tai to explore the Ocean Sea in Episode 30
Wong Ching	Chu Leng 朱能	Chu Tai's minister Killed Chan Do in Episode 18
Yeung Ying-wai	Cheung Yuk 張玉	Chu Tai's minister Died in a war in Episode 30
Leung Kin-ping	Kot Shing 葛誠	A Confucian scholar A chief plotter of stripping Chu Tai's power Executed by Chu Tai (Villain)
Angel Chiang	Siu Lai 小麗	Chu Yee-wah's guard
Grace Wong	Chuk Yim-yim	Chu Tai's secret agent, Ngo Siu Fung's childhood friend

== Hing Yin Tsui Lau Brothel ==
Cast	Role	Description
Kate Tsui	Sham Chin-sam 沈千三	The brothel owner Chor Chor's older twin sister Chu Tai's mistress, but betrayed by him Killed by Yim Chun in Episode 20 (Semi-villain)
Kate Tsui	Chor Chor 楚楚	Sham Chin-sam's younger twin sister Chu Tai's wife Loved Ngo Siu-fung; Used by Yim Chun
Yoyo Chen	Lok Yuen-Ting 陸宛莛	Age 19; A song girl Chu Wai-man's ex-girlfriend Committed suicide incited by Ma Yan-wai in Episode 10
Jess Shum	Yik Suet 亦雪	A song girl Ngo Siu-fung's ex-lover

== Others ==
Cast	Role	Description
Macy Chan	Sharen Gaowa 薩仁高娃	Age 20; A Mongolian; Loved Ma Sam-po
Charmaine Li	Tim Yee 甜兒	Chu Ying's maid Lau Chung-leung's wife

== See also ==
- Relic of an Emissary
