= 1400 =

Calendar year in the 2nd millennium

1400 in various calendars
- Gregorian calendar: 1400; MCD
- Ab urbe condita: 2153
- Armenian calendar: 849; ԹՎ ՊԽԹ
- Assyrian calendar: 6150
- Balinese saka calendar: 1321–1322
- Bengali calendar: 806–807
- Berber calendar: 2350
- English Regnal year: 1 Hen. 4 – 2 Hen. 4
- Buddhist calendar: 1944
- Burmese calendar: 762
- Byzantine calendar: 6908–6909
- Chinese calendar: 己卯年 (Earth Rabbit); 4097 or 3890 — to — 庚辰年 (Metal Dragon); 4098 or 3891
- Coptic calendar: 1116–1117
- Discordian calendar: 2566
- Ethiopian calendar: 1392–1393
- Hebrew calendar: 5160–5161
- Hindu calendars
- Vikram Samvat: 1456–1457
- Shaka Samvat: 1321–1322
- Kali Yuga: 4500–4501
- Holocene calendar: 11400
- Igbo calendar: 400–401
- Iranian calendar: 778–779
- Islamic calendar: 802–803
- Japanese calendar: Ōei 7 (応永７年)
- Javanese calendar: 1314–1315
- Julian calendar: 1400; MCD
- Korean calendar: 3733
- Minguo calendar: 512 before ROC 民前512年
- Nanakshahi calendar: −68
- Thai solar calendar: 1942–1943
- Tibetan calendar: ས་མོ་ཡོས་ལོ་ (female Earth-Hare); 1526 or 1145 or 373 — to — ལྕགས་ཕོ་འབྲུག་ལོ་ (male Iron-Dragon); 1527 or 1146 or 374

Year 1400 (MCD) was a leap year starting on Thursday of the Julian calendar. The year 1400 was not a leap year in the Proleptic Gregorian calendar. It was a common year starting on Wednesday.

== Events ==
=== January–March ===
- January 4 – The Epiphany Rising begins in England against King Henry IV by nobles planning to restore King Richard II to the throne, and is quickly crushed. Baron Lumley dies after attempting to seize Cirencester. The Earl of Salisbury and the Earl of Kent are captured and beheaded on January 7. Sir Thomas Blount is hanged, drawn and quartered at Oxford on January 12. Thomas le Despenser, 1st Earl of Gloucester is captured and executed by a mob in Bristol on January 13. The Earl of Huntingdon is beheaded at Pleshey on January 16.
- February 14 – The deposed Richard II of England dies by means unknown in Pontefract Castle. It is likely that King Henry IV ordered his death by starvation, to prevent further uprisings.
- February – Henry Percy (Hotspur) leads English incursions into Scotland.
- March 23 – Five-year-old Trần Thiếu Đế is forced to abdicate as ruler of Đại Việt (modern-day Vietnam), in favour of his maternal grandfather and court official Hồ Quý Ly, ending the Trần dynasty after 175 years and starting the Hồ dynasty. Hồ Quý Ly subsequently changes the country's name to Đại Ngu.

=== April–June ===
- April 21 – Sir Thomas Percy, 1st Earl of Worcester, resigns as England's Admiral of the North and West to join the resistance against King Henry IV. The office will remain vacant for more than six years. Percy will be beheaded in 1403 after his defeat in the Battle of Shrewsbury.
- April 23 – In what is now Romania, Alexandru cel Bun (Alexander the Good) is installed as the new Prince (Voivode) of Moldavia by Mircea the Elder, the Voivode of Wallachia, after Mircea removes the reigning monarch, Prince Iuga.
- April 25 – Jingnan campaign: In the Shandong province of Ming dynasty China, Zhu Di, Prince of Yan, defeats the Imperial forces of General Li Jinglong in the two-day Battle of Baigou River, by taking advantage of the chaos that results when a gust of wind breaks the staff of General Li's flag of battle. The Yan forces capture 100,000 of the Imperial soldiers as prisoners and Li and the others retreat to Jinan.
- April – King Swa Saw Ke, of Ava, the largest kingdom in Burma, dies after a reign of 33 years and is succeeded by his son, King Tarabya, who reigns less than seven months before being assassinated.
- May 22 – Meeting in Frankfurt, three of the prince-electors of the Holy Roman Empire (Rupert, elector of the Palatinate, Rudolf III, Duke of Saxe-Wittenberg, elector of Saxony, and Jobst of Moravia, elector of Brandenburg) meet in an attempt to replace the Emperor, Wenceslaus, King of the Romans because of his failure to stamp out civil unrest or to resolve the Western Schism. They select Frederick I, Duke of Brunswick-Lüneburg as the replacement for Wenceslaus.
- June 5 – Duke Frederick I of Brunswick-Lüneburg is assassinated after being identified as a rival to Wenceslaus, Holy Roman Emperor. Frederick, on his way back from a May 22 meeting of the prince-electors, is ambushed by a party of men led by Count Henry of Waldeck while passing through the village of Kleinenglis in the Principality of Waldeck and Pyrmont (now part of the German state of Hesse, near Borken).

=== July–September ===
- July 7 – Sir John Swinton, an envoy of King Robert III of Scotland, crosses the border into England along with 20 knights, after being given a writ of safe conduct by King Henry IV to allow their travel to negotiate during the standoff between the two British kingdoms between phases of the Hundred Years' War.
- July 26 – Jagiellonian University is re-established in Kraków by order of King Władysław II, with the creation of the Faculty of Theology at what is then called the Kraków Academy. The restoration is partially financed by the sale of jewelry owned by the King's late wife, Queen Jadwiga, who had died in 1399.
- August 6 – Writing from Newcastle upon Tyne to Scotland's King Robert III, England's King Henry IV sends a demand that King Robert meet him "on Monday the 23rd of this present month of August, at Edinburgh, where, for this reason and for the peace of tranquility of the realms of England and Scotland, we intend to be," for Robert "to perform the obligation which you owe us" as "overlords of Scotland and of its kings in all temporal matters pertaining to them..." King Henry warns that "considering the effusion of Christian blood and other dangers and losses which may occur if you do not comply with our wishes, you will be present to render us homage and take the oath of fealty."
- August 14 – King Henry IV leads the English Army into Scotland, after receiving no answer from Scotland's King Robert III to his August 6 demand. The troops reach Haddington, East Lothian the next day and at Leith, on the outskirts of Edinburgh, by August 18. As historian James Hamilton Wylie will note almost 500 years later, "the walls of Edinburgh did not fall before this ram's-horn blast, and August 23rd came and went without the required homage or recognition."
- August 20 – Meeting at the Lahneck Castle in what is now the German state Rhineland-Palatinate, the princes of the German states vote to depose the Holy Roman Emperor, Wenceslaus, due to his weak leadership and mental illnesses.
- August 21 – Rupert, Count Palatine of the Rhine, is elected as King of the Romans.
- August 29 – Having failed in his expedition to receive a pledge of fealty from the King of Scotland, King Henry IV crosses back into England.
- September 16 – Owain Glyndŵr is proclaimed Prince of Wales by his followers, and begins attacking English strongholds in northeast Wales.

=== October–December ===
- October 7 – Tamerlane, the Mongol conqueror, stops between Malatya and Aleppo at the Turkish garrison in Behesna. According to author Peter Purton, the garrison "had the temerity to shoot a catapult ball at Timur which rolled into his tent. Setting up his own battery of 20 machines, it is said that the first shot hit and destroyed the offending weapon. Treating this as a good omen, the attack was launched, the towers mined... and the place surrendered."
- October 29 – Jingnan campaign: In China, Prince Zhu Di of Yan expands his conquests with the capture of Cangzhou in Heibei province.
- October 30 – (11 Rabi' I 803 AH) Tamerlane begins the destruction of the Syrian city of Aleppo overwhelming the Mamluk Sultanate defenders.
- November 2 – The Mamluk Sultanate surrenders the city of Aleppo and Tamerlane's Army massacres many of the inhabitants.
- November 25 – (9th waxing of Nadaw, 730 ME) Minkhaung I becomes the new King of Ava, the largest kingdom in what is now northern Myanmar, after a battle for power that follows the assassination of the erratic King Tarabya.
- December 21 – Manuel II Palaiologos becomes the only Byzantine Emperor ever to visit England, and is greeted at Blackheath by King Henry IV, who hosts the Emperor at Eltham Palace during the Christmas holiday.
- December 25 – In China, the Jingnan campaign of Prince Zhu Di of Yan suffers a serious reversal at the Battle of Dongchang as Imperial General Sheng Yong, replacement of Li Jinglong, encircles the Yan forces. Yan Army General Zhang Yu is killed, but Zhu Di is able to escape to the northern capital at Beijing and regroups his forces for a second attack to take place in February.

=== Date unknown ===
- Timur defeats both the Ottoman Empire and the Mamluk Sultanate of Egypt, to capture the city of Damascus in present-day Syria. Much of the city's inhabitants are subsequently massacred by Timur's troops.
- Timur conquers the Empire of The Black Sheep Turkomans, in present-day Azerbaijan, and the Jalayirid dynasty in present-day Iraq. Black Sheep ruler Qara Yusuf and Jalayirid Sultan Ahmad flee, and take refuge with the Ottoman Sultan Bayezid I.
- In modern-day Korea, King Jeongjong of Joseon abdicates in fear of an attack by his ambitious younger brother, Taejong. Taejong succeeds to the throne.
- Prince Parameswara establishes the Malacca Sultanate, in present-day western Malaysia and northern Sumatra.
- Hananchi succeeds Min as King of Hokuzan, in modern-day north Okinawa, Japan.
- Wallachia (modern-day southern Romania) resists an invasion by the Ottomans.
- A Wallachian army captures Iuga, and makes Alexandru cel Bun the Prince of Moldavia.
- The Kingdom of Kongo begins.
- The Haast's eagle and Moa are both driven to extinction by Māori hunters.
- The Mississippian culture starts to decline.
- Europe is reported to have around 52 million inhabitants.
- The House of Medici becomes powerful in Florence.
- Newcastle upon Tyne is created a county corporate, by Henry IV of England.
- Jean Froissart completes his Chronicles, detailing the events of the 14th Century in France.

== Births ==
- January 13 – Infante John of Portugal, the Constable (d. 1442)
- March 15 – Guillaume Jouvenel des Ursins, Justice Minister of France (d. 1472)
- May 19 – John Stourton, 1st Baron Stourton, English baron (d. 1462)
- June 14 – Joan Ramon II, Count of Cardona (d. 1471)
- July 26 – Isabel le Despenser, Countess of Worcester, English noble (d. 1439)
- October 24 – Mani' ibn Rabi'a al-Muraydi, oldest known ancestor of the House of Al Sa'ud (d. 1463)
- December 25 – John Sutton, 1st Baron Dudley, Lord Lieutenant of Ireland (d. 1487)
- date unknown
  - James Tuchet, 5th Baron Audley (d. 1459)
  - Luca della Robbia, Florentine sculptor (d. 1482)
  - Isabella, Duchess of Lorraine (d. 1453).
  - James of Sclavonia, Croatian friar (d. April 1485 or 1496)
  - Gennadius Scholarius, Byzantine Greek philosopher and theologian, and Ecumenical Patriarch of Constantinople (d. 1473)
  - Richard Neville, 5th Earl of Salisbury, English politician (d. 1460)
  - Owen Tudor, Welsh courtier (d. 1461)
  - Jacopo Bellini, Italian painter (d. 1470)
  - Rogier van der Weyden, Dutch painter (or 1399)
  - Hans Multscher, German painter and sculptor (d. 1467)
  - Helene Kottanner, Hungarian writer and courtier (d. after 1470)
  - Ausiàs March, medieval Valencian poet and knight (d. 1459)
  - Henry, Duke of Villena (d. 1445)
  - Gonçalo Velho Cabral, Portuguese monk, Commander in the Order of Christ, explorer, and hereditary landowner (d. 1460)
  - Manuel Fokas, Greek Byzantine painter (d. after 1454)
  - Gilles Binchois, Franco-Flemish composer (d. 1460)
  - Hang Jebat, closest companion of the legendary Malaccan hero Hang Tuah
  - Alexander of Masovia, Polish prince member of the House of Piast and Bishop of Trento (d. 1444)
  - Andrea Grego, Dominican friar and preacher (d. 1485)
  - Andronikos V Palaiologos, Byzantine ruler of Thessalonica and surrounding territories alongside his father John VII Palaiologos (d. 1407)
  - Thomas Boleyn, Master of Gonville Hall, Cambridge and English priest (d. 1472)
  - Vettore Cappello, merchant, statesman and military commander of the Republic of Venice (d. 1467)
  - Domenico Capranica, Italian theologian, canonist, statesman, and cardinal (d. 1458)
  - Pietru Caxaro, Maltese philosopher and poet (d. 1485)
  - Eleanor, Duchess of Gloucester noblewoman, first the mistress and then the second wife of Humphrey, Duke of Gloucester (d. 1452)
- probable
  - Marina Nani, Venetian dogaressa (d. 1473)
  - Giovanna Dandolo, Venetian dogaressa (d. after 1462)
  - Johannes Gutenberg (d. 1468)

== Deaths ==
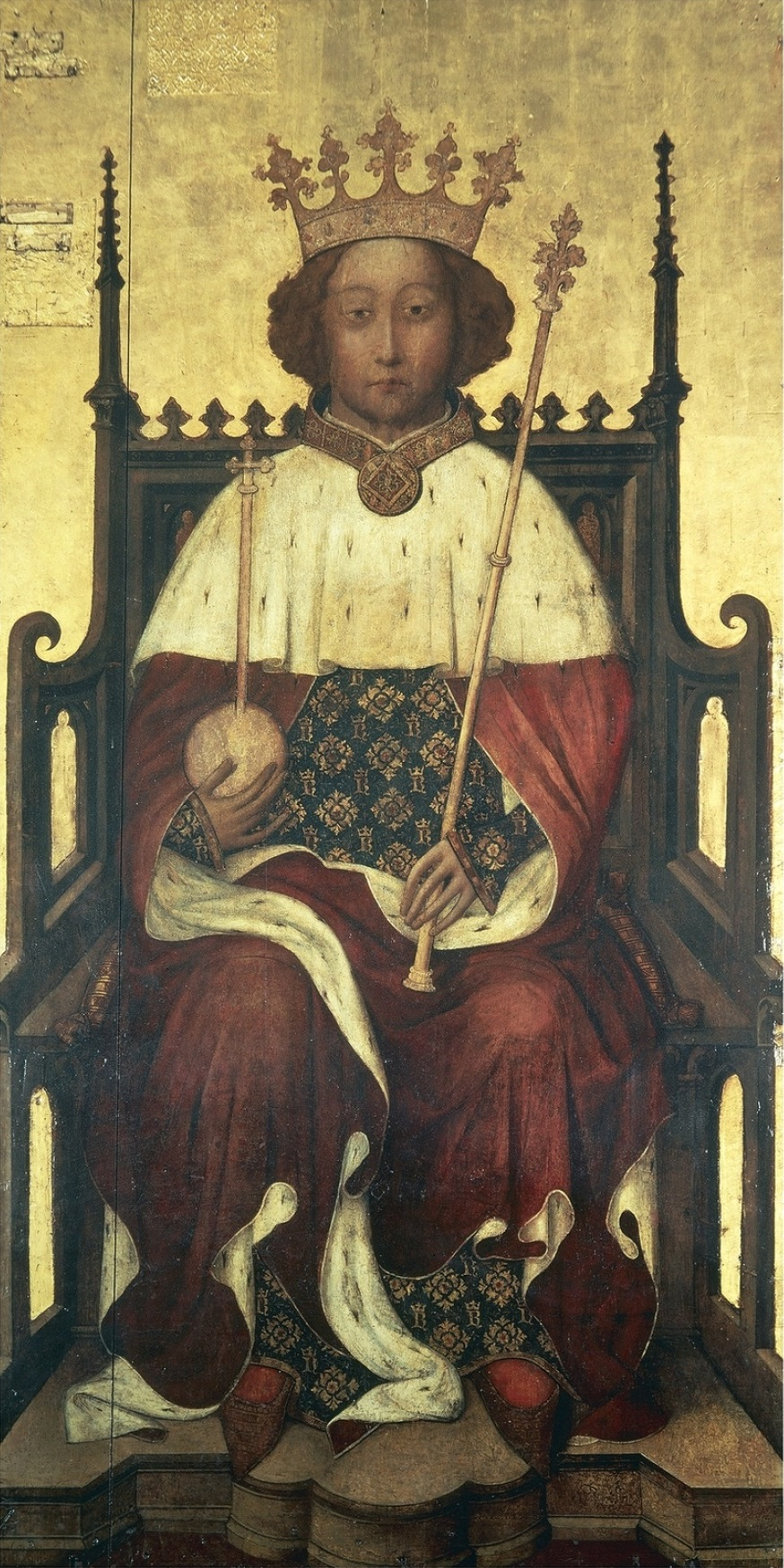
Richard II of England

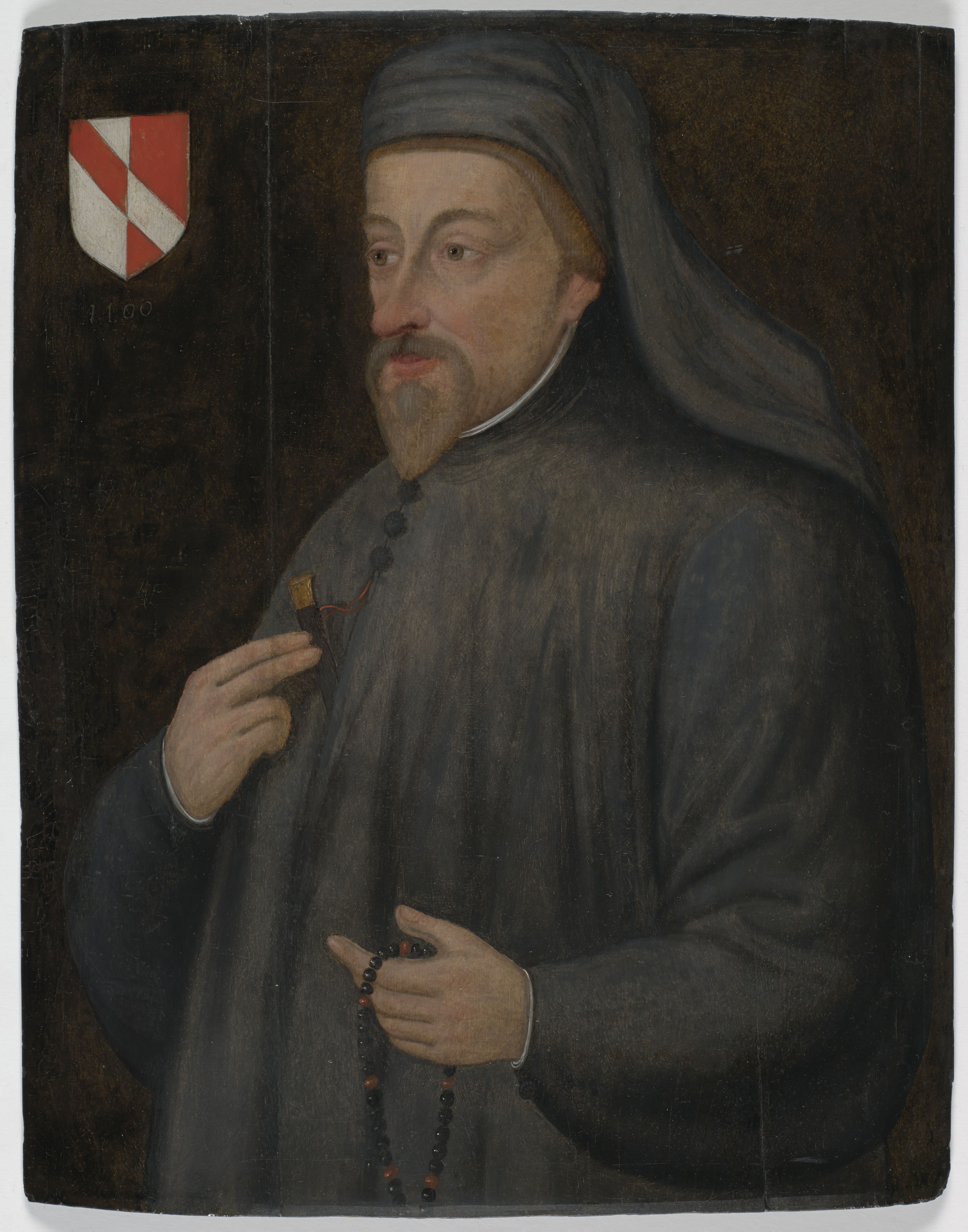
Geoffrey Chaucer

- January 7
  - Thomas Holland, 1st Duke of Surrey, English politician (executed) (b. 1374)
  - John Montagu, 3rd Earl of Salisbury, English earl (executed) (b. 1350)
- January 13 – Thomas le Despenser, 1st Earl of Gloucester, English politician (executed) (b. 1373)
- January 16 – John Holland, 1st Duke of Exeter, English politician (executed)
- February 14 – King Richard II of England, (probably murdered) (b. 1367)
- April 21 – John Wittlebury, English politician (b. 1333)
- April 23 – Aubrey de Vere, 10th Earl of Oxford, third son of John de Vere (b. 1338)
- April 28 – Baldus de Ubaldis, Italian jurist (b. 1327)
- June 5 – Frederick I, Duke of Brunswick-Lüneburg, rival King of the Romans
- June 17 – Jan of Jenštejn, Archbishop of Prague (b. 1348)
- October 25 – Geoffrey Chaucer, English poet (b. c. 1343)
- November 8 – Peter of Aragon, Aragonese infante (b. 1398)
- November 20 – Elizabeth of Moravia, Margravine of Meissen (b. 1355)
- November – Tarabya of Ava (b. 1368)
- December – Archibald the Grim, Scottish magnate (b. 1328)
- date unknown – Narayana Pandit, Indian mathematician (b. 1340)
