= Relic of an Emissary =

2011 Hong Kong historical fiction television series

- Official poster
- 洪武三十二
- Genre: Historical fiction Mystery thriller
- Created by: Wong Wai-sing
- Written by: Wong Kwok-fai; Choi Suk-yin
- Starring: Joe Ma; Michael Tse; Kate Tsui; Sammul Chan; Elanne Kong; Joel Chan; Ruco Chan; Lau Kong
- Opening theme: Country (江山) by Joe Ma
- Ending theme: I Wait For You (我等你) by Michael Tse and Kate Tsui
- Composers: Tang Chi-wai; Yip Siu-chung
- Country of origin: Hong Kong
- Original language: Cantonese
- No. of episodes: 30

Production
- Executive producer: Wong Wai-sing
- Production location: Hong Kong
- Camera setup: Multi camera
- Running time: 45 minutes (per episode)
- Production company: TVB

Original release
- Network: TVB Jade
- Release: 4 April – 13 May 2011

Relic of an Emissary
- intertitle
- Chinese: 洪武三十二
- Literal meaning: "Hongwu Thirty Two"
Transcriptions
Yue: Cantonese
- Yale Romanization: hóng wǔ sān shí'èr
- Jyutping: hung4 mo2 sam1 sap6 ji6

Relic of an Emissary (Chinese: 洪武三十二; literally "Hongwu 32") is a 2011 Hong Kong historical fiction television drama serial produced by TVB.

The 30-episode drama premiered 4 April 2011 on Hong Kong's TVB Jade and TVB HD Jade channels, airing five days a week. Wong Wai-sing, who produced TVB's The Academy trilogy series, serves as the drama's executive producer.

The drama is loosely based on the Jingnan campaign of the Ming Dynasty, a coup d'état that ended the Jianwen Emperor's brief four-year reign over Ming China. The Chinese title of the drama literally means "Hongwu 32", the 32nd year of the Hongwu Emperor's reign.

== Background ==
The story takes place during Zheng He's younger years, several years before his oceanic voyages. When the Jianwen Emperor ascended to the throne in 1399, he changed the era name to "Jianwen First Year" (建文元年). After Zhu Di usurped the throne in 1402, he purged all of Jianwen's supporters and ordered all documents that recorded the era name "Jianwen First Year" to be changed to "Hongwu Year 32" (洪武三十二年) in order to establish himself as the legitimate successor of the Hongwu Emperor, the first emperor of the Ming Dynasty.

== Plot overview ==
The story begins with the sons of the Hung-mo (Hongwu) Emperor returning to the capital city as a show of filial piety to their father, who has fallen extremely ill. Secretly, the princes are harboring intentions to succeed the throne. As a result, chaos surrounds the kingdom, and a chain of conspiracies and schemes begin occurring in the city...

While pursuing a mission, Brocade Guard captain Ngo Siu-fung loses his memory in an accident. As he begins to slowly piece back memories of his past, he realises that he was once a vicious, unreasonable, and merciless Brocade Guard. He decides to start anew and change his ways of style, but his colleagues are unable to see past Siu-fung's history of cruelty, and they assign him insignificant tasks to complete. Fortunately for Siu-fung, he saves Chu Wan-man, grandson of the emperor, who has dressed himself in plain clothes to observe the commoners of the city. The two become good friends and Wan-man appoints Siu-fung as his personal bodyguard.

The emperor dies, his posthumous edict robbed, and the kingdom is left with no heir. The princes all desire the throne, leaving the kingdom unprotected from future attacks. Impatient, Wan-man orders Siu-fung to find the edict as soon as possible to stabilise the chaotic situation. The powerful and intelligent fourth prince Chu Tai (Zhu Di), titled Prince Yin, also sends his most trusted adviser Ma Sam-po to investigate the case. Fighting to retrieve the edict, Siu-fung and Sam-po undergo a battle of wits and skill. They start an ambiguous friendship – though they see each other as equals, they are unable to work together because their loyalties lie elsewhere.

The edict is retrieved and Wan-man ascends to the throne, crowned as the Kin-man (Jianwen) Emperor. Soon after his coronation, mysterious cases begin to occur around the kingdom. Someone with an ulterior motive is intentionally framing Prince Yin of starting a coup.

Though Prince Yin is later proven to be innocent, Wan-man becomes really cautious of him. Aware that the new emperor has intentions in killing him, Prince Yin raises an army to overthrow him. Under the slogan of "clearing the court and pacifying national disaster" (清君側、靖國難), Prince Yin starts a coup d'état, that is later known to be called the Jingnan campaign.

== Production ==
=== Development ===
After Michael Tse's successful and popular portrayal of the undercover cop Laughing Gor in Wong's 2009 crime drama The Academy III: E.U., TVB had notions of creating a fourth installment of The Academy that would potentially continue with the character's story. After several negotiations with the company, Wong decided to drop the idea and instead went to produce a costume drama version of the series. The working title of the drama was changed from "The Turbulence of Jingnan" (靖難風雲) to "Hongwu 32".

A costume fitting and press conference was held on April 9, 2010, in the TVB studios in Tseung Kwan O with a total of 48 cast members. Filming began 18 April 2010 and ended on 28 July 2010.

=== Casting ===
First intended to be a continuation of The Academy series, casting for Relic of an Emissary (then known as "The Academy IV") placed an emphasis on keeping the original The Academy cast. Sammul Chan was the protagonist Lee Pak-kiu for all three installments; Kate Tsui was introduced in the second; Michael Tse, Elanne Kong, Leung Ka-ki, and Joel Chan were introduced in the third. After major changes were added to the script, which included story setting and character background, slight casting changes also occurred. Instead of Michael Miu leading the serial drama, Joe Ma was chosen instead. His portrayal of King Fuchai of Wu in The Conquest sparked interest for Wong to cast him as Chu Tai. Wong further mentioned that he wanted Ron Ng to be part of the cast as well, who portrayed the other protagonist Chung Lap-man in The Academy. However, the writers could not afford to write in another male lead.

== Cast and characters ==
Note: Character names are in Cantonese romanisation.

=== Main cast ===
- Michael Tse as Ngo Siu-fung (敖笑風) — the drama's main protagonist, a cold-blooded and ruthless commander of the Brocade Guards. While on a mission to escort Prince Chun to Jiangnan, Siu-fung loses his memory after an accident, but slowly regains it as the story progresses. Promoted as Brocade Guards deputy general in middle of the drama and lastly as Brocade Guards general.
- Joe Ma as Chu Tai, Prince Yin (燕王朱棣) — the powerful and intelligent fourth son of Hung-mo. Though Prince Yin helps his nephew succeed the throne, his extreme governing methods tend to clash with the Kin-man Emperor's more sympathetic approach to rule. Upset with the young emperor's reign — and believing himself to be the true heir to the throne — Prince Yin begins to secretly plot a coup.
- Sammul Chan as Ma Sam-po (馬三保) — Prince Yin's personal bodyguard and most trusted adviser. The son of a Hui family from Yunnan, Sam-po is a Semu and the descendant of a Persian official who served as Yunnan's governor during the early years of the Yuan Dynasty. When Sam-po was eleven, he was captured by Ming troops and made a eunuch. After Prince Yin overthrows the Kin-man Emperor, he gives Sam-po the name Cheng Wo (鄭和) and fulfills Sam-po's wish by granting him permission to explore the West.
- Kate Tsui as Shum Chin-sam (沈千三) / Wong Chor-chor (王楚楚) — a pair of twin female spies working for the Brocade Guards. The elder twin, Chin-sam, goes undercover as a madam and becomes the owner of the Willow Court, an established brothel in the capital. The younger twin, Chor-chor, eventually becomes Prince Yin's concubine, in an attempt to obtain information regarding Prince Yin's plan of rebellion.
- Elanne Kong as Chu Ying, Princess Wing-yeung (永暘公主朱櫻) — Prince Yin's younger sister and Sam-po's best friend.
- Joel Chan as Chu Wan-man, the Kin-man Emperor (建文帝朱允炆) — the Hung-mo Emperor's eldest and favourite grandson. Wan-man is described as a caring and gentle emperor, who places the well-being of his country and people first. Prince Yin sees Wan-man's compassion as a weakness, unfit for a ruler.

=== Recurring cast ===
- Ruco Chan as Chu Kuen, Prince Ning (寧王朱權) — the cunning and manipulative seventeenth son of Hung-mo. To maintain his superiority and power in court affairs, he purposely creates havoc between Prince Yin and the Kin-man Emperor to worsen their relationship.
- Lau Kong as Dou Hin (道衍) — a Buddhist monk. He later becomes Prince Yin's strategist, and receives the name Yiu Kwong-hau (姚廣孝).
- Gordon Liu as Yim Chun (嚴進) — the Brocade Guard general and Siu-fung's superordinate.
- Skye Chan as Tsui Yee-wah, Princess Yin (燕王妃徐儀華) — Prince Yin's wife.
- Leung Ka-ki as Ma Yan-wai (馬恩慧) — Wan-man's wife and later Empress. Her marriage to Wan-man is arranged by the Hung-mo Emperor, who believes that Yan-wai possesses the wisdom of a future Empress.
- Sire Ma as Fu Siu-kiu (傅小喬) — a maid who serves in the Brocade Guard dormitory. She was once the daughter of a noble, but due to certain legal matters, her family was arrested. She was almost sold to a brothel, but was saved by Princess Wing-yeung.
- Benjamin Yuen as Lee King-lung (李景隆) — a youthful and loyal general who serves for Kin-man Emperor. He falls in love with Princess Wing-yeung.

== Historical Inaccuarcies ==
- Zheng He is depicted in the series as a eunuch with the original name Ma Sampo and is eventually granted the name Zheng He (Cheng Wo in Cantonese) after winning the Jingnan Campaign. The Historical Zheng He's name was originally Ma He (SOURCE: Dreyer 2007, pp. 11, 148; Mills 1970, p. 5; Ray 1987, p. 66; Levathes 1996, p. 61.), with the nickname Sanpao (Sampo in Cantonese) being given to him as a reference to the Buddhist Three Jewels during his service under the Prince of Yan (SOURCE: Levathes 1996, p. 63.). When the Prince of Yan eventually became Emperor Yongle, Zheng was merely granted a change in surname from Ma to Zheng (SOURCE:Levathes 1996, pp. 72–73.).
- Yongle and his wife, the eventually Empress Renxiaowen, are depicted to be childless through the series with the future empress miscarrying and eventually adopting a son by the series' conclusion. The historical Empress Renxiaowen had already given birth to seven children by the start of the Jingnan Campaign with three of which being sons, all of whom played some part in their father's rebellion (SOURCE: Ellen Soullière, "Palace Women in the Ming dynasty: 1368-1644" (Doctoral dissertation, Princeton University, 1987) 19, 22–24.). The eldest son and eventual Hongxi Emperor, Zhu Gaochi was 20 by the start of his fathers rebellion (SOURCE: Frederick W. Mote; Denis Twitchett (26 February 1988). The Cambridge History of China: Volume 7, The Ming Dynasty, 1368–1644. Cambridge University Press. pp. 277–. ISBN 978-0-521-24332-2.), while the second son Zhu Gaoxu the Prince of Han was 18 and would not only go on to participate in fighting against his cousin's forces but go on to follow in his father's footsteps by rebelling against his own nephew, albeit unsuccessfully. (Source: Ming Shilu, Part Taizong, Volume 186)
- The series depicts Yongle and the other princes being present during the passing of their father and staying in the capital to aid in the administration of their nephew before the Jianwen Emperor turns on them and requires then stay at the capital under the guise of aiding his court in order to prevent them from accessing their principalities' armies to rebel. In history, Yongle and the other princes where not present in the capital during the death of Emperor Hongwu and would be prevented from arrive to mourn by the succeeding Jianwen whom immediately ordered his uncles stay in their principalities (source: History of Ming, Volume 3: 遺詔曰：「朕膺天命三十有一年，憂危積心，日勤不怠，務有益於民。奈起自寒微，無古人之博知，好善惡惡，不及遠矣。今得萬物自然之理，其奚哀念之有。皇太孫允炆仁明孝友，天下歸心，宜登大位。內外文武臣僚同心輔政，以安吾民。喪祭儀物，毋用金玉。孝陵山川因其故，毋改作。天下臣民，哭臨三日，皆釋服，毋妨嫁娶。諸王臨國中，毋至京師。諸不在令中者，推此令從事。」)with Yongle in particular being intercepted at Huai'an when he headed for the capital with his army to mourn.(source: Chan Hok-lam. "Legitimating Usurpation: Historical Revisions under the Ming Yongle Emperor (r. 1402–1424)". The Legitimation of New Orders: Case Studies in World History. Chinese University Press, 2007. ISBN 9789629962395. Accessed 12 Oct 2012.)
- In the series Yongle is depicted having fiend his insanity to convince Jianwen to permit his return to the Yan principality to recover. In reality, it was Yongle's three sons that were being held hostage at the Ming capital and Yongle fiend his insanity to convince the court to permit his sons' be allowed to go visit him at Beiping. (source: Chan Hok-lam. "Legitimating Usurpation: Historical Revisions under the Ming Yongle Emperor (r. 1402–1424)". The Legitimation of New Orders: Case Studies in World History. Chinese University Press, 2007. ISBN 9789629962395. Accessed 12 Oct 2012.)
- The series depicts a plot point about Emperor Hongwu's will being stolen and the heir left unclear. In reality Hongwu left not will and Jianwen succeeded his grandfather without the instruction of a will albeit in violation of the Huang-Ming Zuxun. (source: Chan Hok-lam. "Legitimating Usurpation: Historical Revisions under the Ming Yongle Emperor (r. 1402–1424)". The Legitimation of New Orders: Case Studies in World History. Chinese University Press, 2007. ISBN 9789629962395. Accessed 12 Oct 2012.)

== Reception ==
Relic of an Emissary received mixed reviews. On Douban, the drama earned a rating of 6.8 out of 10 based on over 2700 votes. During broadcast period, the drama received several complaints concerning blatant scenes of violence and sexuality, protesting that such aggressive and intimate content were unsuitable for broadcast during family viewing time.

== Viewership ratings ==
The following is a table that includes a list of the total ratings points based on television viewership. "Viewers in millions" refers to the number of people, derived from TVB Jade ratings (not including TVB HD Jade), in Hong Kong who watched the episode live. The peak number of viewers are in brackets.

Week	Episode(s)	Average points	Peaking points	Viewers (in millions)	AI	References
1	1 — 5	26	—	1.66 ( — )	—	
2	6 — 10	27	—	1.72 ( — )		
3	11 — 15	25	—	1.59 ( — )		
4	16 — 20	26	—	1.66 ( — )		
5	21 — 25	27	—	1.72 ( — )		
6	26 — 30	28	29	1.78 (1.85)		

== Awards and nominations ==
=== 45th TVB Anniversary Awards 2011 ===
- Nominated: Best Drama

== See also ==
- E.U. (TV series)
