= Yongle Encyclopedia =

1408 Chinese encyclopedia

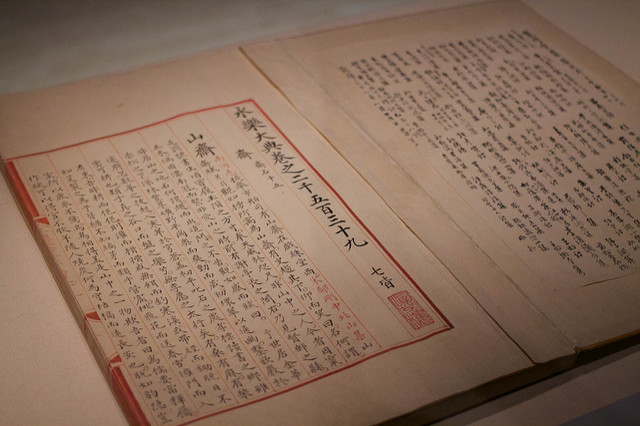
The Yongle Encyclopedia (volume 2539), in 2014, on display at the National Library of China

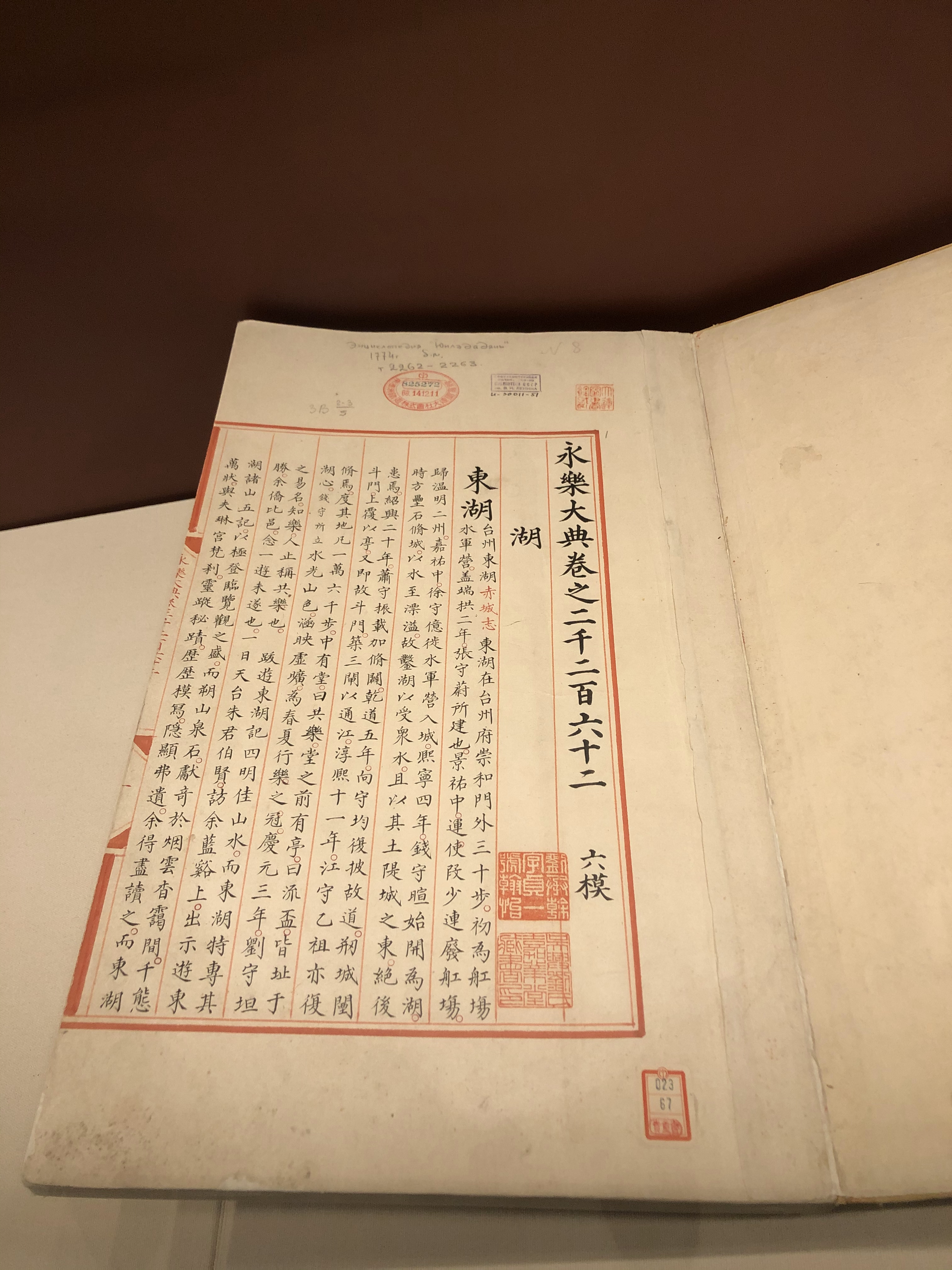
The Yongle Encyclopedia volume 2262

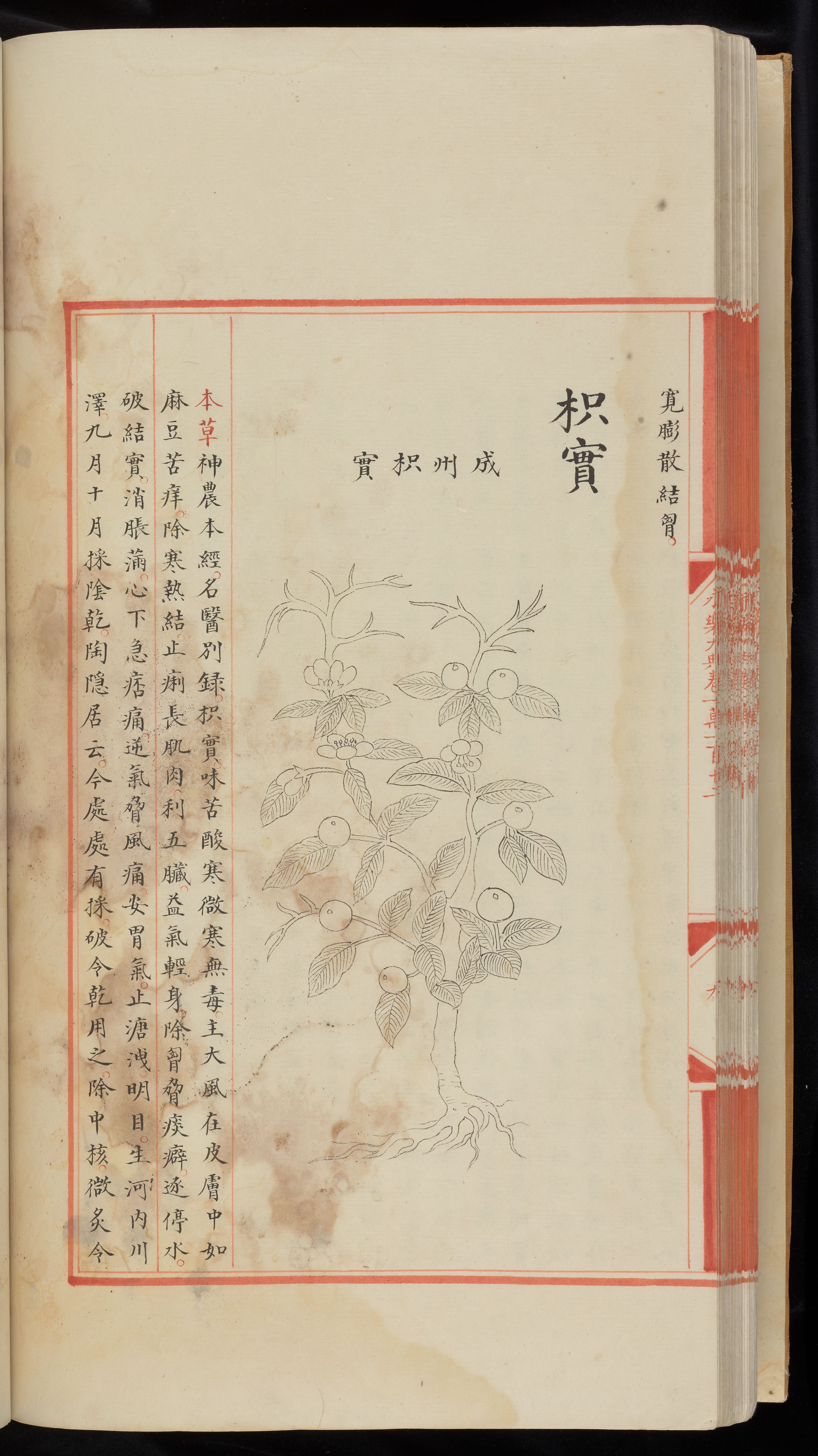
A page from the manuscript of the Yongle Encyclopedia. Chester Beatty Library

The Yongle Encyclopedia (English: /jɒŋlə/) or Yongle Dadian (traditional Chinese: 永樂大典; simplified Chinese: 永乐大典; pinyin: Yǒnglè Dàdiǎn; Wade–Giles: Yung-lo Ta-tien; lit. 'Great Canon of Yongle') is a Chinese leishu encyclopedia commissioned by the Yongle Emperor (r. 1402–1424) of the Ming dynasty in 1403 and completed by 1408. It comprised 22,937 manuscript rolls in 11,095 volumes. Fewer than 400 volumes survive today, comprising about 800 rolls, or 3.5% of the original work.

Most of the text was lost during the latter half of the 19th century, in the midst of events including the Second Opium War and the Boxer Rebellion. Its sheer scope and size made it the world's largest general encyclopedia, until it was surpassed by Wikipedia in late 2007, nearly six centuries later.

== Background ==
Although known for his military achievements, the Yongle Emperor (r. 1402–1424) was an intellectual who enjoyed reading. His love for research led him to develop the idea of categorizing literary works into a reference encyclopedia to preserve rare books and simplify research. Instrumental to this undertaking were the Yongle Emperor's own changes to the function of the Hanlin Academy.

Prior to his reign, the Hanlin Academy was responsible for various clerical tasks such as drafting proclamations and edicts. The Yongle Emperor decided to elevate the status of the Hanlin Academy and began selecting only the highest-ranking recruits for the academy. Clerical duties were relegated to Imperial officers, whereas the Hanlin Academy, now full of elite scholars, began to work on literary projects for the Emperor.

== Development ==
The Yongle Encyclopedia was commissioned by the Yongle Emperor and completed in 1408. In 1404, a year after the work was commissioned, a team of 100 scholars, mostly from the Hanlin Academy, led by Xie Jin completed a manuscript called A Complete Work of Literature (文獻大成). The Yongle Emperor rejected this work and insisted on adding other volumes.

In 1405, under the Yongle Emperor's command, the number of scholars rose to 2,169. Scholars were sent all over China to find books and expand the encyclopedia. The Yongle Emperor assigned his personal advisor, Yao Guangxiao, a monk, Zheng Ci, the minister of ceremonies, and Liu Jichi, the deputy minister of punishment, as co-editors of the encyclopedia to supervise and support Xie Jin. The scholars spent four years compiling the leishu encyclopedia, under the leadership of general editor Yao Guangxiao.

The encyclopedia was completed in 1408 at the Guozijian in Nanjing (now Nanjing University). It comprised 22,937 manuscript rolls or chapters, in 11,095 volumes, occupying roughly 40 cubic metres (1,400 ft^{3}), and using 370 million Chinese characters—the equivalent of about a quarter of a billion English words (around six times as many as the Encyclopædia Britannica).

The leishu was intended to include every commentary that had been written on the Chinese classics, as well as all history, philosophy, arts, and sciences. It was a massive collation of excerpts and works from the entirety of Chinese literature and knowledge. The Yongle Emperor was so pleased with the finished encyclopedia that he named it after his reign, and personally wrote a lengthy preface highlighting the importance of preserving the works.

== Style ==
The encyclopedia's physical appearance differed from any other Chinese encyclopedias of the time. It was larger in size, used special paper, and was bound in a "wrapped back" (包背裝, bao bei zhuang) style. The use of red ink for titles and authors, an ink exclusively reserved for the emperor, helped to confirm that the volumes were of royal production.

Each volume was protected by a hard cover which was wrapped in yellow silk. Unlike other encyclopedias, it was not arranged by subject, but by 洪武正韻 (Hongwu zhengyun), a system by which characters are ordered phonetically or rhythmically. The use of this system helped the reader find specific entries with ease.

Although printing already existed during the Ming dynasty, the Yongle Encyclopedia was exclusively handwritten. Each handwritten entry was a collection of existing literature, some of which derived from rare and delicate texts. The importance of the Yongle Encyclopedia was the preservation of such texts, and the vast number of subjects it covered.

== Reception ==
At the end of the Ming, scholars began to question the Yongle Emperor's motives for not commissioning more copies of the encyclopedia, instead of keeping them in storage. Some scholars, like Sun Chengze, a Qing scholar, theorized that the Yongle Emperor used the literary project for political reasons. At the time, Neo-Confucians were refusing to take civil service exams, or participate in any imperial duties, due to the Yongle Emperor's violent usurpation of the throne. His literary undertaking did attract the attention of these scholars, who eventually joined the project.

Because the Yongle Emperor did not want a strictly Confucian point of view for the encyclopedia, non-Confucian scholars were also included, and contributed to the Buddhist, Daoist, and Divination sections of the encyclopedia. The inclusion of these subjects intensified the scrutiny against the Yongle Emperor amongst Neo-Confucians who believed the encyclopedia was nothing but "wheat and chaff". However, despite the varied opinions, the encyclopedia is widely regarded as a priceless contribution in preserving a wide range of China's historic works, many of which would be lost otherwise.

== Disappearance ==
The Yongle Encyclopedia was placed in the Belvedere of Literary Profundity in Nanjing until 1421, when the Yongle Emperor moved the capital to Beijing and placed the Yongle Encyclopedia in the Forbidden City. In 1557, during the reign of the Jiajing Emperor, the encyclopedia was narrowly saved from a fire that burnt down three palaces in the Forbidden City. A manuscript copy was commissioned by the Jiajing Emperor in 1562 and completed in 1567. The original copy was lost afterwards. The theories as to what happened to the original are:

- The original was destroyed in the late Ming dynasty. In 1644, rebel leader Li Zicheng overthrew the Ming dynasty and took over the Ming capital, Beijing. A few months later, he was defeated by the coalition of Wu Sangui and Dorgon. Li burned the Forbidden City when he withdrew from Beijing. The Yongle Dadian may have been destroyed in the fire.
- The original was buried with the Jiajing Emperor. The time when the Jiajing Emperor was buried was very close to the time of completion of the manuscript copy. Jiajing Emperor died in December 1566, but was buried three months later, in March 1567. One possibility is that they were waiting for the manuscript to be completed.
- The original was burned in the Qianqing Palace fire.
- The original was hidden.

The original manuscript of the Yongle Dadian was almost completely lost by the end of the Ming dynasty. 90 percent of the 1567 manuscript survived until the Second Opium War during the Qing dynasty. In 1860, the Anglo-French invasion of Beijing resulted in the majority of the encyclopedia being burnt or looted, with British and French soldiers taking large portions of the manuscript as souvenirs.

5,000 volumes remained by 1875, less than half of the original, which dwindled to 800 by 1894. During the Boxer Rebellion and the 1900 Eight-Nation Alliance occupation of Beijing, allied soldiers took hundreds of volumes, and many were destroyed in the Hanlin Academy fire. Only 60 volumes remained in Beijing.

== Current status ==
The most complete collection is kept at the National Library of China in Beijing, which holds 221 volumes. The next largest collection is at the National Palace Museum in Taipei, which holds 62 volumes.

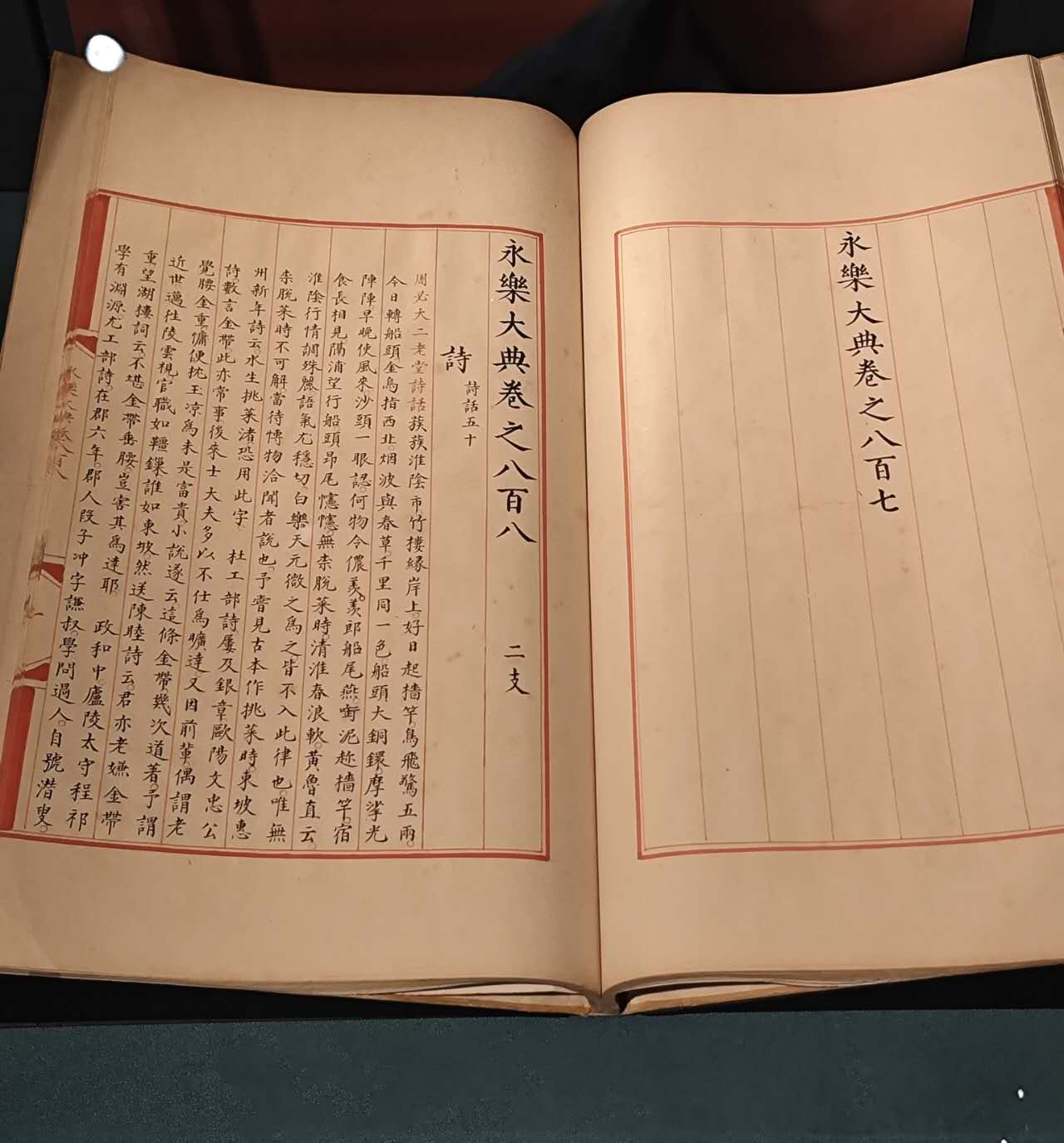
The Yongle Encyclopedia volume 808 on display at the Bodleian Library in Oxford University

Sections 10,270 and 10,271 of the Yongle Encyclopedia reside at the Huntington Library in San Marino, California.

51 volumes are in the United Kingdom held at the British Library, the Bodleian Library in Oxford, the School of Oriental and African Studies of the University of London, and Cambridge University Library; the Library of Congress of the United States holds 41 volumes; Cornell University Library has 6 volumes; 5 volumes are held in various libraries across Germany.

Two volumes were sold at a Paris auction on 7 July 2020, for more than €8 million (US$9 million). This set consisted of the Hu (lake) volume (2260-2283) and the Sang (funeral) volume (7391-7392). They were repatriated to China by its buyer, and in 2026, were officially deposited at the China National Archives of Publications and Culture, at its Hangzhou branch location.

== See also ==
- Chinese encyclopedia
- Four Great Books of Song
- List of most expensive books and manuscripts
- Complete Classics Collection of Ancient China
- Complete Library of the Four Treasuries
