= Prince of Hejian =

Prince of Hejian may refer to:

- Princes (or kings) of Hejian Kingdom during the Han dynasty
- Sima Yong (died 306), Jin dynasty prince
- Murong Xi (385–407), Later Yan emperor, known as Prince of Hejian before he took the throne
- Zhang Yu (general) (1343–1401), Ming dynasty general who died in the Jingnan campaign, posthumously honored as Prince of Hejian
