= Tie Xuan =

Chinese politician (1366–1402)

Tie Xuan 铁铉
- Grand Protector (太保)
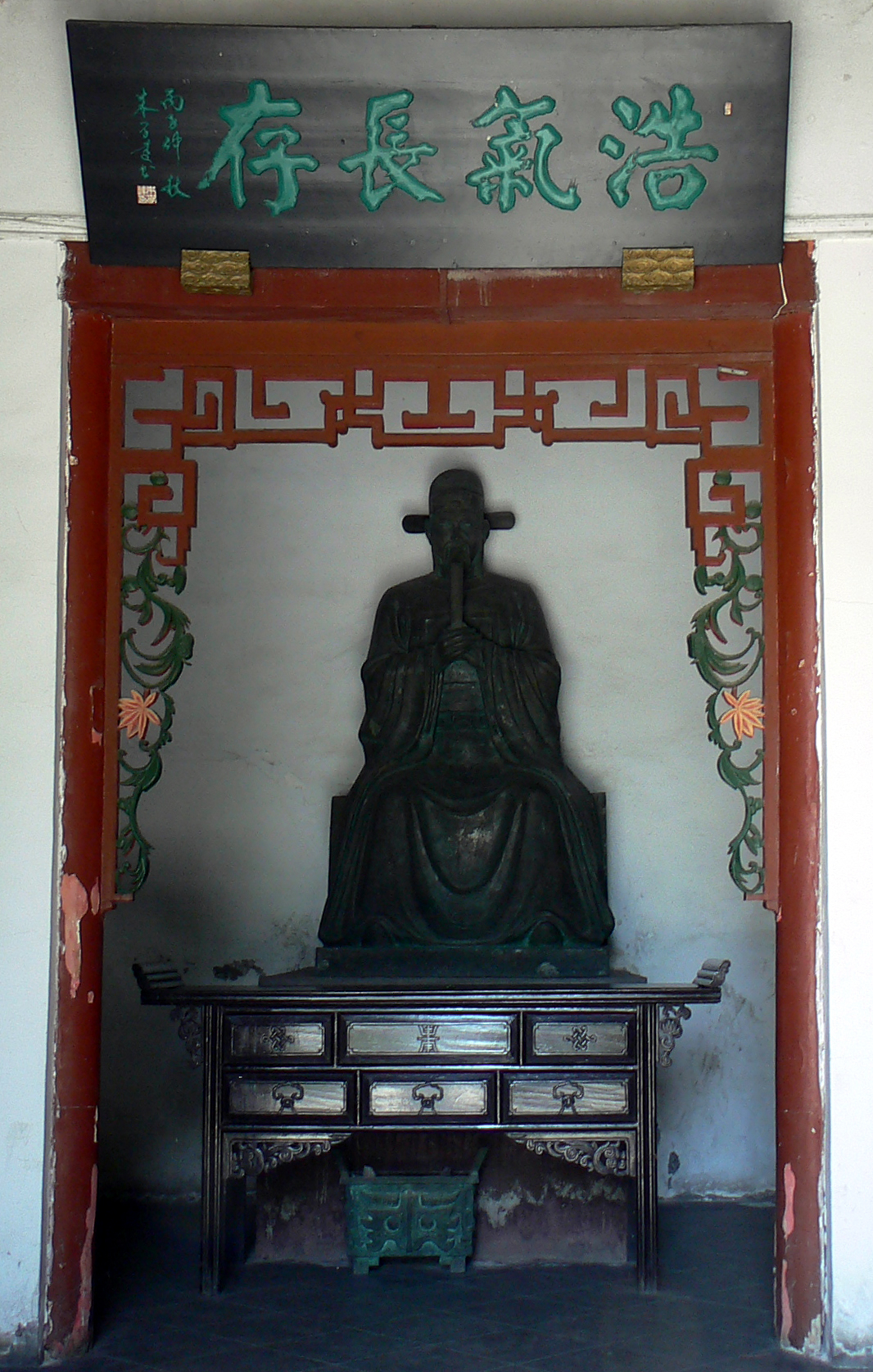
- Bronze statue of Tie Xuan at the Ancestral Hall of Lord Tie by Daming Lake, Jinan
- Born: 1366; Deng county, Henan (modern-day Dengzhou)
- Died: 1402 (age 35–36); Nanjing
Posthumous name
- Zhongxiang (忠襄); Zhongding (忠定)
- Occupation: Minister of War

Tie Xuan (Chinese: 铁铉; 1366–1402), courtesy name Dingshi (鼎石), was a Chinese politician during the Ming dynasty. born in Dengzhou, Henan during the Yuan dynasty to a Semu Hui family, he served as a loyal officer to the deposed Ming dynasty emperor Jianwen. During the Jingnan campaign, when the Prince of Yan Zhu Di (later the Yongle Emperor) rebelled against his nephew, the Jianwen Emperor, Tie Xuan refused to support Zhu Di. Following the fall of Nanjing and the Jianwen Emperor's disappearance, Zhu Di sentenced Tie Xuan to death by having his limbs torn off and fried in oil. Later generations honored him for his unyielding loyalty. In various regions of China, temples are set up in Tie's honor to offer rituals to him. In the Southern Ming period, he was honored with the title of Grand Protector (太保) and given the posthumous name Zhongxiang (忠襄), meaning loyal assistant. Later, during Qianlong's reign in the Qing dynasty, he was given the posthumous name Zhongding (忠定).

== Life ==
=== Early life ===
During the Hongwu period, Tie Xuan did well in his studies. After graduating, he was appointed to an official position. Later, he was granted the post of judge (duan shi) where he presided over judicial cases and resolved them quickly. The Hongwu Emperor was happy with his performance and gave him the courtesy name Dingshi (鼎石). In the early years of Jianwen's reign, he was appointed to a high administrative position in Shandong province. When Li Jinglong and his army were sent north to fight against Zhu Di, Tie Xuan gave them military rations and supplies. In the third year of Jianwen (1400), Li Jinglong was defeated at Baigou River. He escaped alone on horseback to Dezhou, where the guards at the gate saw him and despaired at his losses. Tie Xuan and those who helped the army of Gao Yi were also deeply saddened. He went from Linyi straight to Jinan with Sheng Yong and Song Can's army to fight to the death in defense. The Prince of Yan's army went charging to Dezhou, and Li Jinglong ran to Tie Xuan. Dezhou was lost. The Yan troops got millions more of their war supplies and then they went to fight in Jinan. Li Jinglong lost again and went south.

=== Fight against the Yan army ===
On the 15th day of the 5th month, Zhu Di's army attacked Jinan, and Tie Xuan and Sheng Yong defended the city. Zhu Di sent them a letter urging them to surrender, but it failed. On the 17th day of the 5th month, Zhu Di's Yan army diverted a river by digging into its embankment and released water into the city. Tie Xuan, realizing that the situation was not encouraging, sent 1,000 men to feign surrender. Zhu Di was overjoyed, and the Yan army's officers and soldiers all cheered. Tie Xuan ordered the rest of his warriors to lie on top of the city walls and wait for Zhu Di to enter. They were to ambush him by throwing down iron panels; a supporting ambush was to take place at the broken bridge. Soon after, when Zhu Di had not yet entered the city, the iron panels were unexpectedly thrown down. Zhu Di was greatly alarmed and fled. The troops hidden for the ambush were exposed, and the bridge between them was also not yet cut off. Zhu Di urged his horse to run quickly and go. Furious, Zhu Di decided to use cannons to bombard the city. Tie Xuan wrote on some wooden tablets, "The Emperor Gao's spirit tablet" (高皇帝神牌) several times and hung them down from the top of the city walls. The Yan army was obliged to cease the bombardment. After more than three months under siege, Jinan continued to defend itself. At that time, Ping An's troops there numbered 200,000, and they planned to recover the city of Dezhou. The Prince of Yan was fearful, so he lifted the siege to return north.

Zhu Di himself launched his troops again. The offensive was set and determined, but after less than two days, he abandoned it and departed. He believed that only by taking Jinan could he cut off the north-south passage. On the spot, he delimited the boundary and guard. It was not difficult for the Yingtianfu (the Nanjing-based government of the Jianwen Emperor) to take it. Consequently, he took advantage of Li Jinglong's dash. With all his strength, he attacked, thinking that he must attack and seize Jinan. Because of Tie Xuan, he failed, and he was frustrated. The Jianwen Emperor heard this and was very pleased. He dispatched an official to go and show appreciation, to bestow gold, to confer upon him the title "the third" (三世). Tie Xuan entered the palace to pay his respects and offer thanks. The Jianwen Emperor again honored him with a banquet and reception. All of Tie Xuan's suggestions were imposed and adopted. Tie Xuan was promoted to the Shandong left minister position in its government. In the 12th month of that year, he was promoted to an official in the Ministry of War. The Jianwen Emperor replaced Sheng Yong with Li Jinglong as General of Yan, and he assigned Tie Xuan to participate in military affairs. That winter, Sheng Yong defeated Zhu Di at Dongchang and beheaded his general, Zhang Yu. Zhu Di fled back to Beiping (now Beijing). Since then, the Yan troops have all gone via Xuzhou, Pei County, to go south. They would not dare again to go via Shandong.

As the Yan troops advanced day by day, the Jianwen Emperor ordered the Liaodong military official Yang Wen to command 100,000 troops to go ahead and link up with Tie Xuan, to break off the Yan troop's escape route. Yang Wen's army arrived at Zhigu (in Tianjin), and was defeated by the Yan General Song Gui; not one of them arrived in Jinan. In the fourth month of the fourth year of Jianwen (1402), the Yan army fought against the central army in the south of the Xiaohe River, and Tie Xuan and the generals had some successes. Both sides linked up to fight at Lingbi, but Ping An and other soldiers were dispersed and captured. After this, Sheng Yong was also defeated. The Yan troops crossed the river, and attacked Tie Xuan's soldiers stationed at Huaishang. That army was also defeated.

=== Unyielding and dying ===
Soon after Tie Xuan's soldiers were defeated, Tie Xuan was captured. But he refused to surrender. In court, he sat with his back turned in order to insult Zhu Di. Zhu Di ordered him to turn around, but Tie Xuan refused to listen, even after his ears and nose were cut off. Zhu Di commanded that his flesh be cooked and then stuffed into his mouth, asking, "Is it not sweet?" Tie Xuan replied sternly, "The flesh of a faithful official and filial son, why would it not be sweet?" Thereupon, his limbs were torn off. Tie Xuan died after incessant torture. After he died, they again used oil to cook his corpse. During the course of events, he wished to face north to worship, but the heat caused oil to unexpectedly splash and drop. Tie Xuan's wife, Mrs. Yang, and their two daughters were put into the Royal Academy (China), and forced to become prostitutes. His son, Tie Fu'an, was exiled to Hechi, and his 83-year-old father, Tie Zhongming, and his mother, Mrs. Xue, were exiled to Hainan. Mrs. Yang died of illness; the two daughters refused to agree to be disgraced. Later, after Zhu Di pardoned them, they were married off to scholars. Tie Xuan's second son, Tie Fushu, fled to Manchuria beyond the wall.

Although the Yongle Emperor Zhu Di hated Tie Xuan, he still praised his loyalty. At the beginning of Ming Shenzong Wanli Emperor's rule, an imperial edict was issued ordering the offering of "sacrifices to the Jianwen Emperor's court at all the officials' native villages." Tie Xuan was decorated as the seventh ranking loyal official to Jianwen in his temple. In the time of the Southern Ming's Hongguang Emperor, Zhu Yousong, the title "Grand Protector" (太保) was posthumously conferred upon Tie Xuan, as well as the posthumous name Zhongxiang (忠襄). Qing Gaozong Qianlong conferred the posthumous name Zhongding (忠定). In various locations in Shandong, there are many Tie Gong (鐵公) temples, all offering sacrifices to Tie Xuan. Jinan's Da Ming lakeside has a Tie Gong temple. The people of Jinan regard his spirit as their local city god because he was a native of their city.
