= Prince of Dai (Ming dynasty) =

Ming dynasty princely peerage

The Prince of Dai (Chinese: 代王) was a Ming dynasty princely peerage created by the Hongwu Emperor for his 13th son, Zhu Gui, in 1378. The peerage was initially named the Prince of Yu (Chinese: 豫王) with its fief in Nanchang. In 1392, the peerage gained its present name and its fief was relocated to Datong, one of the nine strategically important cities of the Ming dynasty since 1487.

== Generation poem ==
The holders of Prince of Dai peerage used the following generation poem:

逊仕成聪俊，充廷鼐鼎彝，傅贻连秀郁，炳耀壮洪基.

Xun Shi Cheng Cong Jun, Chong Ting Nai Ding Yi, Fu Yi Lian Xiu Yu, Bing Yao Zhuang Hong Ji

The generation poem was used until Fu generation which was the same generation as that of Zhu Cilang, a crown prince of Chongzhen Emperor.

== The Princedom of Dai ==
- Zhu Gui (朱桂; 25 August 1374 – 29 December 1446), Hongwu Emperor's 13th son by Consort Hui of Guo clan, who held the princedom from 1378 to 1392 as Prince of Yu and from 1392 to 1446 as Prince of Dai and was posthumously honoured as Prince Jian of Dai (代簡王)
  - Zhu Xuntuan (朱遜煓; 1393–1418), Zhu Gui's first son who held the title of heir son to Princedom of Dai from 1404 to 1418 and was posthumously honoured as Prince Li of Dai (代戾王)
    - Zhu Shichan (朱什壥; 1410–1463), Zhu Xuntuan's first son who held the princedom from 1448 to 1463 and was posthumously honoured as Prince Yin of Dai (代隱王)
      - Zhu Chenglian (朱成錬; 1437–1489), Zhu Shichan's first son who held the princedom from 1466 to 1489 and was posthumously honoured as Prince Hui of Dai (代惠王)
        - Zhu Conghui (朱聰沬; 1464–1498), Zhu Chenglian's first son who held the title of Prince of Wuyi (武邑王) from 1479 to 1489 when he was deprived of this title for improper behavior during the mourning and was posthumously honoured as Prince Si of Dai (代思王)
          - Zhu Junzhang (朱俊杖; 1480–1527), Zhu Conghui's first son who held the princedom from 1498 to 1527 and was posthumously honoured as Prince Yi of Dai (代懿王)
            - Zhu Chongyao (朱充燿; 1497–1547), Zhu Junzhang's first son who held the princedom from 1530 to 1547 and was posthumously honoured as Prince Zhao of Dai (代昭王)
              - Zhu Tingqi (朱廷埼; 1526–1573), Zhu Chongyao's first son who held the princedom from 1549 to 1573 and was posthumously honoured as Prince Gong of Dai (代恭王)
                - Zhu Naixuan (朱鼐鉉; 1557–1594), Zhu Tingqi's first son who held the princedom from 1581 to 1594 and was posthumously honoured as Prince Ding of Dai (代定王)
                - Zhu Naijun (朱鼐鈞; 1559–1627), Zhu Tingqi's second son who held the princedom from 1596 to 1627 and was posthumously honoured as Prince Kang of Dai (代康王)
                  - Zhu Dingwei (朱定渭; d.1629), Zhu Naijun's second son who held the princedom from 1627 to 1629 and was not given posthumous name (代王)
                    - Zhu Yiting (朱彜梃; d. 1640), Zhu Dingwei's first son who held the princedom from 1632 to 1640 and was posthumously honoured as Prince Yu of Dai (代裕王)
                      - Zhu Fuji (朱傅㸄; d. 1644), Zhu Yiting's first son who held the princedom from 1640 to 1644 when he was captured by Li Zicheng and was not given posthumous name (代王)
        - Zhu Congjuan (朱聰涓; 1472–1547), Zhu Chenglian's third son who held the title of Prince of Lechang (樂昌王) from 1483 to 1547 and acted as clan councillor of Princedom of Dai from 1489 to 1498

== Cadet lines ==
=== Prince of Guangling ===
- Zhu Xunmin (朱遜𤇜; 1402–1459), Zhu Gui's second son who held the princedom from 1404 to 1459 and was posthumously honoured as Prince Rongxu of Guangling (廣霛榮虛王)
  - Zhu Shizi (朱仕【土兹】; 1428-12 October 1496), Zhu Xunmin's first son who held the princedom from 1460 to 1496 and was posthumously honoured as Prince Zhuangyu of Guangling (廣靈莊裕王)
    - Zhu Chengkuan (朱成【金款】; d.1523), Zhu Shizi's first son who held the princedom from 1499 to 1523 and was posthumously honoured as Prince Shunjian of Guangling (廣靈順簡王)
      - Zhu Conghan (朱聪汉; d.1530), Zhu Chengkuan's first son who held the princedom from 1525 to 1530 and was posthumously honoured as Prince Xuanhe of Guangling (广灵宣和王)
        - Zhu Jiangui (朱俊槻; d. 1546), Zhu Conghan's first son who held the princedom from 1532 to 1546 and was posthumously honoured as Prince Kangding of Guangling (廣靈康定王)
          - Zhu Chongjin (朱充煡; d. 1566), Zhu Jiangui's first son who held the princedom from 1559 to 1566 and was posthumously honoured as Prince Rongzhao of Guangling (广灵荣昭王)
            - Zhu Tingshi (朱廷埘; d. 1603), Zhu Chongjin's first son who held the princedom from 1569 to 1603 and was not given a posthumous name (广灵王)
              - Zhu Naifen (朱鼐𫟴; d.1601), Zhu Tingshi's first son who held a title of chief son (长子) of Guangling and was not given posthumous name.
              - Zhu Naiji (朱鼐𨰷; d.1599), Zhu Tingshi's second son who held a title of defender general (镇国将军)
                - Zhu Dingshuang (朱鼎灀), Zhu Naiji's first son who inherited the princedom in 1603 (广灵王)

=== Prince of Lucheng ===
- Zhu Xunzhu (朱逊[火宁]; 1407-1471), Zhu Gui's third son who held the princedom from 1424 to 1471 and was posthumously honoured as Prince Xishun of Lucheng (潞城僖顺王)
  - Zhu Shilian (朱仕堜; 1436 - 1490), Zhu Xunzhu's third son who held the princedom from 1473 to 1490 and was posthumously honoured as Prince Anjian of Lucheng (潞城安简王)
    - Zhu Chenglei (朱成鑘; d.1499), Zhu Shilian's first son who held the princedom from 1492 to 1499 and was posthumously honoured as Prince Rong'an of Lucheng (潞城荣安王)
      - Zhu Conglang (朱聪蒗; d. 1522), Zhu Chenglei's first son who held the princedom from 1501 to 1522 and was posthumously honoured as Prince Xuanhui of Lucheng (潞城宣惠王)
        - Zhu Junsuo (朱俊梭; d. 1555), Zhu Conglang's first son who held the princedom from 1524 to 1555 and was posthumously honoured as Prince Duanxian of Lucheng (潞城端宪王)
          - Zhu Chonghuang (朱充熀; d. 1583), Zhu Junsuo's first son who held the princedom from 1557 to 1583 and was posthumously honoured as Prince Kangding of Lucheng (潞城康定王)
            - Zhu Tingbi (朱廷堛; d. 1608), Zhu Chonghuang's first son who held the princedom from 1587 to 1608 and was posthumously honoured as Prince Gongding of Lucheng (潞城恭恪王)
              - Zhu Naining (朱鼐鑏; d. 1622), Zhu Tingbi's first son who held the princedom from 1608 to 1622 and was not given posthumous name.

=== Prince of Shanyin ===
- Zhu Xunchen (朱逊煁; 1409-1467), Zhu Gui's fourth son who held the princedom from 1424 to 1467 and was posthumously honoured as Prince Kanghui of Shanyin (山阴康惠王)
  - Zhu Shifeng (朱仕堸; 1456 - 19 November 1503), Zhu Xunchen's first son who held the princedom from 1470 to 1503 and was posthumously honoured as Prince Duanyu of Shanyin (山阴端裕王)
    - Zhu Chengmou (朱成鍪; d. 1535), Zhu Shifeng's first son who held the princedom from 1506 to 1535 and was posthumously honoured as Prince Rongjing of Shanyin (山阴荣靖王)
      - Zhu Congshu (朱聪澍; d. 1555), Zhu Chengmou's first son who held the princedom from 1537 to 1555 and was posthumously honoured as Prince Xishun of Shanyin (山阴僖顺王)
        - Zhu Junshan (朱俊栅; d. 1603), Zhu Congshu's first son who held the princedom from 1558 to 1603 and was posthumously honoured as Prince Zhuangxian of Shanyin (山阴庄宪王)
          - Zhu Chongxi (朱充熙), Zhu Junshan's first son who held the princedom from 1623 (山阴王)
            - Zhu Tingli (朱廷理; d.1646), Zhu Chongxi's first son who held the princedom until 1646 when he surrendered to Qing dynasty (山阴王)

=== Prince of Xiangyuan ===
The peerage was created in 1424 for Zhu Xunqian with the fief in Puzhou (蒲州).

- Zhu Xunqian (朱逊燂; 1410-1462), Zhu Gui's fifth son who held the princedom from 1424 to 1462 and was posthumously honoured as Prince Gongjian of Xiangyuan (襄垣恭简王)
  - Zhu Shikui (朱仕㙺; 1430 - 30 July 1503), Zhu Xunqian's first son who held the princedom from 1465 to 1475 when he was accused of licentiousness and deprived of his title together with his children and two brother Zhu Shidi and Zhu Shiweng (襄垣王)
  - Zhu Shipi (朱仕坯; 1449 - 1539), Zhu Xunqian's fifth son who managed princedom affairs since 1475, held the princedom in 1539 and was posthumously honoured as Prince Anhui of Xiangyuan (襄垣安惠王), however his succession was considered counterfeit
    - Zhu Chengkui (朱成鍨; 1475-1566), Zhu Shipi's first son who held the princedom from 1541 to 1566 and was not given posthumous name after it was revealed that his father falsely claimed the princedom of Xiangyuan (襄垣王)
      - Zhu Congchan (朱聪浼), Zhu Chengkui's first son who held the title of chief son (长子)
        - Zhu Junqu (朱俊渠), Zhu Congchan's first son who held the title of chief grandson (长孙)
          - Zhu Chonghuang (朱充煌), Zhu Junqu's son who held the title of bulwark lieutenant from 1569 because of the fact he was not allowed to inherit the princedom (辅国中尉)
        - Zhu Junqin (朱俊寴; d. 1644), Zhu Junqu's relative who managed princedom affairs as defender lieutenant until 1644 when he was captured by Li Zicheng's forces and died by suicide (镇国中尉)

=== Prince of Lingqiu ===
The peerage was created in 1424 with the fief in Jiangzhou (绛州) since 1461.

- Zhu Xunquan (朱逊烇; 1413 - 1475), Zhu Gui's sixth son who held the princedom from 1424 to 1475 and was posthumously honoured as Prince Rongshun of Lingqiu (灵丘荣顺王)
  - Zhu Shimian (朱仕𡒳; 1433 - 17 May 1493), Zhu Xunquan's first son who held the princedom from 1477 to 1493 and was posthumously honoured as Prince Xijing of Lingqiu (灵丘僖靖王)
    - Zhu Chengyi (朱成鈠; 1457 - 5 May 1497), Zhu Shimian's first son who held the princedom from 1494 to 1497 and was posthumously honoured as Prince Zhuanghe of Lingqiu (灵丘庄和王)
      - Zhu Congge (朱聪滆; 1473 - 29 December 1555), Zhu Chengyi's first son who held the princedom from 1499 to 1555 and was posthumously honoured as Prince Duanyi of Lingqiu (灵丘端懿王)
        - Zhu Junge (朱俊格; d. 1545), Zhu Congge's first son who held the title of chief son (长子) from 1504 to 1545 and was posthumously honoured as Prince Kangdao of Lingqiu (灵丘康悼王)
          - Zhu Chongyi (朱充熼; d. 1551), Zhu Junge's first son who held the title of chief grandson (长孙) from 1522 to 1551 and was posthumously honoured as Prince Daoyi of Lingqiu (灵丘悼懿王)
            - Zhu Tingzhi (朱廷址; d.1552), Zhu Chongyi's first son who held the title of chief great grandson (曾长孙) from 1545 to 1552 and was posthumously honoured as Prince Huaixi of Lingqiu (灵丘怀僖王)
              - Zhu Nailian (朱鼐镰), Zhu Tingzhi's first son who held the princedom from 1561 to 1569 when he was stripped of his title (灵丘王). The princely title was abolished after his demotion.
              - Zhu Naifu (朱鼐鈇), Zhu Tingzhi's second son who managed the princedom affairs from 1570 to 1617 when he fell ill (灵丘府宗理)
                - Zhu Dingjie (朱鼎洁), Zhu Naifu's son who replaced Zhu Naifu due to his sickness as clan councillor and held the post until 1626
              - Zhu Naihun (朱鼐鍕), Zhu Tingzhi's son who managed the princedom since 1626 when he replaced Zhu Dingjie

=== Prince of Xuanning ===
The peerage was created in 1437 with the fief in Zezhou (泽州) since 1461.

- Zhu Xunliao (朱逊炓; 1423-1470), Zhu Gui's seventh son who held the princedom from 1437 to 1470 and was posthumously honoured as Prince Jingzhuang of Xuanning (宣宁靖庄王)
  - Zhu Shiluo (朱仕𡑤; d. 1491), Zhu Xunliao's seventh son who held the princedom from 1472 to 1491 and was Posthumously honoured as Prince Hexi of Xuanning (宣宁和僖王)
    - Zhu Chenggu (朱成钴; d. 1497), Zhu Shiluo's first son who held the princedom from 1494 to 1510 and was posthumously honoured as Prince Gong'an of Xuanning (宣宁恭安王)
      - Zhu Congyan (朱聪𤅊; d. 1528), Zhu Chenggu's first son who held the princedom from 1521 to 1528 and was posthumously honoured as Prince Kangjing of Xuanning (宣宁康靖王)
        - Zhu Junxiang (朱俊相; d. 1570), Zhu Congyan's first son who held the princedom from 1536 to 1570 and was posthumously honoured as Prince Zhaorong of Xuanning (宣宁昭荣王)
          - Zhu Chongcan (朱充灿; d. 1590), Zhu Junxiang's first son who held the princedom from 1580 to 1590 and was posthumously honoured as Prince Wenjian of Xuanning (宣宁温简王). After his death, the peerage was abolished and got managed by clan councillor.
        - Zhu JunX (朱俊X)
          - Zhu Chongbu (朱充𩌣), Zhu Chongcan's relative who managed the princedom as clan councillor since 1611

=== Prince of Huairen ===
The peerage was created in 1437 with the fief in Huozhou (霍州) since 1461.

- Zhu Xunhui (朱逊烠; 1425-1490), Zhu Gui's eighth son who held the princedom from 1437 to 1490 and was posthumously honoured as Prince Rongding of Huairen (怀仁荣定王)
  - Zhu Shiliao (朱仕㙩; 1444-1488), Zhu Xhunhui's second son who held the title of defender general until 1488 and was posthumously honoured as Prince Anxi of Huairen (怀仁安僖王)
    - Zhu Chengba (朱成钯; 1462-1492), Zhu Shiliao's first son who held the princedom from 1491 to 1492 and was posthumously honoured as Prince Gonghe of Huairen (怀仁恭和王)
      - Zhu Congshu (朱聪淑; 1485-1517), Zhu Chengba's first son who held the princedom from 1494 to 1517 and was posthumously honoured as Prince Wenhui of Huairen (怀仁温惠王)
      - Zhu Conglie (朱聪洌; 1488-1529), Zhu Chengba's sixth and second legitimate son who managed the princedom as defender general from 1517 to 1529 and was posthumously honoured as Prince Xikang of Huairen (怀仁僖仁王)
        - Zhu Junxie (朱俊榭; 1505-24 May 1571), Zhu Conglie's first son who held the princedom from 1543 to 1571 and was posthumously honoured as Prince Zhuangjian of Huairen (怀仁庄简王), however his succession was considered counterfeit, thus his son could not inherit
          - Zhu Chongyu (朱充𤉪), Zhu Junxie's son who managed the princedom from 1571 as a state general (奉国中尉)
            - Zhu Tingxuan (朱廷塇), Zhu Chongyu's third son who managed the princedom affairs since 1588 as defender lieutenant (镇国中尉)

=== Prince of Xichuan ===
- Zhu Xunliu (朱逊熮; 1429-1474), Zhu Gui's tenth son who held the princedom from 1442 to 1474 and was posthumously honoured as Prince Yi'an of Xichuan (隰川懿安王)
  - Zhu Shisui (朱仕[土遂]; 1445-1485), Zhu Xunliu's first son who held the princedom from 1477 to 1485 and was posthumously honoured as Prince Gongxi of Xichuan (隰川恭僖王)
    - Zhu Chengyun (朱成钧; d. 1494), Zhu Shisui's first son who held the princedom until 1494 and was posthumously honoured as Prince Zhuangyin of Xichuan (隰川庄隐王)
      - Zhu Congyang (朱聪羕; d. 1518), Zhu Chengyun's first son who held the princedom from 1494 to 1518 and was posthumously honoured as Prince Kangsu of Xichuan (隰川康肃王)
        - Zhu Junbai (朱俊柏; d. 1555), Zhu Congyang's first son who held the princedom from 1522 to 1555 and was posthumously honoured as Prince Zhuanghui of Xichuan (隰川庄惠王). After extinction of his line, the peerage was abolished
      - Zhu CongX (朱聪X)
        - Zhu Junsui (朱俊檖; d. 1576), Zhu Junbai's successor who managed the princedom as clan councillor from 1558 to 1576
          - Zhu Chongyi (朱充[鱼日欸]), Zhu Junsui's first son who managed the princedom as clan councillor from 1617
            - Zhu Tingyu (朱廷[土羽]), Zhu Chongyi's first son who managed the princedom as clan councillor until 1646
      - Zhu Congying (朱聪㵬)
        - Zhu Jungeng (朱俊梗; d. 1590), Zhu Congying's son and Zhu Junbai's successor who managed the princedom 1578 to 1590
          - Zhu Chongdan (朱充倓; d. 1615), Zhu Jungeng's first son who managed the princedom from 1591 to 1615 as clan councillor
    - Zhu Chenghao (朱成镐), Zhu Shisui's second son who managed the princedom since 1488 as clan councillor
  - Zhu Shikuang (朱仕圹), Zhu Xunliu's second son who managed the princedom affairs from 1485 to 1488 as clan councillor

=== Prince of Changhua ===
- Zhu Shitan (朱仕墰; 15 March 1416 - 21 March 1484), Zhu Xuntuan's second son who held the princedom from 1448 to 1484 and was posthumously honoured as Prince Wenxian of Changhua (昌化温宪王)
  - Zhu Chenghuan (朱成锾; 1448 -14 February 1513), Zhu Shitan's first son who held the princedom from 1487 to 1513 and was posthumously honoured as Prince Rongxi of Changhua (昌化荣僖王)
    - Zhu Congjin (朱聪浕; 1472-1541), Zhu Chenghuan's first son who held the princedom from 1518 to 1542 and was posthumously honoured as Prince Duanxiang of Changhua (昌化端襄王). As he was heirless, his princedom was expired

=== Prince of Ding'an ===
The peerage was created in 1450 for Zhu Chenglin with the fief in Xinzhou

- Zhu Chenglin (朱成鏻)

With his heir Zhu Congyu was disinherited, the princedom was abolished.

== Expired cadet lines ==
=== Absorbed to the princedom ===
- Prince of Wuyi (武邑王) - abolished with the death of Zhu Congmo and absorbed to the princedom with ascension of Zhu Junzhang (朱俊杖)
- Prince of Taishun (泰順王) - with the ascension of Zhu Chongyao

=== Extinct ===
- Prince of Changhua (昌化王)
- Prince of Hechuan (和川王)
- Prince of Ningjin (寧津王)
- Prince of Liyang (溧陽王)
- Prince of Jinxian (進賢王)
- Prince of Henei (河内王)
- Prince of Baofeng (寶豐王)
- Prince of Dangshan (碭山王)
- Prince of Taixing (泰興王)
- Prince of Taiping (太平王)
- Prince of Xinning (新寧王)

=== Abolished ===
- Prince of Ding'an (定安王)
- Prince of Boye (博野王)
- Prince of Raoyang (饒陽王)
