= Qi Tai =

Chinese official (d. 1402)

Qi Tai (simplified Chinese: 齐泰; traditional Chinese: 齊泰) (died 1402), originally named De (德) and was given the name Tai by the Hongwu Emperor, courtesy name Shangli (尚禮), art name Nantang (南塘), a native of Lishui County, Zhili (present-day Lishui District, Nanjing, Jiangsu), was a Chinese official of the early Ming dynasty.

Qi Tai became jieyuan in 1384 and jinshi in 1388 during the Hongwu era. He successively served as Secretary of the Ministries of Rites and War, Director, and Left Vice Minister of War. On his deathbed, the Hongwu Emperor appointed Qi Tai as one of the ministers to assist in governing and ruling the new emperor. After the Jianwen Emperor ascended the throne, he was promoted to Minister of War, and he and Huang Zicheng proposed reducing the power of princes. As a result, Prince of Yan Zhu Di launched the Jingnan campaign. In 1402, after Zhu Di seized the throne, he arrested and executed Qi Tai. During the Qing Qianlong era, the Qianlong Emperor rehabilitated the ministers of the Jianwen Emperor, and Qi Tai was given the posthumous name Zhongjing (忠敬).

== See also ==
- Huang Zicheng
- Fang Xiaoru
