= Geng Bingwen =

Geng Bingwen (Chinese: 耿炳文; pinyin: Gěng Bǐngwén; 1334–1403), a native of Hao Prefecture (present-day Fengyang, Anhui) was a Ming dynasty general. He participated in the Jingnan Campaign on the side of the Jianwen Emperor. After the Prince of Yan Zhu Di ascended the throne, he committed suicide.
