= Huang Zicheng =

Chinese official (1350–1402)

- 黃子澄
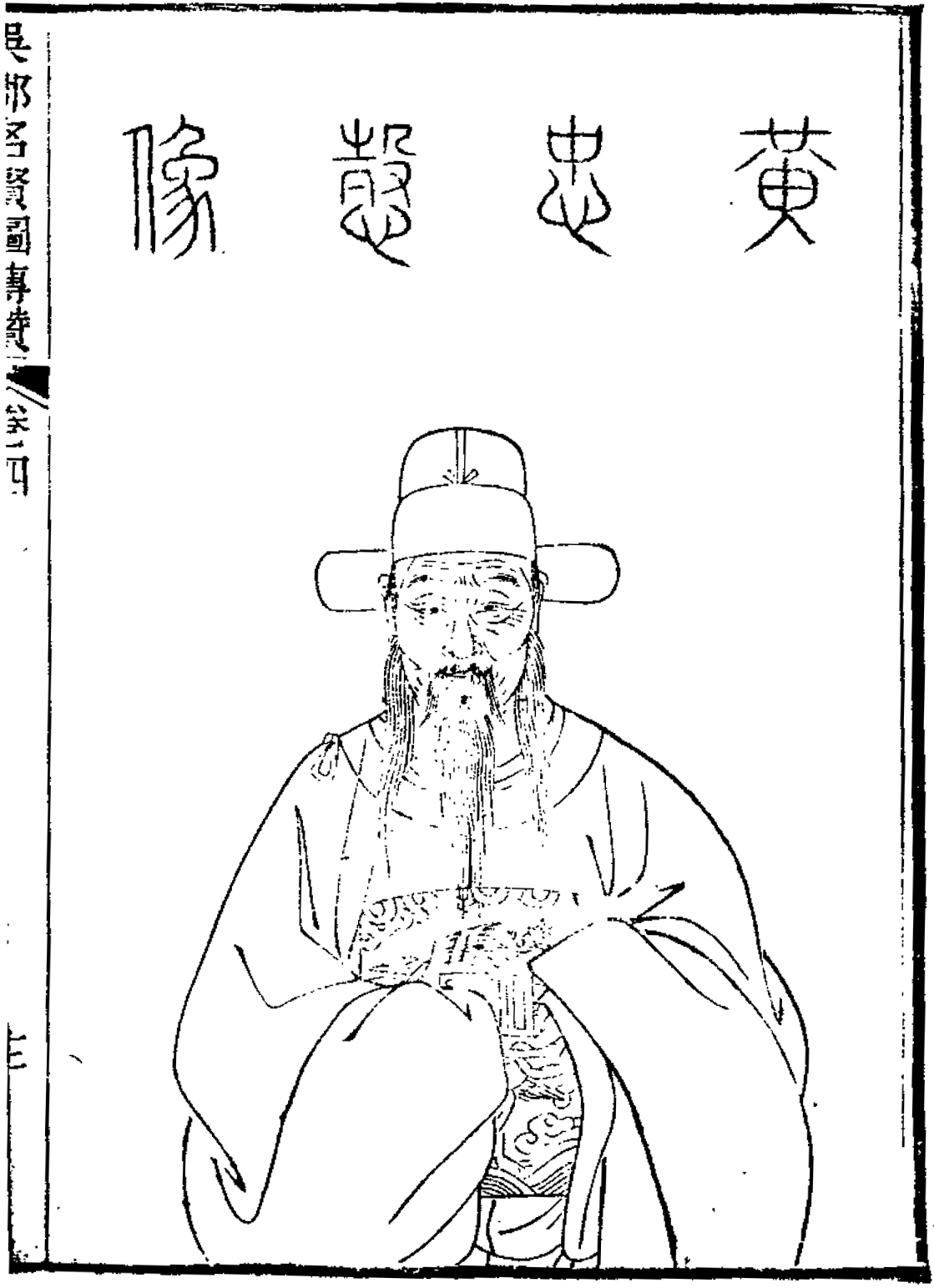

Hanlin Chancellor
- In office 1397–1398
- Preceded by: Liu Sanwu
- Succeeded by: Dong Lun

Personal details
- Born: 1350
- Died: 1402 (aged 51–52) Nanjing
- Education: jinshi degree (1385)
- Birth name: Huang Shi (Note: simplified Chinese: 黄湜; traditional Chinese: 黃湜; pinyin: Huáng Shí)
- Courtesy name: Zicheng

Chinese name
- Traditional Chinese: 黃子澄
- Simplified Chinese: 黄子澄
Transcriptions
Standard Mandarin
- Hanyu Pinyin: Huáng Zǐchéng

Huang Shi (1350–1402), courtesy name Zicheng, better known as Huang Zicheng, was a Chinese official of the early Ming dynasty, who rose to the position of Hanlin Chancellor.

Huang Zicheng got first place in the metropolitan examination in 1385, during the reign of the Hongwu Emperor. He successively served as Junior Historiography Compiler (編修), Senior Historiography Compiler (修撰), Chief Minister of the Court of Imperial Sacrifices (太常寺卿), etc., and Reader-companion for the Heir Apparent (伴讀東宮). After the Jianwen Emperor ascended the throne, he concurrently served as Hanlin Chancellor (翰林學士) and jointly proposed with Qi Tai to reduce the power of princes. As a result, the Prince of Yan Zhu Di launched the Jingnan campaign in 1399, and in 1402, after Zhu Di seized the throne, he arrested and executed Huang Zicheng.

In the early Hongguang era, he was given the posthumous title of Jiemin (節愍); the Qing Qianlong Emperor gave him the posthumous title of Zhongque (忠愨).

Huang Zicheng had a son who changed his name to Tian Jing (田經). He survived and was pardoned during the reign of the Hongxi Emperor. Huang Zicheng had a descendant, Huang Biao (黃表), who passed the imperial examination with the highest rank of jinshi during the reign of the Zhengde Emperor.

== See also ==
- Fang Xiaoru
- Qi Tai
