= Zhu Gui (prince) =

Chinese prince (1374–1446)

Zhu Gui 朱桂

Prince of Dai
- Tenure: 1392–1446
- Successor: Zhu Xuntuan, Prince Li

Prince of Yu
- Tenure: 1378–1392
- Born: 25 August 1374
- Died: 29 December 1446 (aged 72)
Names
- Zhu Gui (朱桂)
Posthumous name
- Prince Jian of Dai (代簡王)
- House: Zhu
- Father: Hongwu Emperor
- Mother: Consort Hui of the Guo clan

Zhu Gui (Chinese: 朱桂; 25 August 1374 – 29 December 1446), initially known by his title as Prince of Yu (豫王), later changed to Prince of Dai (代王), was an imperial prince of the Chinese Ming dynasty. He was the 13th son of the Hongwu Emperor with his concubine, Consort Hui.

== Consorts and issue ==
- Princess Consort of Dai, of the Xu clan (代王妃 徐氏; d. 1427) (Note: She was the second daughter of Xu Da and the sister of Empress Renxiaowen. In 1391, she was made Princess consort of Yu (豫王妃), and the following year, her title was changed to Princess consort of Dai (代王妃), giving birth to Zhu Xuntuan and Zhu Xun? [Prince of Lucheng]. In her later years, she was expelled from the Prince's Mansion and lived with her eldest grandson, Zhu Shi?, and others.)
  - Zhu Xuntuan, Prince Li of Dai (代戾王 朱遜煓; 1393–1418), first son
  - Zhu Xun?, Prince Xishun of Lucheng (潞城僖順王 朱遜𤆼; 1407–1471), third son
- Lady, of the Lü clan (呂氏)
  - Zhu Xunmin, Prince Rongxu of Guangling (廣靈榮虛王 朱遜𤇜; 1402–1459), second son
- Lady, of the Xu clan (徐氏)
  - Zhu Xunchen, Prince Kanghui of Shanyin (山陰康惠 朱遜煁; 1409–1467), fourth son
  - Zhu Xunliao, Prince Jingzhuang of Xuanning (宣寧靖莊王 朱遜炓; 1423–1470), seventh son
  - Zhu Xunhui, Prince Rongding of Huairen (懷仁榮定王 朱遜烠; 1425–1490), eighth son
  - Zhu Xunliu, Prince Yian of Xichuan (隰川懿安王 朱遜熮; 1429–1474), tenth son
- Lady, of the Liu clan (劉氏)
  - Princess Huguan (壶关郡主), sixth daughter
- Unknown
  - Zhu Xuntan, Prince Gongjian of Xiangyuan (襄垣恭簡王 朱遜燂; 1410–1462), fifth son
  - Zhu Xunquan, Prince Rongshun of Lingqiu (靈丘榮順王 朱遜烇; 1410–1462), sixth son
  - Zhu Xunhu (朱遜熩), ninth son
  - Zhu Xunfan (朱遜燔), eleventh son
  - Princess Xingning (乡宁郡主), fourth daughter
  - Princess Baode (保德郡主), seventh daughter

== See also ==
- List of vassals prince peerages of Ming dynasty

Zhu Gui House of Zhu Born: 25 August 1374 Died: 29 December 1446
Chinese royalty
| Preceded by Title created | Prince of Yu; 1378–1392 | Succeeded by None |
| Preceded by Title created | Prince of Dai; 1392–1446 | Succeeded by Zhu Xuntuan, Prince Li |
