= Yao Guangxiao =

Chinese military strategist, statesman and monk (1335–1418)

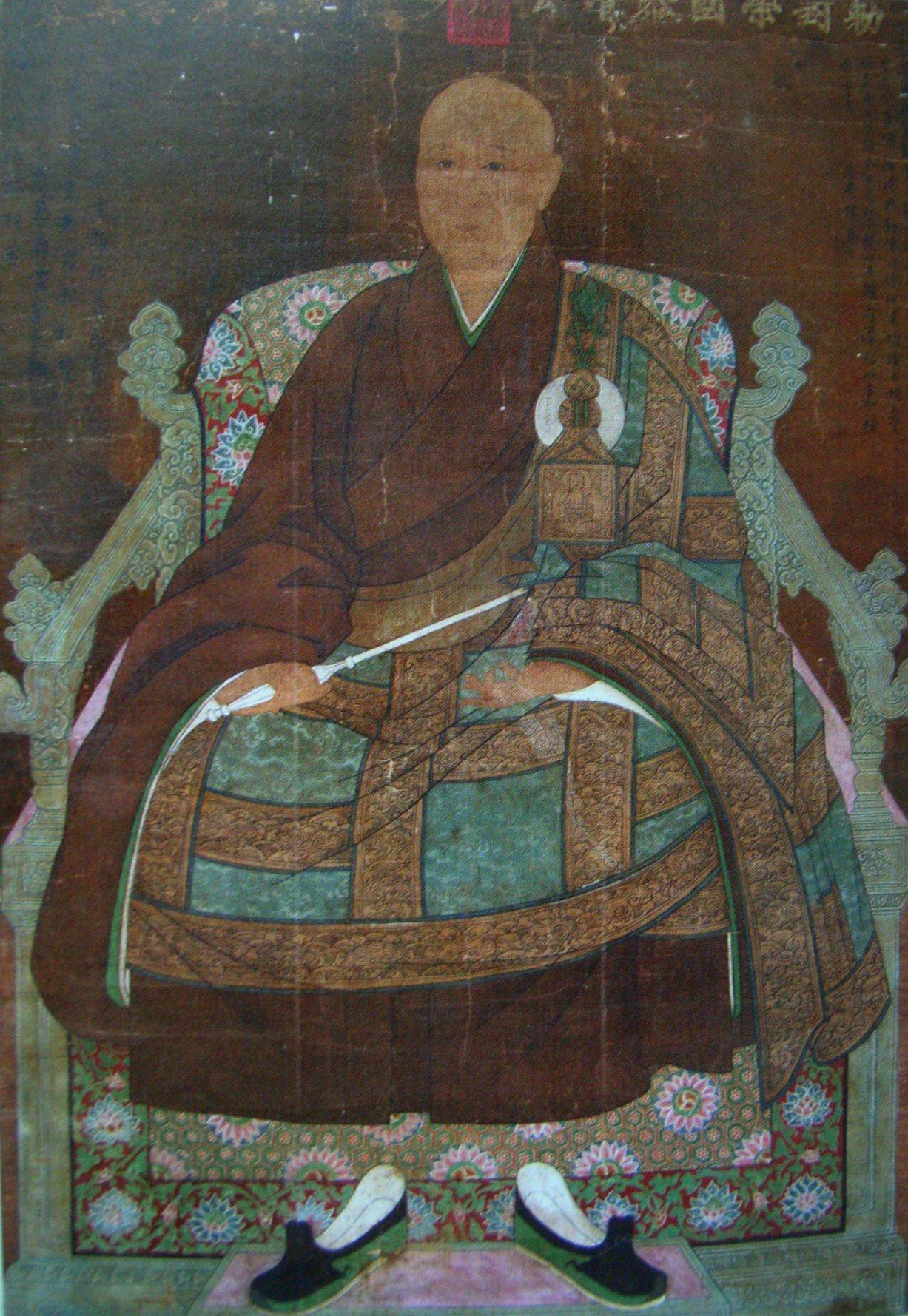
Yao Guangxiao

Yao Guangxiao (姚廣孝, 1335–1418), also known by his dharma name Daoyan (道衍), was a Chinese military strategist, statesman and Chan Buddhist monk who lived in the late Yuan and early Ming dynasties.

Daoyan was born in Changzhou County (today a part of Suzhou, Jiangsu) with ancestral roots in Fuzhou, and was ordained as a bhikkhu (full monk) at the age of fourteen. He studied Buddhist dharma, yin yang and divination. In 1382, he came to Beijing, and was appointed the abbot of Qingshou Temple (慶壽寺). Later, he became a close adviser of the imperial prince Zhu Di, the Prince of Yan.

According to History of Ming, it was Daoyan who suggested a revolt against the Jianwen Emperor after the emperor, a nephew of Zhu Di, started to crack down on the influence of his uncles the imperial princes. Daoyan played an important role in the resulting three-year civil war, the Jingnan Campaign, which resulted in the disappearance of the Jianwen Emperor, and the Prince of Yan becoming the new Yongle Emperor. He was left in Beijing together with Zhu Gaochi to guard the base area. Zhu Di asked him for strategy through letters before important battles. It was Daoyan who suggested driving south to attack Nanjing directly, which made Zhu Di the final victor.

After Zhu Di was crowned the Yongle Emperor, Daoyan was bestowed the name Yao Guangxiao, and granted the title Crown Prince's Preceptor (太子少師). The Yongle Emperor ordered him to return to secular life but he refused. He was then ordered to participate in superintending the recompilation of Taizu Shilu, the imperial annal of the Ming dynasty's founder, the Hongwu Emperor. Later, he was appointed general editor of the Yongle Encyclopedia together with Xie Jin.

Yao died in Qingshou Temple, Beijing, in 1418, and was given the posthumous name Gongjing (恭靖) and made the "Duke of Rong" (榮國公) by the Yongle Emperor. His ashes was buried underneath Yao Guangxiao Pagoda (39.820°N 116.080°E, in modern Changlesi Village, Qinglonghu Town, Fangshan District, Beijing) which has since been named a protected historical site.
