= Jingnan campaign =

1399–1402 civil war in the Ming dynasty

- Map showing the Jingnan campaign
Date	8 August 1399 – 13 July 1402
Location	North China Plain, East China
Result	Yan victory; Yan armies captured Nanjing and seized the Ming government; Disappearance of the Jianwen Emperor; Accession of Zhu Di to the throne as the Yongle Emperor

Belligerents
Princedom of Yan; Princedom of Ning	Ming central government

Commanders and leaders
Zhu Di, Prince of Yan; Zhu Gaochi, Hereditary Prince of Yan; Zhu Gaoxu, Prince of Gaoyang Comm. Zhu Gaosui; Yao Guangxiao; Qiu Fu; Zhu Neng; Zhang Yu †; Zhang Fu; Zheng He; Zhu Quan, Prince of Ning; Three Guards of Doyan	Zhu Yunwen, the Jianwen Emperor (MIA); Geng Bingwen; Tie Xuan (executed); Li Jinglong (surrendered); Xu Huizu; Qi Tai (executed); Huang Zicheng (executed); Fang Xiaoru (executed); Sheng Yong (surrendered)

Chinese name
- Traditional Chinese: 靖難之役
- Simplified Chinese: 靖难之役
Transcriptions
Standard Mandarin
- Hanyu Pinyin: Jìngnàn zhīyì

Jingnan rebellion
- Traditional Chinese: 靖難之變
- Simplified Chinese: 靖难之变
Transcriptions
Standard Mandarin
- Hanyu Pinyin: Jìngnàn zhībiàn

The Jingnan campaign, or the campaign to clear away disorders, was a three-year civil war from 1399 to 1402 in the early years of the Ming dynasty of China between the Jianwen Emperor and his uncle, Zhu Di, Prince of Yan. The war was sparked by the removal of the Emperor's uncles and the restriction of Zhu Di's power by the central government after the Jianwen Emperor ascended to the throne in 1398. In 1399, Zhu Di rebelled under the guise of restoring order and the rights of the princes. After three years of fighting, he successfully conquered the capital of Nanjing in June 1402, while the Emperor and his family were likely killed in the palace fire. This marked the end of the war.

Soon after, Zhu Di ascended to the throne as the third emperor of the Ming dynasty. Upon assuming power, he made efforts to erase the legacy of the Jianwen Emperor by removing his supporters from positions of authority and reversing his reforms. Despite initially rebelling in the name of protecting the rights of the princes, Zhu Di adopted a similar oppressive stance towards them as the Jianwen Emperor and gradually stripped them of their political influence.

== Road to war ==
=== New regime ===
After the death of the Hongwu Emperor, the first emperor of China's Ming dynasty, in 1398, his grandson Zhu Yunwen ascended the throne as the Jianwen Emperor. At the age of fifteen, Zhu Yunwen became the heir to the throne in 1392 following the death of his father, Zhu Biao, who was the eldest son of the Hongwu Emperor.

The new emperor inherited his father's moderate character. He expressed the style and goals of the government by choosing the name of his era, "the Establishment of Civil Virtue" (Jianwen). Instead of relying on deserving generals or princes from the imperial family, he chose to surround himself with Confucian scholars. His closest advisers were Huang Zicheng, Qi Tai, and Fang Xiaoru, idealistic scholars committed to reform but lacking practical experience in managing the country.

=== "Reducing the feudatories" policy ===
The Jianwen Emperor ascended to the throne of the Ming dynasty at the young age of twenty-one, much younger than his uncles who were the sons of the Hongwu Emperor. His uncles were granted the titles of princes (wang) and were given significant income and privileges by their father. They were stationed in various provinces and had command of three to fifteen thousand men at their disposal.

The new government sought to limit the power of the Emperor's uncles. This policy, known as "reducing the feudatories" (削藩; xuefan), was advocated by Qi and Huang, who cited past dynasties such as the Han dynasty where the Rebellion of the Seven States had occurred. The government prohibited the princes from participating in public affairs. In 1398–1399, several of the Jianwen Emperor's uncles, including Zhu Su, Prince of Zhou; Zhu Gui, Prince of Dai; Zhu Bo (朱柏), Prince of Xiang; Zhu Fu (朱榑), Prince of Qi, and Zhu Pian (朱楩), Prince of Min, were removed from their positions due to both real and perceived crimes. They were either exiled, placed under house arrest, or forced to commit suicide.

The most dangerous prince was Zhu Di, Prince of Yan, who was the oldest and most influential of the Hongwu Emperor's surviving sons. He was based in Beijing, and during the campaigns against the Mongols, he proved himself to be a capable military leader and an energetic administrator. Despite not being named as a successor in 1392, he considered himself unjustly neglected.

=== Prince of Yan's rebellion ===
Portrait of Zhu Di, the future Yongle Emperor

Zhu Di was the obvious next target, but the government was cautious towards him, giving him time to prepare and gather forces. In the meantime, he asked for mercy for his close friend Zhu Su and begged for the restoration of their broken relationship. He refrained from openly hostile actions because his three sons had been residing at the Nanjing court since the funeral of the Hongwu Emperor, effectively holding them as hostages. The Emperor considered granting his pleas, supported by Qi, but Huang demanded forceful action. The Emperor hesitated to respond to Zhu Di's requests while also systematically reducing his uncle's power. He recalled the 15,000 men under his command to Kaiping, north of the Great Wall. Generals serving in northeast China, close to Zhu Di, were gradually replaced by loyal followers of the emperor. (Note: Two guard units, located in Yongping south of Beijing, were redeployed due to their close ties with Zhu Di. Additionally, Xu Kai was assigned to guard Linqing on the Grand Canal, while Geng Huan was appointed in Shanhai Pass, both of whom remained loyal to the Nanjing government.)

Zhu Di requested the return of his sons, but Qi advised keeping them as hostages. Huang convinced the Emperor that releasing them would help calm the situation. In June 1399, the Emperor allowed the sons to return to Beijing, which ultimately proved to be a grave mistake.

It was not long before war broke out. The immediate cause was the arrest of two of Zhu Di's lower officials on 6 August 1399, for alleged "subversive activity". Zhu Di, with the support of provincial dignitaries in Beijing, (Note: Li Youzhi, Beiping surveillance commissioner, and Zhang Xin (張信), Beiping regional military commissioner.) took control of Beijing and its surrounding counties and prefectures. By 9 August, his troops had already advanced to Jizhou and occupied the Juyong Pass northwest of Beijing. They also successfully thwarted Song Zhong's attempt to recapture the pass from Kaiping, ultimately defeating and killing him at Huailai. Many of the general's soldiers defected to Zhu Di's side, having previously served under him.

Zhu Di justified his actions by claiming that he needed to punish treacherous court officials. He referred to this as the Jingnan campaign, a campaign to clear away disorders, and defended his actions in letters sent to the court in August and December 1399, as well as in a public statement. In these communications, he stated that he had taken action to put an end to internal political disorder and confusion, to uphold the Hongwu Emperor's statutes and laws defining the duties of princes, and that he was motivated by respect for his late father. He accused the emperor and his entourage of withholding information about his father's illness and preventing him from attending the funeral. Additionally, he accused the emperor and his ministers of persecuting the princes, who were falsely accused of planning an uprising. He claimed that his actions were a reasonable form of self-defense, not directed towards the emperor, but towards his treacherous and criminal ministers. He also asserted that he had no interest in the throne, but as the eldest living son of the deceased emperor and Empress Ma, he was obligated to restore the law and legality that had been subverted by the new government.

== Civil war ==
=== 1399 ===
At the onset of the war, Zhu Di commanded a force of 100,000 soldiers and held authority only within his fief in Beijing. In contrast, the Nanjing government had three times the number of troops and significantly more resources, but its superiority was not as clear-cut as it seemed. Zhu Di was a decisive and exceptionally capable commander, leading an elite group of Ming soldiers, including a large contingent of Mongolian cavalry. On the other hand, the imperial party was weakened by the indecisiveness and poor coordination of its commanders, and by the court's focus on administrative reorganization rather than the urgent demands of the war.

The war officially began in August 1399 when the Emperor appointed Marquis Geng Bingwen (c. 1339–1404), a retired and experienced general, as the commander of the troops tasked with suppressing the rebellion. In an attempt to defeat the rebels near Beijing, Geng marched on 11 September 1399 with 130,000 soldiers to Zhending, a city southwest of Beijing. Two weeks later, he suffered a defeat north of the city with heavy losses. Zhu Di then besieged him in Zhending for three days, but was unable to conquer the well-fortified city and eventually retreated. The court replaced Geng with Li Jinglong, (Note: Li Jinglong was the eldest son of Li Wenzhong, a prominent general of the Hongwu Emperor. He did not have any military merits, but inherited his position from his father.) but the new commander did not improve the management of the troops. Instead of launching offensive actions, he waited and gathered troops in an attempt to later crush the enemy with numerical superiority.

In mid-October, Zhu Di left Beijing to recruit new soldiers, leaving the city under the control of his eldest son Zhu Gaochi. Li saw this as an opportunity and marched against Beijing with a new army, besieging the city on 12 November. Meanwhile, Zhu Di had secured his power in the northeast by subjugating Zhu Quan, Prince of Ning, who was based at Daning north of the Great Wall. He also recruited three guard units of Mongol cavalry, giving him a total of 80,000 troops. He quickly returned to Beijing and on 2 December, he surprised the besiegers by attacking their camp. At the same time, Zhu Gaochi set out to attack from within the city. The government's army, taken aback by the sudden attack and suffering from the cold, retreated first to Zhending and then to Dezhou in Shandong. In December 1399, Zhu Di issued another proclamation accusing the Emperor's associates, Qi and Huang, of crimes. The Emperor then removed them from office, but continued to consult with them.

=== 1400 ===
In January 1400, Zhu Di launched an offensive in Shanxi, advancing towards Datong at its northern tip. Li, however, did not react until March, when Zhu Di had already left Datong and returned to Dezhou. This delay resulted in many soldiers from the south perishing due to exhaustion from the long march and harsh weather conditions.

In May, the two armies, consisting of a total of 600,000 soldiers, engaged in the battle of Baoding in central Beiping. Li attempted to outflank the enemy, but the maneuver was hindered by heavy rains and floods. The government army suffered significant casualties and was forced to retreat in disarray to Dezhou on 30 May, and then continued south to Jinan. Zhu Di then faced a threat from a government cavalry raid led by Ping An (平安), but were ultimately saved by the arrival of reinforcements led by Zhu Gaoxu, his son.

In early June, Zhu Di launched an offensive by marching on Dezhou and was successful in crushing Li's exhausted troops in front of the city and occupying it. He then advanced to Jinan and began besieging it on 8 June. The city was defended by Ping and Sheng Yong (盛庸), two capable generals serving the government, with the support of Shandong governor Tie Xuan. Under their leadership, several successful sorties were organized against the enemy's advance. When news arrived of a relief army being sent from Nanjing, Zhu Di broke the siege and retreated to Beijing on 4 September. Government troops were able to reclaim Dezhou and other territories lost in 1400.

The Emperor then dismissed Li and appointed Sheng, who had been promoted to marquis, as the new "commander-in-chief for the pacification of the rebel forces". Tie was also appointed as the Minister of War. From the autumn of 1400, Zhu Di, influenced by information from eunuchs and other supporters remaining at the Nanjing court, focused on a war of attrition. He sent his troops on raids to disrupt communications and destroy enemy supplies in southern Beiping and western Shandong.

=== 1401 ===
On 9 and 10 January, the government army successfully defeated the rebels who were attacking Dongchang, a city located on the Grand Canal in Liaocheng prefecture. Sheng's army used firearms and rocket weapons to kill tens of thousands of Zhu Di's soldiers. As they retreated to Beijing, Zhu Di narrowly avoided being captured by Ping's cavalry. The Emperor, encouraged by this triumph, once again appointed Qi and Huang to their previous positions on 31 January.

In an attempt to gain control over the southern region of Beiping province, Zhu Di launched a new offensive in late February. On 5 and 6 April, Sheng was defeated at Jiahe (located north of the Hutuo River near Dezhou). The rebels were aided by a storm from the northeast, which hindered the government troops. According to folk legend, the storm was summoned by Taoist monks advising Zhu Di. However, Zhu Di was unable to capture Dezhou, where the government army had retreated to. On 27 April, he defeated Ping's cavalry at Gaocheng and forced them to withdraw to Zhending. Once again, the city resisted the attempt to capture it. On 17 April, the Emperor dismissed Qi and Huang and replaced the latter with Ru Chang (茹瑺), who became the leader of the peace party at court along with Li. Ru and Li proposed peace talks to Zhu Di, but were rejected. Despite their dismissal, Qi and Huang still held the Emperor's trust and continued to oversee military operations in the Yangtze basin.

In the summer, the rebels continued to raid the government's supply lines in southern Beiping and Shandong. In July 1401, Sheng attempted to cut the rebel supply lines along the Grand Canal, but was unsuccessful, leaving government troops in northern Shandong in a dire situation. In August, Ping launched an offensive from Zhending toward Beijing, initially forcing Zhu Di's rebel forces to retreat northward. By October, the rebels had regrouped and counterattacked, driving the imperial troops back south.

The Ming court's leadership changes during the war revealed a cyclical pattern tied to military fortunes. Qi and Huang regained influence during periods of battlefield success, only to be removed when setbacks occurred. These shifts exposed significant political divisions at the highest levels of government, extending beyond mere symbolic concessions to Zhu Di. While the Jianwen Emperor periodically explored diplomatic solutions, he continued to rely on his core advisors, tasking them with organizing regional militia forces in the Yangtze valley to bolster imperial defenses.

=== 1402 ===
On 15 January 1402, Zhu Di launched a new offensive. Based on the counsel of sympathetic Nanjing eunuchs, he chose not to advance through the fortified cities along the Grand Canal, as he had done in previous years. Instead, he headed west where the government forces were weaker. He passed through Baoding and Zhending, bypassing Dezhou, and crossed the Yellow River. Within a month, he had captured several crucial strongholds in northwestern Shandong, effectively disrupting the government troops' lines.

The government sent Xu Huizu (徐輝祖), (Note: Despite the defeat of the Jianwen Emperor and the ascension of Zhu Di to the imperial throne, Xu Huizu was not executed due to the privilege granted to his father, Xu Da, which granted his sons immunity from the death penalty. Instead, he was stripped of his ducal title and placed under house arrest.) the eldest son of Xu Da, to strengthen the defense with new forces, but even he was unable to halt the rebel advance. The rebels continued to push southward, and on 3 March, they captured Xuzhou in the northern part of Zhili. The government was forced to withdraw its troops from Beiping province and the city of Dezhou in order to defend Zhili.

In April 1402, the rebel army moved to Suzhou, located in northern Anhui (at that time part of Zhili). They defeated Ping's cavalry, who attempted to stop them, but on 23 May, they suffered a defeat at the hands of Xu on Mount Qimei. The Emperor's sudden dismissal of Xu unsettled the army and ruined their chance for a turnaround in the battle. Just five days later, Zhu Di took advantage of Xu's recall and surprised and captured Ping and other generals at Lingbi. On 7 June, the rebels overcame Sheng's defenses on the Huai River and bypassed the heavily fortified cities of Fengyang (on the Huai River) and Huai'an (on the Grand Canal). They then captured Yangzhou on 17 June, but their advance was halted on 1 July by Sheng's fleet at Pukou on the Yangtze River. Two days later, the fleet commander Chen Xuan (陳瑄; 1365–1433) defected to the rebels. This allowed them to cross the river and have an open road to Nanjing.

The Jianwen Emperor had previously called upon armies from the north and was currently recruiting new soldiers to protect the capital. With 200,000 troops stationed in Nanjing and its surrounding areas, Zhu Di cautiously approached the heavily fortified city, carefully weighing his options. However, the Emperor's entourage was divided. Qi and Huang, who were once again called upon, advocated for the defense of the capital at all costs. On the other hand, Li and Ru Chang wanted to negotiate. On 9 July, the Emperor sent Li and Zhu Hui (朱橞), Prince of Gu, the 17th son of the Hongwu Emperor, to the enemy's camp with a peace offer, but the negotiators returned with the news that Zhu Di had refused negotiations. It was later discovered that they had secretly negotiated an end to the war without the Emperor's knowledge.

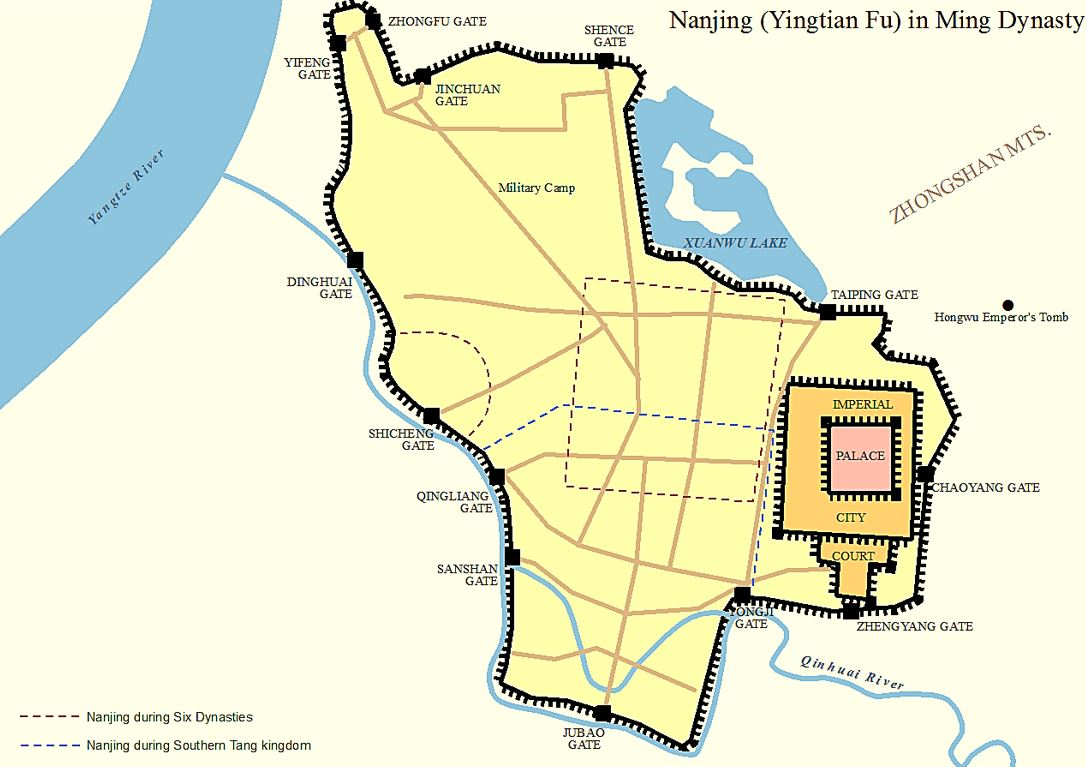
Map of Nanjing during the Ming dynasty marking Jinchuan Gate, where defectors Li Jinglong and Zhu Hui surrendered the city to Zhu Di's Yan forces—a decisive moment in the Jingnan campaign

Five days later, on 13 July, Li Jinglong and Zhu Hui, who was in charge of defending Nanjing's Jinchuan Gate, opened the gates of Nanjing to the rebels. This allowed them to enter the city without any resistance. During the resulting conflicts, the imperial palace was set on fire. After the flames were extinguished, three charred bodies were discovered and identified as those of the Emperor, the Empress, and their eldest son.

== Aftermath ==
On 17 July, Zhu Di ascended the imperial throne as the successor of the Hongwu Emperor and adopted the era name Yongle, which means "perpetual happiness". He denied the legitimacy of his overthrown nephew, abolished his reforms, and attempted to erase them from history entirely. In addition, he retroactively abolished the Jianwen era and extended the Hongwu era until the end of 1402. The government archives, with the exception of financial and military documents, were burned.

After the Yongle Emperor ascended to the throne, a large-scale purge of the state administration took place. This purge was, to some extent, inevitable due to Confucian morality, which did not allow the Jianwen Emperor's staunchest followers to recognize the usurper. They were ordered to follow their master, including their clients and household members. The case of Fang serves as an illustration. Initially, Zhu Di had no intention of killing him and even made a promise to his mentor Dao Yan that he would not harm him, but after the capture of Nanjing, Fang was paraded and offered a position in the civil service. Fang, however, accused Zhu Di of rebellion and demanded the installation of the Jianwen Emperor's son as the new emperor. Zhu Di allegedly ordered Fang to write a proclamation announcing the accession of the new emperor, but Fang refused, stating that he would rather die than serve a usurper. Fang was later seen as an example of a loyal servant who remained faithful to his master under all circumstances. Another example is Liu Jing (1340–1402), son of Liu Ji, a brilliant scholar and official who also refused to serve the new regime. He even pointed out to the Emperor that even after a hundred generations, he would still be known as a "usurper". Liu died in prison. Even Huang, in an audience before the Emperor, condemned the rebellion. When asked if he could be charged with a crime, he replied:

Why don't you charge me as a close advisor to the deceased emperor who failed to advise him to deprive you of your princely powers early enough, consequently allowing you to become so fierce and cruel.

—

Qi and other followers of the Jianwen Emperor were executed, along with a large number of their family members, teachers, students, and supporters. Many others were imprisoned or deported to the border. This widespread purge impacted tens of thousands of individuals.

The Yongle Emperor justified his rebellion by claiming to defend the rights of the princes. After taking the throne, he restored the titles of the princes of Zhou, Qi, and Min, but without granting them the same power as before. However, in the latter half of his reign, the Yongle Emperor began to treat the princes in the same manner as the Jianwen Emperor, whom he had condemned. He removed bodyguards from almost all of them and accused several of his own brothers of criminal acts, punishing them accordingly. By the end of the Yongle Emperor's reign, the princes had lost their political significance.
