= Zhang Yu (general) =

Ming dynasty general (1343–1401)

Zhang Yu (Chinese: 張玉) (1343 – January 9, 1401), courtesy name Shimei (Chinese: 世美), was a Ming dynasty general. He was born in Kaifeng, Henan Province. He supported Zhu Di Prince of Yan (the future Yongle Emperor) in the Jingnan campaign against the Jianwen Emperor. In December 1398, he gathered a force of 800 of Zhu Di's supporters to protect the Prince of Yan's residence in Beiping. On December 25, 1400, Zhang and Zhu arrived in Dongchang (modern Liaocheng, Shandong Province). Two weeks later, he was killed in action against Jianwen's forces led by Sheng Yong, while trying to break Zhu out of an encirclement that they had been lured into.
