= Li Jinglong =

Ming general (1369–1424)

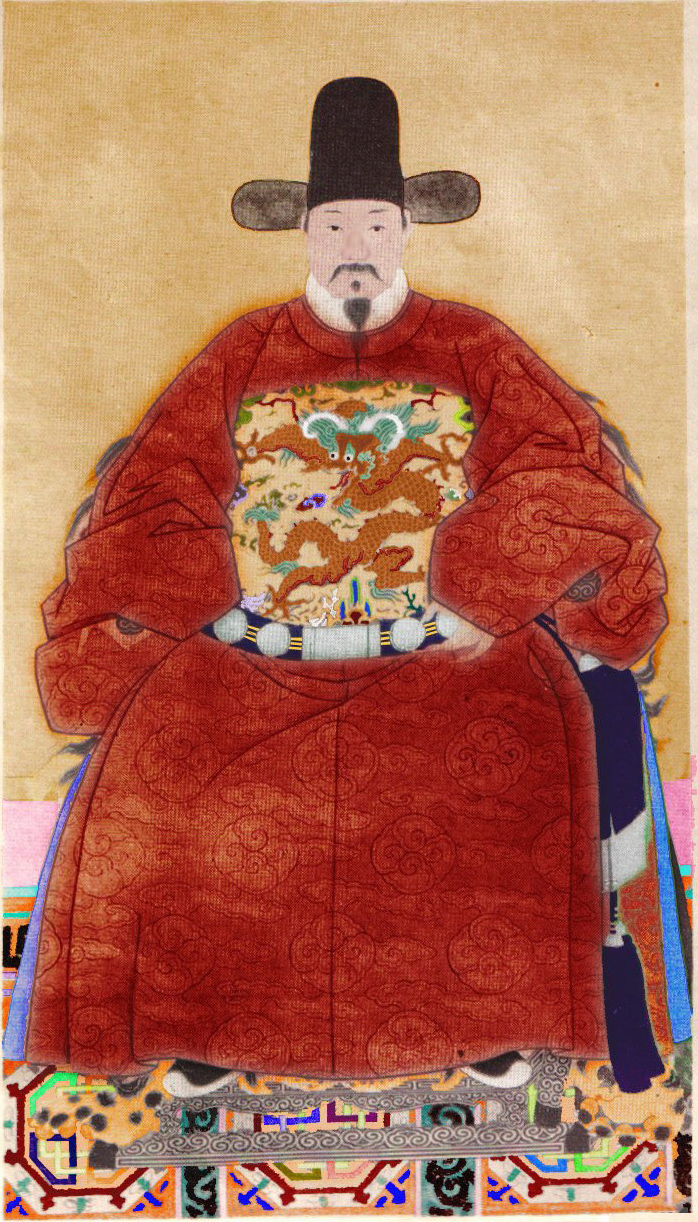
Portrait of Li Jinglong

Li Jinglong (Chinese: 李景隆) (1369–1424), small name Jiujiang (九江), formally the Duke of Cao (曹國公) was a Ming dynasty general. He was the son of Duke Li Wenzhong, the nephew of Zhu Yuanzhang (Hongwu Emperor) through his older sister. During the Jingnan campaign, Li Jinglong initially supported the Jianwen Emperor. However, he lost several battles and was replaced. Li plotted to betray the Jianwen Emperor and later switched sides to support Zhu Di (later the Yongle Emperor). However, Li was then convicted of corruption and treason and thrown in prison by the Yongle Emperor. Li's family members were also arrested.

== Historical records ==
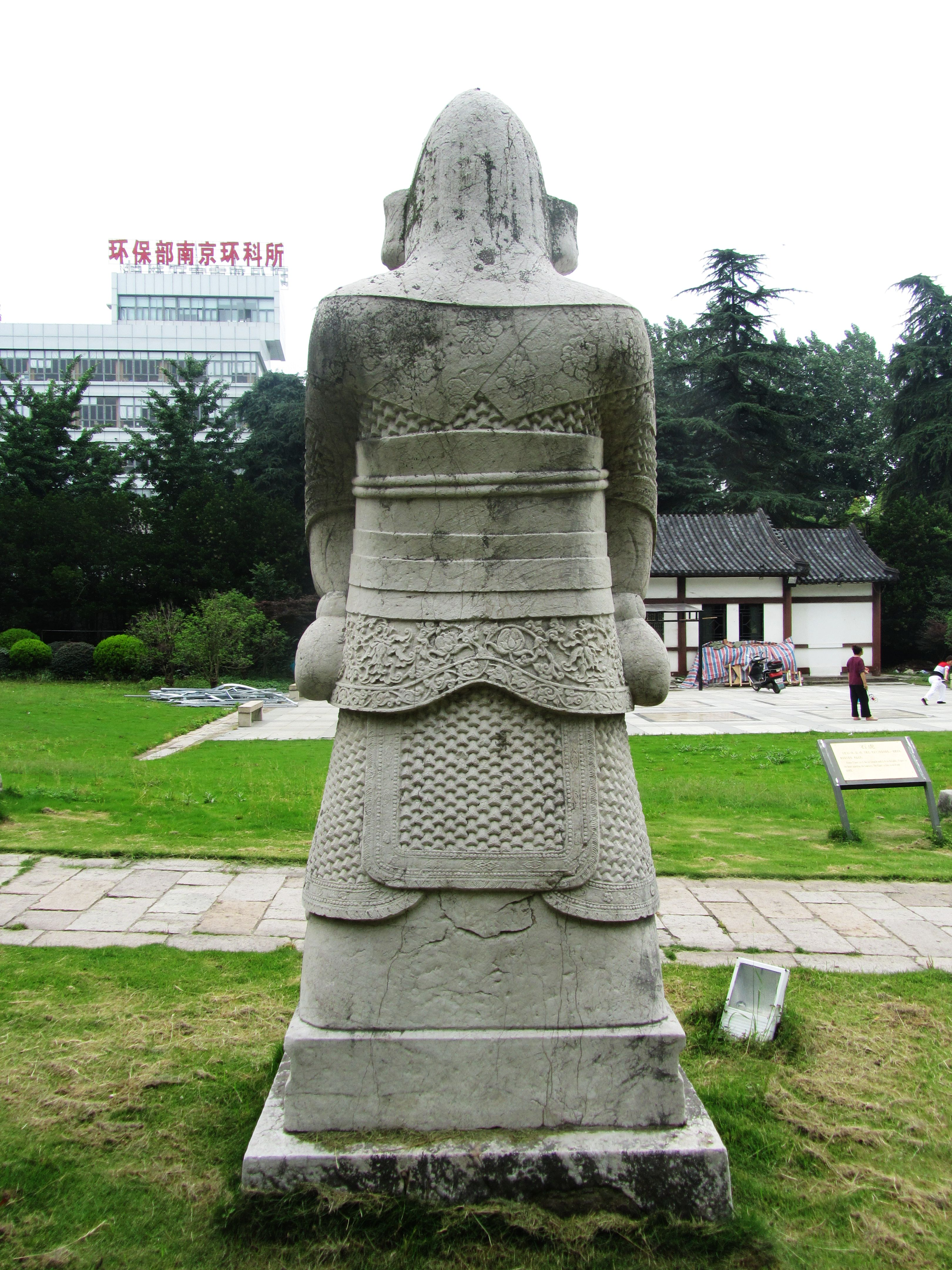
Back of a tomb guardian statue at the tomb of Li Wenzhong

During the Jingnan campaign, he supported the Jianwen Emperor against the Prince of Yan (the later Yongle Emperor). An account cited how Jinglong besieged Beiping and face the Prince of Yan's wife, who mobilized other women to assist in the city's defense. The Jianwen Emperor appeared to favor him, choosing to reinstate the general even after his losses to the Yongle Emperor's army. After a string of defeats, the emperor finally replaced him with Sheng Yong (盛庸).

Li Jinglong surrendered to the Prince of Yan, and it was reported that he conspired with Prince Gu to betray the Jianwen Emperor by opening the gates to Nanjing when the enemy's army arrived in July 1402.

However, during the Yongle Emperor's reign, Li Jinglong was convicted of corruption and treason. Zhu Su, Prince of Zhou, exposed that Li had accepted bribes, and Zheng Ci (鄭賜), minister of punishment, accused Li of treason. Later, Zhu Neng (朱能) showed further evidence to impeach Li Jinglong and his brother Li Zengzhi (李增枝) of treason. The Yongle Emperor then imprisoned Li Jinglong and stripped him of his title. Furthermore, the emperor put Li Jinglong's brother Li Zengzhi, his wife and children, and dozens of his other family members under house arrest and their homes were searched with their property confiscated. Li Jinglong then died in the last years of the Yongle Emperor's reign.
