= Princes of the Ming dynasty =

Chinese princes

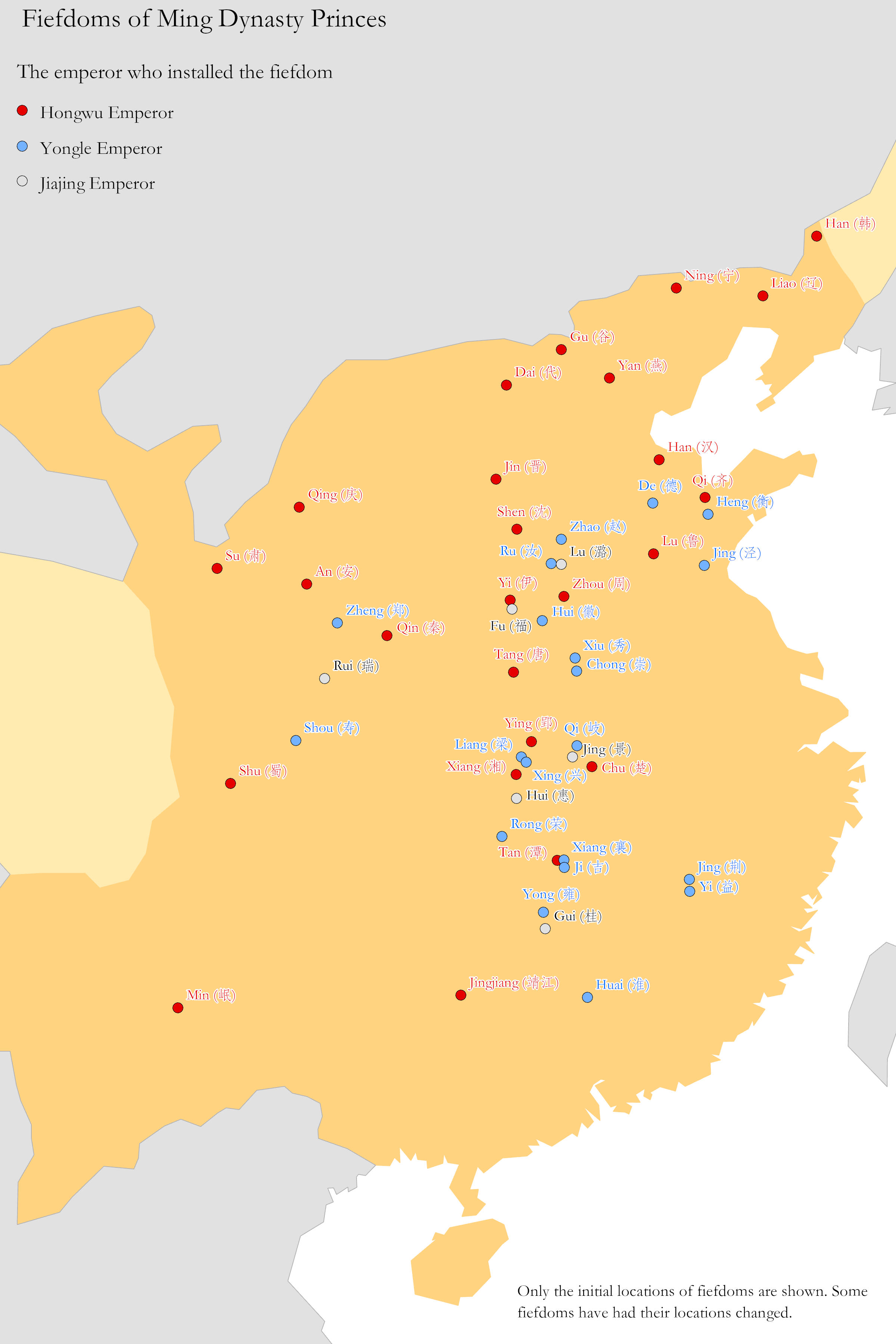
Locations of fiefdoms of Ming princes

The princes of the Ming dynasty were titled and salaried members of the imperial bureaucracy with nominal lordship over various fiefs of Ming China. All were members of the imperial Zhu clan descended from the twenty-six sons of Zhu Yuanzhang (Hongwu Emperor). None of the princes controlled the administration of their nominal fief, unlike some tribal leaders or Confucius' descendants, the Dukes of Overflowing Sagacity, who continued to rule their territories outside of the normal provincial system.

Like all members of the imperial family, the princes were not bound by the standard imperial administration or courts. Instead, their status, promotions, and punishments were regulated by the Imperial Clan Court in the capital, which was staffed and directed by other members of the clan.

== Generation names ==
The Hongwu Emperor considered that the names of descendants would be duplicated. Zhu Shouqian had given generation name poems to all of his sons and grandnephews. They each have poems with twenty characters for twenty generations of male-line descendants, starting from his great-grandnephew, Zhu Shouqian. The emperor decried that his descendant's given names must use characters with Wu Xing (Wood, Fire, Earth, Metal & Water). Only descendants of Zhu Shouqian's line do not need to follow this rule.

== Title ==
The Chinese title of these lords was Wáng (王), which was held by the "emperors" of the Shang and Zhou dynasties and by the "kings" of the Warring States. The English translation of "prince" is generally preferred for these Ming rulers, however, owing to their extremely limited authority.

=== Royal and noble ranks of the Ming dynasty ===
==== Male members ====
- Crown prince, Great Imperial Son (皇太子, Huang Taizi), for eldest son and heir of an Emperor.
  - Crown prince, Great Imperial Grandson (皇太孙), for the eldest son of a crown prince.
- First-rank Prince (亲王), for imperial son except the crown prince.
  - Hereditary Prince, Princely Son (世子), for the eldest son and heir apparent of a 1st rank prince.
    - Hereditary Prince, Princely Grandson (世孙), for the eldest son of a hereditary prince.

Some princes had passed their principalities to their great-grandson too, their heir-apparent namely called "shizengsun" (世曾孙, Princely Great-Grandson).

- Second-rank commandery prince (or "Prince of XXX Commanders"), for all other sons of a crown prince and first-rank prince except their heir apparent.
  - Commandery chief son (郡长子), for the eldest son and heir apparent of a commandery prince.
    - Commandery chief grandson (郡长孙), for the eldest son of a chief son.
- Defender general (镇国将军), for all other sons of a second-rank commandery prince except his heir apparent. The privilege of this title was the same as first junior-rank officers.
- Bulwark general (辅国将军), for the son of a defender general. The privilege was the same as second junior-rank officers.

Some younger sons of commandery princes were mothered by their concubinage, or if they have offended, they would be made the title bulwark general.

- Supporter General (奉國將軍), for the son of a bulwark general. The privilege was the same as third junior-rank officers.
- Defender lieutenant (鎮國中尉), for the son of a supporter general. The privilege was the same as fourth junior-rank officers.
  - Defender lieutenant's primary consort would title reverent lady (恭人).
- Bulwark lieutenant (輔國中尉), for the son of a defender lieutenant. The privilege was the same as fifth junior-rank officers.
  - Bulwark lieutenant's primary consort would title proper lady (宜人).
- Supporter lieutenant (奉國中尉), for the son of a bulwark lieutenant. The privilege was the same as sixth junior-rank officers.
  - Supporter lieutenant's primary consort would title peace lady (安人).

Son of a supporter lieutenant would be made the title of supporter lieutenant.

==== Female members ====
- Princess (公主), for daughters, sisters, and paternal aunts of emperors.
  - Prince Consort Commander (駙馬都尉), for the imperial son-in-law, and consorts to an emperor's sister or paternal aunt
- Commandery princess (郡主), for the daughter of a crown prince or first-rank prince.
- County princess (縣主), for the daughter of a commandery prince.
- Commandery lady (郡君), for the daughter of a defender general.
- County lady (縣君), for the daughter of a bulwark general.
- Village lady (鄉君), for the daughter of a supporter general.
- Clanswoman (宗女), for the daughter of a lieutenant.

Except for imperial daughter and clanswoman, all of the consorts of these female members would be titled "yibin" (儀賓), their ranks apart were the same 1st, 2nd, 3rd, 4th, and 6th junior-rank officials

Offenders imperial member called as Commoner (庶人). If a 1st-rank prince was demoted, the imperial court would appoint one of their peerage members to presided the other members of the peerage, and namely called them as "clan councilor" (宗理).

As the serious population growth of the imperial members during Wanli Emperor's reign, the emperor altered the salaries and restricted the succession orders for imperial members. The new succession order for a first-rank prince was: if a first-rank prince has no son to succeed his principality, a second-rank commandery prince (start from his brother and his brother's descendants, then paternal uncle, and his uncle's descendants, so on and so forth) still could succeed the principal. However, except for the successor's eldest son who would be the new heir for principality, all other younger sons of the successor could not promoted to the rank of second-rank princes even though they are sons of a first-rank prince. They could only held the title of defender general based on their father's original second-princely title designation.

== History ==
During the Hongwu era at the founding of the dynasty, the emperor enfeoffed his many sons and gave them control over large garrisons of as many as 20,000 men. In the succeeding Jianwen era, an attempt by the emperor to demote or disarm his many powerful uncles (known in Chinese as 削蕃, lit. "The Weakening of the Marcher Lords") prompted the Jingnan Campaign of the Prince of Yan which ended with the apparent death of the young emperor in a palace fire and Yan's ascension as the Yongle Emperor. Despite justifying his campaign as an effort to uphold the traditions of the Hongwu Emperor and to free his nephew from the ill counsel of the court advisors, the Yongle Emperor completed the work of removing the imperial clan from the militarized borders with Mongolia, Manchuria, and Annam. For example, he granted the territory of the Prince of Ning – whose capture and support had been essential for Yan's victory and with whom he had promised to divide the empire – to allied Mongols and placed the prince himself in an ungarrisoned sinecure in Nanchang.

== Crown Prince ==
The crown prince of the empire was known as the Taizi (lit. "Supreme Son"). Under the terms of the Hongwu Emperor's dynastic instructions, he was to be selected in accordance with strict Confucian agnatic primogeniture: the eldest son of the primary consort succeeded, . Although legitimizing the ascension of the Yongle Emperor involved forged claims that he had been selected by the Hongwu Emperor over his brother Crown Prince Yiwen in direct violation of the emperor's own policy, the practice was subsequently observed except in the aftermath of the Tumu Incident. This repeatedly led to teenaged and even infant princes ascending to the throne and contributed to the domination of the government by powerful eunuch dictators.

Crown princes who failed to ascend to the imperial throne were given posthumous names including their title of taizi. They include:

- Crown Prince Yiwen, the Hongwu Emperor's eldest son Zhu Biao
- Crown Prince Hejian, the Jianwen Emperor's eldest son Zhu Wenkui
- Crown Prince Huaixian, the Jingtai Emperor's eldest son
- Crown Prince Daogong, the Chenghua Emperor's eldest son
- Crown Prince Aichong, the Jiajing Emperor's eldest son
- Crown Prince Zhuangjin, the Jiajing Emperor's 2nd son
- Crown Prince Huaichong, the Tianqi Emperor's eldest son
- Crown Prince Daohuai, the Tianqi Emperor's 2nd son
- Crown Prince Xianchong, the Tianqi Emperor's 3rd son
- Crown Prince Xianmin, the Chongzhen Emperor's eldest son

== Salaries for princes and other imperial family members ==
In 1370, the Hongwu Emperor created ten princely peerages: Qin, Jin, Yan, Zhou, Chu, Qi, Tan, Lu (鲁) and Jingjiang. Salaries for princes and princesses were set in 1376:

- For a first-rank prince:
  - 50 thousands dan of rice for a year
  - 25 thousands of banknotes for a year
  - 40 pairs of brocades for a year
  - 300 pairs of reels for a year
  - each 100 pairs of "sha" and "luo" for a year
  - 500 pairs of silk for a year
  - each 1000 of grass cloth and winter cloth for a year
  - 2000 tael of cotton for a year
  - 2000 "yin" of salt for a year
  - 1000 catties of tea for a year
  - 50 pairs of horses forage for a month
  - Satin for a year for self-made by own carpenters
- For Prince of Jingjiang:
  - 20 thousands dan of rice for a year
  - 10 thousands of banknotes for a year
  - 20 pairs of horses forage for a month

The other supplies for Prince of Jingjiang were half amount of a first-rank prince.

- For unmarried imperial daughter and without title of a princess:
  - each 10 pairs of reels, "sha" and "luo" for a year
  - each 30 pairs silk, grass cloth and winter cloth
  - 200 taels of cotton for a year
- For married imperial daughter with the title of a princess:
  - granted a farmland
  - 1500 dan of rice for a year
  - 2000 of banknotes for a year

Supplies for son of a first-rank prince without any titles and peerages were same as non-title imperial daughter, while for non-title first-rank princely daughter were half amount of non-title 1st-rank princely son.

== See also ==
- History of the Ming dynasty
- List of vassal prince peerages of the Ming dynasty
- Chinese nobility
- Kings of the Han dynasty
