= Empress Ma (Hongwu) =

Empress of China from 1368 to 1382

Empress Xiaocigao 孝慈高皇后
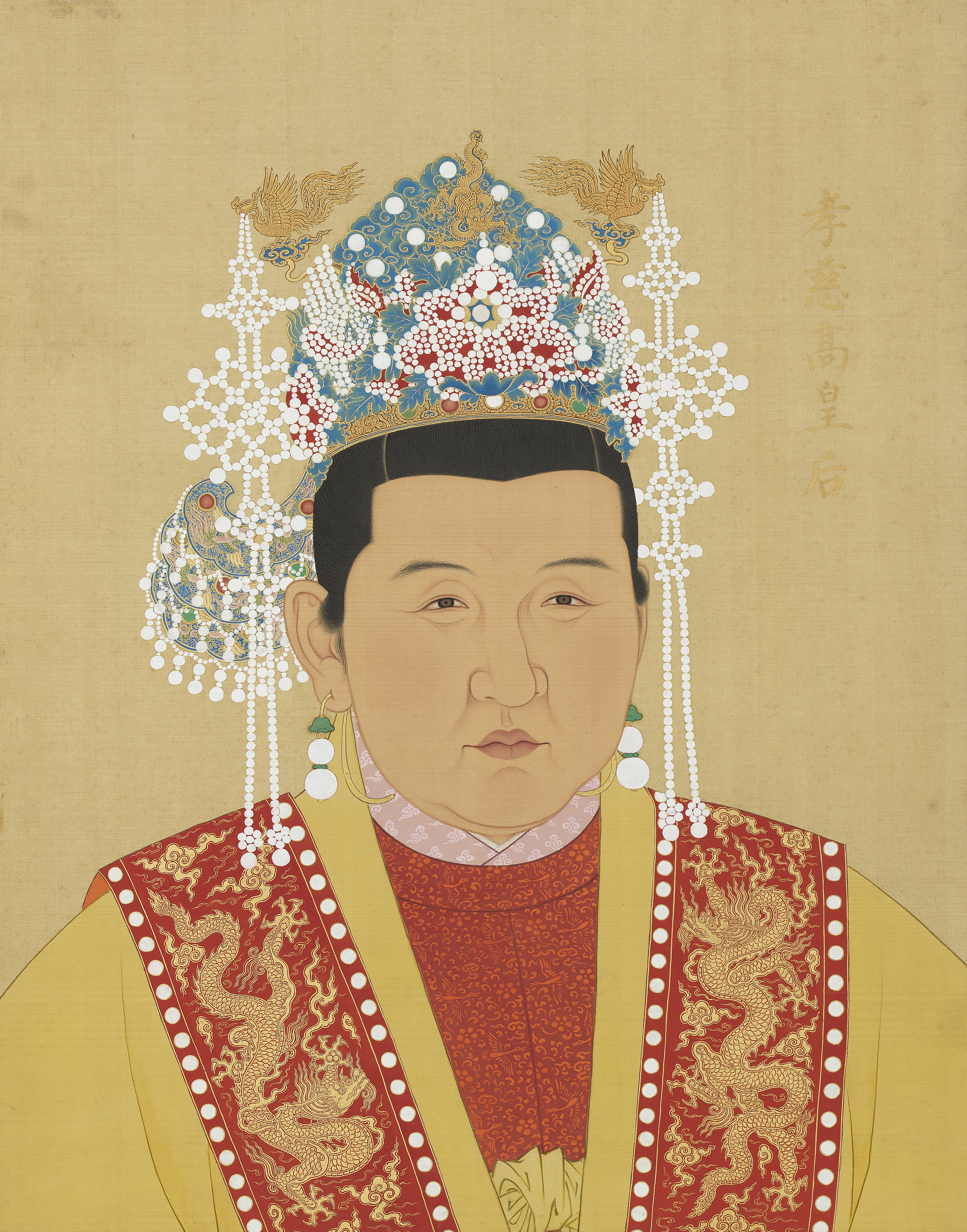

Empress consort of the Ming dynasty
- Tenure: 23 January 1368 – 23 September 1382
- Successor: Empress Xiaominrang
- Born: 18 July 1332; Suzhou
- Died: 23 September 1382 (aged 50); Yingtian Prefecture, Zhili (present-day Nanjing, Jiangsu Province, China)
- Burial: Xiaoling Mausoleum, Nanjing
- Spouse: Hongwu Emperor (m. 1352)
- Issue: Zhu Biao, Crown Prince Yiwen; Zhu Shuang, Prince Min of Qin; Zhu Gang, Prince Gong of Jin; Yongle Emperor; Zhu Su, Prince Ding of Zhou; Princess Ningguo; Princess Anqing
Names
- Ma Xiuying (馬秀英)
Posthumous name
- Empress Xiaoci Zhenhua Zheshun Renhui Chengtian Yusheng Zhide Gao (孝慈貞化哲順仁徽成天育聖至德高皇后)
- Clan: Ma (馬)
- Father: Lord Ma, Prince of Xu (徐王 馬公)
- Mother: Zheng Ao, Consort of Prince of Xu (徐王夫人 鄭媼)

Empress Xiaocigao (Chinese: 孝慈高皇后, 18 July 1332 – 23 September 1382), commonly known as Empress Ma (馬皇后), was an imperial consort of the Ming dynasty. She was the principal wife of the Hongwu Emperor and acted as his adviser in politics, exerting a large amount of influence during his reign.

== Biography ==
=== Early life ===
Her personal name was commonly known as Ma Xiuying (馬秀英), but this was never mentioned in any official records, including the History of Ming. It is noted that she was from a poor background, born in Suzhou and that she did not have bound feet. All that is known of her parentage is that her mother, who died when she was young, was surnamed Zheng, and that her father had fled with her to Dingyuan (in modern-day Anhui Province) after he had killed someone. Her father came into contact with and befriended the founder of the Red Turban army, Guo Zixing, who was affluent and influential. He took her in and adopted her when her father died. She was allowed to read books and pursue her education, an uncommon situation for the women at the time. She developed a keen interest in literature and history.

During the Red Turban Rebellion, Zhu Yuanzhang (the future Hongwu Emperor) sought refuge under Guo Zixing's command due to poverty and expulsion, and after rendering meritorious service, Guo Zixing married his adopted daughter to him in 1352. When Zhu Yuanzhang was still under Guo Zixing's command, he was once suspected of betrayal by Guo Zixing. During a famine when there was no food, Lady Ma secretly stole some cakes and gave them to Zhu Yuanzhang to eat while holding them in her chest. Because the cakes were very hot, her chest was accidentally burnt. In this way, he was able to satisfy his hunger, but she was often hungry. Later, when the two became emperor and empress, he compared their meal situation to "wild vegetables and bean porridge", "coarse barley rice", and praised her wisdom, comparing her to Empress Zhangsun of the Tang dynasty. His empress humbly replied, "I have heard that it is easy for spouses to protect each other, but difficult for monarchs and ministers to do so. Your Majesty has not forgotten our shared poverty and hardship; I hope you will not forget the hardships you share with your ministers. Besides, how dare I compare myself to Empress Zhangsun!"

Lady Ma accompanied her family on their campaigns, caring for and supporting them, while also being actively involved in managing their issues. When her husband took his forces across the Yangtze River to engage Yuan soldiers, she comforted the families of the soldiers left in Hezhou (in present-day Anhui Province) and encouraged the forces that remained with her to defend their city. In 1363, during the Battle of Lake Poyang, she was a beacon of strength and resolve during a widespread panic that had developed with the oncoming forces of rival Chen Youliang, who was also rebelling against the Yuan and whose forces almost matched those of her adoptive father in size and strength. She supplied clothing and armor to aid soldiers, encouraged them to continue fighting, and distributed gold and silk to reward those who survived.

=== Empress ===
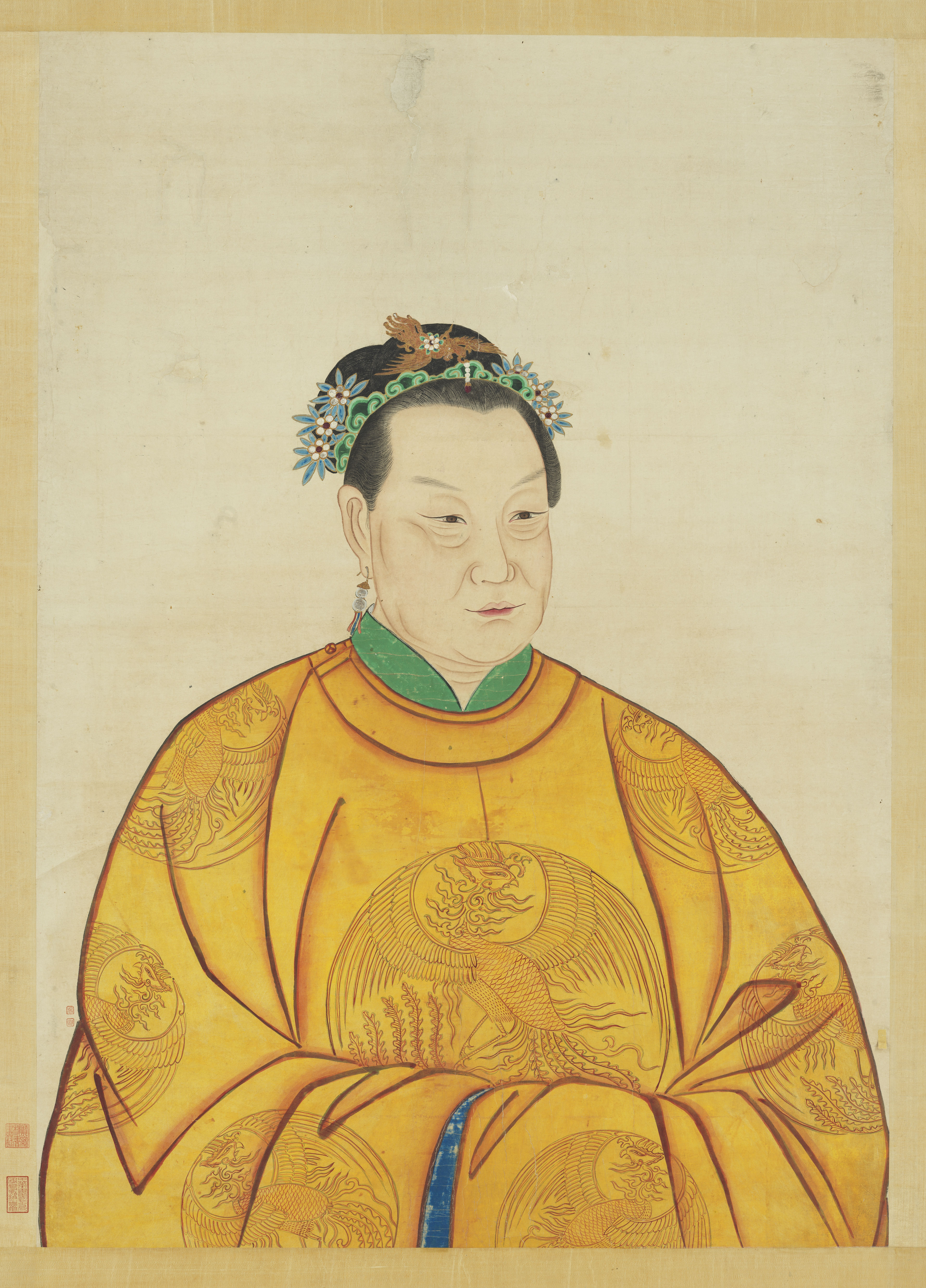
Empress Ma

On the day Zhu Yuanzhang ascended the throne (the fourth day of the first month of the first year of the Hongwu era, January 23, 1368), he appointed his wife as empress. In the second year of the Hongwu era, her birth father was posthumously given the title of Prince of Xu, her birth mother was posthumously given the title of Duchess of Xu, and a shrine was built in their honor on the east side of the ancestral temple of the Zhu Family. However, in spite of her elevation, she did not allow her husband to seek out her living relatives to inherit her father's title, thus limiting the possibility of powerful in-laws wielding political influence.

Empress Ma was known for her kindness, virtue and humility. Famous for her frugality and charity, she continued wearing common clothing until they were very old and worn out, provided blankets and curtains woven of rough silk to orphans and widows, and gave the leftover material to other palace women so that they would come to appreciate sericulture. She maintained good relations with her husband's concubines, ensuring impartial reprimand to those who violated the law in order to spare them from his infamously cruel temper. She also selected renowned Confucian scholars as teachers for the imperial princes and personally oversaw the instruction of the imperial princesses in etiquette. She had a tremendous impact on the future principal wife of the Yongle Emperor, Empress Xu.

Despite his admiration for his principal wife's wisdom, the Hongwu Emperor did not like women's involvement in politics at first and established regulations that prohibited consorts from intervening in state affairs. He also forbade palace women below the rank of empress and consort from leaving their residences unattended. Empress Ma reacted by telling her husband that as he was the father of the people, she was their mother; how then could their mother stop caring for the comfort of her children? She then ordered a compilation of the deeds of wise and virtuous empresses and consorts during the Song dynasty, as well as an observation of the palace regulations that existed during that era, which she taught to other palace women in study groups.

The Hongwu Emperor eventually changed his mind and Empress Ma began to play a more active role in politics as his adviser and secretary, even keeping control of state documents. On several occasions, she reproached and prevented the emperor from committing acts of injustice, such as when she prevented him from executing the scholar Song Lian. She also greatly looked after the wellbeing of the common people by encouraging tax reductions and reducing the burden of heavy work obligations. She notably ordered the creation of a granary in the Ming capital, Nanjing, which provided food for the families of students who were attending the local university.

=== Death and funeral ===
In the 8th month of the 15th year of the Hongwu era, Empress Ma lay ill in bed, and the courtiers clamored to pray for her and seek skilled physicians. She said to her husband: "Life and death are predetermined; what use is prayer? Besides, what can physicians do to defy fate? If medicine fails, might they not be blamed for my sake?". Upon hearing this, he asked if there were any instructions or unfulfilled wishes she had. She replied: "I hope Your Majesty will seek talents, heed counsel, and govern with diligence from beginning to end, so that your descendants and the people will prosper". Shortly after, Empress Ma died at the age of 50. The Hongwu Emperor wept bitterly and vowed never to crown another empress. Therefore, after her death, a few of his concubines like Consort Lishu and Consort Guoning managed the palace, but they did not receive the title of empress.

In the same year, in September, Empress Ma was buried at Xiaoling Mausoleum in Nanjing, and was granted the posthumous title Empress Xiaoci Zhenhua Zheshun Renhui Chengtian Yusheng Zhide Gao (孝慈貞化哲順仁徽成天育聖至德高皇后). After her death, palace attendants often reminisced about her, and there were songs praising her such as: "Our empress, compassionate and virtuous, guided the nation with her benevolence. She nurtured and cared for us, her virtue forever remembered. Forever remembered, through countless years. Like a tranquil spring, flowing under the vast sky".

== Descendants ==
According to official historical records, Empress Ma bore five sons and two daughters:

- Zhu Biao, Crown Prince Yiwen (懿文皇太子 朱標; 10 October 1355 – 17 May 1392), the Hongwu Emperor's first son.
- Zhu Shuang, Prince Min of Qin (秦愍王 朱樉; 3 December 1356 – 9 April 1395), the Hongwu Emperor's second son.
- Zhu Gang, Prince Gong of Jin (晉恭王 朱㭎; 18 December 1358 – 30 March 1398), the Hongwu Emperor's third son.
- Zhu Di, the Yongle Emperor (永樂帝 朱棣; 2 May 1360 – 12 August 1424), the Hongwu Emperor's fourth son.
- Zhu Su, Prince Ding of Zhou (周定王 朱橚; 8 October 1361 – 2 September 1425), the Hongwu Emperor's fifth son.
- Princess Ningguo (寧國公主; 1364 – 7 September 1434), the Hongwu Emperor's second daughter.
- Princess Anqing (安慶公主), the Hongwu Emperor's fourth daughter.

However, there is no mention in her official biography that Empress Ma ever gave birth to any children. For a long period of time, it was believed she was the mother of the first five of her husband's twenty-six sons. But because of the disputes surrounding Zhu Di's birth mother, there are also different accounts of her children. Some modern historians believe that she only gave birth to two daughters and was given the emperor's first five sons to raise as her own as well, which may explain why she kept such good relations with his concubines.

According to the History of Ming, the first five sons of Zhu Yuanzhang, Crown Prince Zhu Biao, Prince Zhu Shuang, Prince Zhu Gang, Emperor Yongle, and Prince Zhu Su, were all born to Empress Ma. According to the Ming Veritable Records, Emperor Yongle was born on April 17, 1360, and Prince Zhu Su was born on July 9, 1361. This situation has long been doubted, especially in chaotic times. It is unlikely that she would have been solely responsible for childbirth tasks, and some Ming scholars have even suggested that "Empress Gao had no children". In Xie Jin's "Great Encyclopedia of Yongle", it is mentioned: "There were twenty-four imperial sons, the fourth being the current emperor and the fifth being the Prince Zhu Su, both born to Empress Gaohuang. The eldest, Crown Prince Yiwen, the second, Prince Qinmin, and the third, Prince Jingong, were born to other mothers". As mentioned in Pan Chengzhang's "National History Annotations": "According to the current Yudie, the fourth son is the current emperor and the fifth son is Prince Zhu Su, both born to Empress Gaohuang". Lang Ying, in "Seven Collections of Historical Chronicles", also noted, "Empress Gaohuang gave birth to two sons, as recorded in the current Yufu Yudie".

From Shen Ruolin's "Nanjing Taichang Temple Records" (now lost), cited by contemporary author: "At the shrine of filial piety, on the left, there is Li Shufei, who gave birth to Crown Prince Yiwen, Prince Qinmin, and Prince Jingong; on the second left, there are empresses who gave birth to King Chu [and ten other kings]; on the third left, there are noble consorts who gave birth to Prince Xiangxian [and four other princes]; on the fourth left, there are noble ladies who gave birth to Prince Liao [...]. On the right, there is Gongfei, who gave birth to Emperor Wenzu".

From Zhu Yizun's "Poetry Talk of the Quiet Abode", Volume 13, concerning Shen Yuanhua's entry: "In the ancestral temple arrangements (the Fengxian Hall of the former Ming Palace in Nanjing), the high consort faces south, with all the consorts arranged to the east, except for one consort, Gongfei, arranged to the west, as recorded in the Nanjing Court of Imperial Sacrifices Records. It is known that the Empress Gong never conceived, not only in Changling, but also Crown Prince Yiwen was not born from her".

Li Qing's "San Yuan Notes" states: "The records of the Nanjing Court of Imperial Sacrifices mention that Emperor Yongle was born to Lady Gong, which is surprising. Qian Qianyi, who was known for his extensive learning, was consulted about this matter but was unable to confirm it. As mentioned in the records, there were over twenty concubines listed on the east side, while on the west side, there was only Lady Gong. To verify this, an investigation was conducted in the sleeping hall, and indeed, upon inspection, it was found to be true, thus confirming the account".

In Liu Jizhuang's "Guangyang Miscellaneous Records", it is mentioned that the mother of Emperor Yongle was Lady Weng, a Mongolian woman, who became a concubine of Emperor Yuan Shundi. This information was concealed. "There is a separate ancestral shrine within the palace, worshipped by generations, which is unrelated to Qian Qianyi's account. The officials of the Ministry of Rites consulted with Peng Gong'an about this matter, as they had heard similar stories from elders in Yan, and now they believed it". The above are all records from the Ming dynasty.

There are also explanations that Emperor Yongle took the throne from his nephew, the Jianwen Emperor, wanting to further legitimize his claim (as Zhu Yuanzhang placed significant importance on the distinction between legitimate and illegitimate offspring). Therefore, he claimed that he was born from Empress Ma, so that inheriting the throne as a legitimate son would be justified.

== Titles ==
- During the reign of the Emperor Shun of Yuan (r. 1333–1368):
  - Lady Ma (馬氏; from 18 July 1332 )
  - Primary consort
- During the reign of the Hongwu Emperor (r. 1368–1398):
  - Empress (皇后; from 23 January 1368)
  - Empress Xiaoci (孝慈皇后; from 1382)
  - Empress Xiaoci Zhenhua Zheshun Renhui Chengtian Yusheng Zhide Gao (孝慈貞化哲順仁徽成天育聖至德高皇后; from 1398)
  - Empress Xiaoci Zhaoxian Zhiren Wende Chengtian Shunsheng Gao (孝慈昭憲至仁文德承天順聖高皇后), by the Jiangwen Emperor, in the sixth month of the thirty-first year of the Hongwu era (1398).
- During the reign of the Yongle Emperor (r. 1402–1424):
  - Empress Xiaoci Zhaoxian Zhiren Wende Chengtian Shunsheng Gao (孝慈昭憲至仁文德承天順聖高皇后; from 1421). In later generations, she would be referred to as Empress Xiaoci Gao (孝慈高皇后
- During the reign of the Jiajing Emperor (r. 1521–1567):
  - Empress Xiaoci Zhenhua Zheshun Renhui Chengtian Yusheng Zhide Gao (孝慈貞化哲順仁徽成天育聖至德高皇后; from 1538) by the Jiajing Emperor.

== In popular culture ==
- Portrayed by Lü Liping in Empress Ma With Big Feet (大腳馬皇后) (2002)
- Portrayed by Barbara Chen (陳敏兒) in Born to be a King (大明群英) (1987)
- Portrayed by Alice Fung So-bor in The Court Secret Agent (锦衣卫, Asia Television) (1988).
- Portrayed by Ju Xue (剧雪) in Zhu Yuanzhang (朱元璋) (1993)
- Portrayed by Chen Yalan (陳亞蘭) in The Legendary Liu Bowen (神機妙算劉伯溫) (2006–2008)
- Portrayed by Ju Xue in Founding Emperor of Ming Dynasty (2006)
- Portrayed by Xu Fan in Chuanqi Huangdi Zhu Yuanzhang (2006)
- Portrayed by Heidi Wong (王姬) in The Imperial Age (山河月明) (2022).
- Portrayed in Shelley Parker-Chan's historical fiction novels, She Who Became the Sun and He Who Drowned the World.

Chinese royalty
New title Dynasty established	Empress consort of the Ming dynasty 1368–1382	Succeeded by Empress Xiaominrang
Preceded by Empress Gi (Yuan dynasty); Empress Wang (Ming Xia)	Empress consort of China; 1368–1382	Succeeded by Empress Xiaominrang
