= Empress Ma (Jianwen) =

Empress of China from 1399 to 1402

Empress Xiaominrang 孝愍讓皇后

Empress consort of the Ming dynasty
- Tenure: 1399 – 13 July 1402
- Predecessor: Empress Xiaocigao
- Successor: Empress Renxiaowen
- Died: 13 July 1402
- Spouse: Jianwen Emperor (m. 1395)
- Issue: Zhu Wenkui; Zhu Wengui
Names
- Ma Enhui (馬恩慧)
Posthumous name
- Empress Xiaomin Wenzhen Zherui Sulie Xiangtian Bisheng Rang (Note: Simplified Chinese: 孝愍温贞哲睿肃烈襄天弼圣让皇后; traditional Chinese: 孝愍溫貞哲睿肅烈襄天弼聖讓皇后)
- Clan: Ma
- Father: Ma Quan

Chinese name
- Traditional Chinese: 孝愍讓皇后
- Simplified Chinese: 孝愍让皇后
Transcriptions
Standard Mandarin
- Hanyu Pinyin: Xiàomǐnràng huánghòu

Empress Xiaominrang (died 13 July 1402), of the Ma clan, personal name Ma Enhui, was the empress consort to the Jianwen Emperor and the second empress consort of China's Ming dynasty. In 1395, she married Zhu Yunwen when he was heir to the throne. When Zhu Yunwen ascended the throne as the Jianwen Emperor, he made her empress in 1399. They had two sons, Zhu Wenkui and Zhu Wengui. In 1402, Zhu Di, Prince of Yan, led his forces against the Jianwen Emperor during the Jingnan campaign. After Zhu Di's forces captured the Ming capital Nanjing, the Emperor disappeared, while Empress Ma died in a fire at the imperial palace. In 1644, she was posthumously granted the title Empress Xiaominrang.

== Biography ==
Empress Ma's year of birth is unknown. She was born Ma Enhui (馬恩慧) in Haozhou, Nanzhili (present-day Fengyang, Anhui), during the reign (1368–1398) of the Ming dynasty's founding emperor Hongwu. Her father, Ma Quan (馬全), served as vice minister of the Court of Imperial Entertainments. She was known for her intelligence and perceptiveness.

In 1395, Lady Ma became the consort of Zhu Yunwen, the Hongwu Emperor's grandson and designated heir. The following year, she gave birth to their first son, Zhu Wenkui. Following the Hongwu Emperor's death in 1398, Zhu Yunwen ascended the throne as the Jianwen Emperor. In 1399, the Jianwen Emperor appointed Lady Ma as empress and Zhu Wenkui as his heir. In 1401, the Empress gave birth to a second son, Zhu Wengui.

After ascending the throne, the Jianwen Emperor introduced measures to curtail the power of the imperial princes, who were his uncles and sons of the Hongwu Emperor. (Note: The Hongwu Emperor granted his sons princely titles (wang), along with substantial incomes and privileges. They were stationed in various provinces and commanded forces ranging from 3,000 to 15,000 men.) These measures prompted his uncle Zhu Di, Prince of Yan, to launch a rebellion in August 1399. On 13 July 1402, Zhu Di captured Nanjing, ascending the throne as the Yongle Emperor four days later. During the fall of Nanjing, the imperial palace burned down, and Empress Ma died in the fire. On 21 July, her body was discovered among the ruins and subsequently buried.

The Jianwen Emperor and his eldest son, Zhu Wenkui, disappeared during the fall of Nanjing but were later declared to have died alongside Empress Ma in the palace fire. Her second son, Zhu Wengui, survived and the Yongle Emperor had him confined in Fengyang, where he remained until the Yongle Emperor's great-grandson, Emperor Yingzong, released him in 1457. After more than five decades in confinement, he was reportedly unable even to distinguish cattle from horses. He died of illness shortly afterward. In July 1644, the Hongguang Emperor of the Southern Ming dynasty conferred on Empress Ma the posthumous name "Empress Xiaomin Wenzhen Zherui Sulie Xiangtian Bisheng Rang".

== Titles ==
The titles of Empress Ma:

- During the reign of the Hongwu Emperor (1368–1398):
  - Lady Ma (馬氏)
  - Consort of the Imperial Grandson-heir (皇太孫妃; from 1395)
- During the reign of the Jianwen Emperor (1398–1402):
  - Empress (皇后; from 1399)
- During the reign of the Hongguang Emperor (1644–1645):
  - Empress Xiaomin Wenzhen Zherui Sulie Xiangtian Bisheng Rang (from 1644)

== Issue ==
- As consort of the Imperial Grandson-heir:
  - Zhu Wenkui (朱文奎), Crown Prince Hejian (和簡皇太子; 30 November 1396 – 1402), the Jianwen Emperor's first son
- As empress:
  - Zhu Wengui (朱文圭), Prince of Runhuai (潤懷王; 1401–1457), the Jianwen Emperor's second son

== Notes ==
Chinese royalty
Preceded by Empress Xiaocigao	Empress consort of China; 1399–1402	Succeeded by Empress Renxiaowen
