= Zhu Wengui =

Chinese prince (1401–1458)

Zhu Wengui (Note: Chinese: 朱文圭; pinyin: Zhū Wénguī) (December 1401 – 1458) was a prince of the Ming dynasty of China. He was the second son of the Jianwen Emperor and Empress Ma. After his father was overthrown by the Yongle Emperor in 1402, Zhu Wengui, then only two years old, was confined in Fengyang. In 1457, he was released from confinement by Emperor Yingzong. Having spent many years in isolation, he was reportedly unable to recognize even cattle and horses upon his release. He died shortly afterward from illness.

== Biography ==
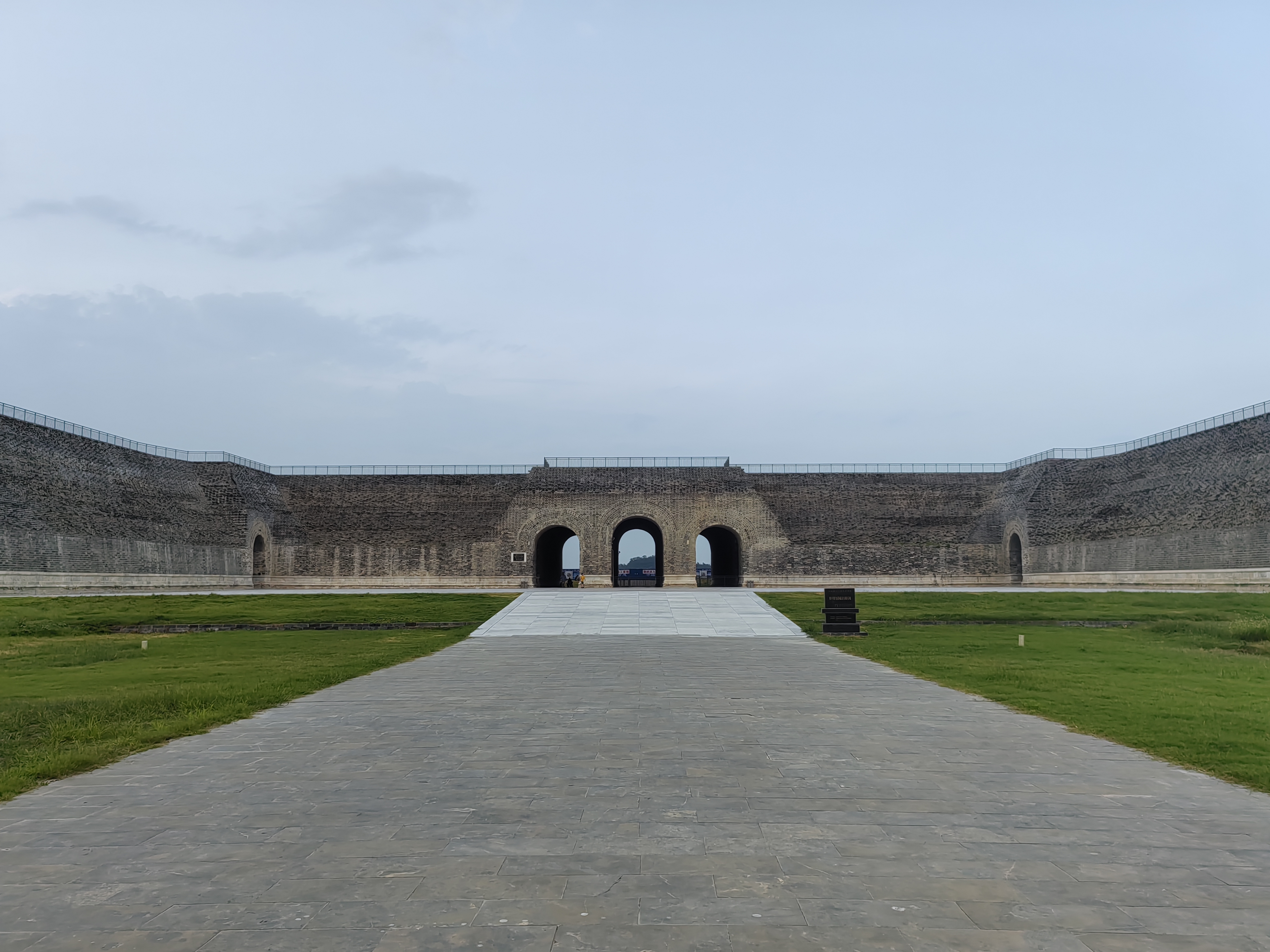
Ruins of the Ming central capital, where Zhu Wengui was confined for about 55 years

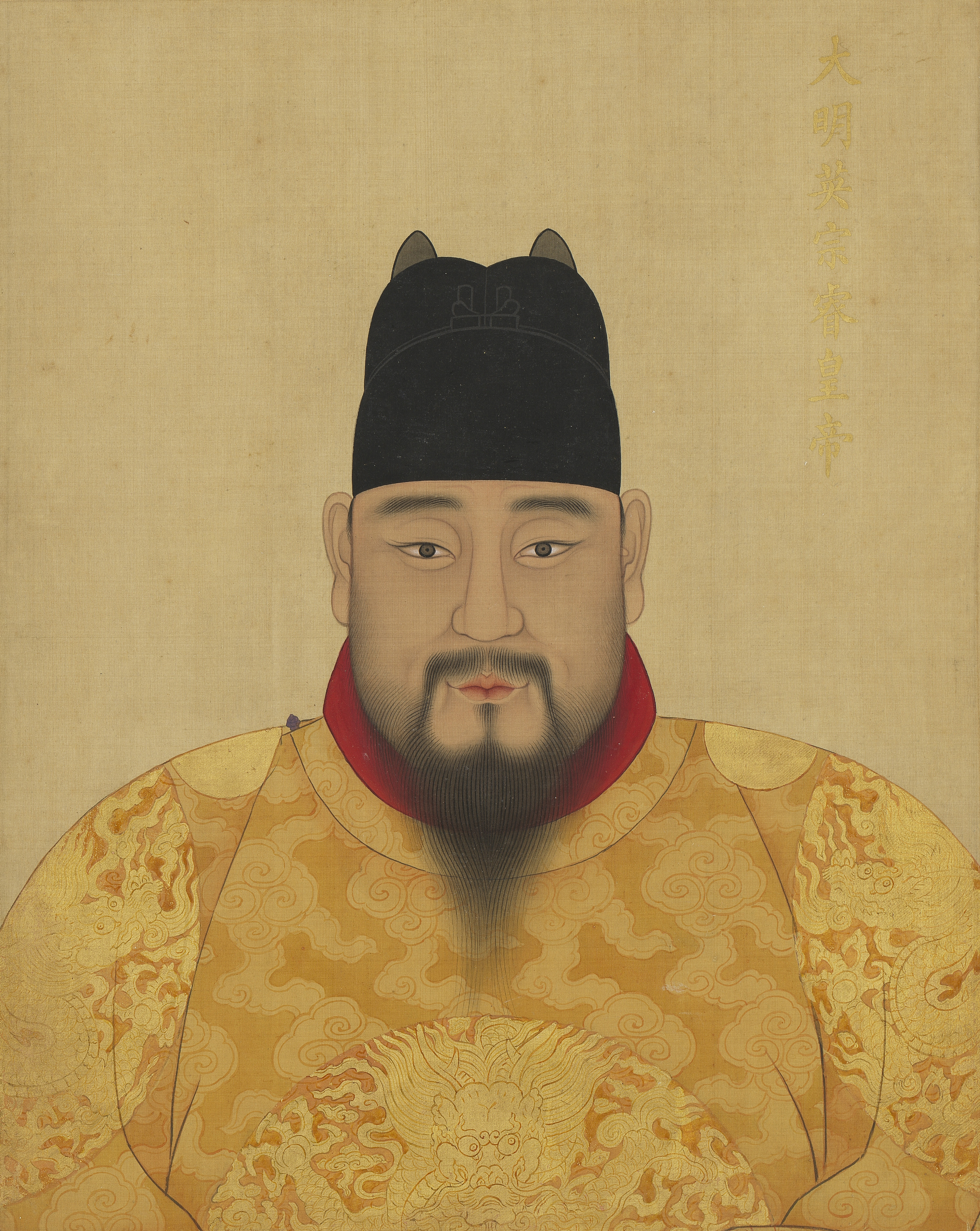
Emperor Yingzong released Zhu Wengui in 1457 out of sympathy for him after having himself spent eight years in confinement

Zhu Wengui was born in December 1401 as the second son of the Jianwen Emperor (r. 1398–1402), the second emperor of China's Ming dynasty, and Empress Ma. His elder brother, Zhu Wenkui, was born in 1396 and designated as heir apparent. Zhu Wengui's grandfather, Zhu Biao (d. 1392), was the eldest son and heir apparent of the founding Ming emperor Hongwu (r. 1368–1398).

Upon his accession, the Jianwen Emperor implemented the policy of "reducing the feudatories" (削藩; xuefan) to curtail the authority of the princes, who were the sons of the Hongwu Emperor. The policy led to the rebellion of Zhu Di, Prince of Yan, in the autumn of 1399. The ensuing civil war, known as the Jingnan campaign, ended when Zhu Di captured the Ming capital Nanjing in 1402, after which he ascended the throne as the Yongle Emperor. In the clashes during the fall of Nanjing, the imperial palace burned down, reportedly killing Zhu Wengui's parents and brother. The Yongle Emperor spared the infant Zhu Wengui, designating him as Jian shuren (建庶人; 'the Commoner of Jian') and confining him in Guang'an Palace in Fengyang, the Ming central capital. He was later transferred to the "High Walls" (高牆), a special prison for members of the Ming imperial family convicted of crimes.

Zhu Wengui remained in confinement from the Yongle era (1402–1424) until the second reign of Emperor Yingzong (1457–1464), spending a total of 55 years in isolation. Emperor Yingzong had himself spent eight years in captivity and confinement, and after his restoration to the throne in 1457, he decided to release Zhu Wengui later that year. (Note: Emperor Yingzong's first reign (1435–1449) ended in the Tumu Crisis when the Oirat Mongols captured him and took him as a prisoner to Mongolia. His younger brother and successor, the Jingtai Emperor (r. 1449–1457), later negotiated with the Oirats for his release. However, after his return to China, Emperor Yingzong was confined to the Southern Palace. Having experienced eight years of captivity and confinement, he was deeply affected by these hardships. After restoring himself to the throne through a palace coup in 1457, he decided to release Zhu Wengui.) He granted Zhu Wengui servants and built a residence for him in Fengyang. Having been confined since the age of two, Zhu Wengui was reportedly unable to speak or recognize even cattle and horses when he was released. He died of illness shortly afterward in 1458.

In October 1467, the Nanjing eunuchs reported that the households of Jian shuren and Wu shuren (吳庶人), consisting of eighteen people, lacked sufficient clothing, resulting in the deaths of five individuals. Their six female servants also lacked adequate clothing, and the Chenghua Emperor (r. 1464–1487) ordered the Ministry of Works to provide assistance. The Jian shuren was likely a descendant or relative of Zhu Wengui, and the Wu shuren was likely a descendant or relative of Zhu Yunteng (朱允熥; d. 1417), the younger brother of the Jianwen Emperor. On 12 November of that year, Teng Zhao (滕昭), censor-in-chief and grand coordinator of Huaiyang, requested that Jian shuren and Wu shuren be relocated to the fortified walls of Fengyang, where they would be placed under the supervision of military guards, but the Emperor rejected the proposal. During the Southern Ming dynasty, Zhu Wengui was posthumously granted the title of Prince of Runhuai (潤懷王).
