= Zhu Wenkui =

Crown Prince of China from 1399 to 1402

Zhu Wenkui 朱文奎
- Crown Prince of the Ming dynasty
- Born: 30 November 1396
- Died: 13 July 1402 (aged 5)
Names
- Zhu Wenkui
- House: Zhu
- Father: Jianwen Emperor
- Mother: Empress Ma

Chinese name
- Chinese: 朱文奎
Transcriptions
Standard Mandarin
- Hanyu Pinyin: Zhū Wénkuí

Zhu Wenkui (30 November 1396 – 13 July 1402) was a prince of the Ming dynasty of China. He was the eldest son of the Jianwen Emperor and Empress Ma. His father designated him as heir to the throne in 1399. Zhu Wenkui disappeared during the fall of Nanjing in 1402, when the Yongle Emperor overthrew the Jianwen Emperor. It was later claimed that Zhu Wenkui perished in the palace fire alongside his mother, Empress Ma.

== Biography ==
Zhu Wenkui was born on 30 November 1396 to Zhu Yunwen and Lady Ma. Zhu Yunwen was the grandson and heir apparent of the Hongwu Emperor, the founder of China's Ming dynasty. As Zhu Wenkui was born on the last day of the month (晦日), (Note: 晦日 (Huiri), literally meaning "dark day", refers to the last day of a lunar month, when the Moon is barely visible or invisible from Earth. It was considered an unlucky day.) the Emperor ordered the imperial household not to celebrate the occasion. Zhu Wenkui's grandfather was Zhu Biao, the Hongwu Emperor's eldest son and designated heir, who died in 1392. Zhu Wenkui's father, Zhu Yunwen, was appointed as his successor in the same year.

Following the Hongwu Emperor's death in 1398, Zhu Yunwen ascended the throne as the Jianwen Emperor. In 1399, he named Zhu Wenkui as his heir. In 1401, Zhu Wenkui's younger brother, Zhu Wengui, was born.

After ascending the throne, the Jianwen Emperor introduced measures to curtail the power of the imperial princes, who were his uncles and sons of the Hongwu Emperor. (Note: The Hongwu Emperor granted his sons princely titles (wang), along with substantial incomes and privileges. They were stationed in various provinces and commanded forces ranging from 3,000 to 15,000 men.) These measures prompted his uncle Zhu Di, Prince of Yan, to launch a rebellion in August 1399. On 13 July 1402, Zhu Di captured Nanjing, ascending the throne as the Yongle Emperor four days later. During the fall of Nanjing, the imperial palace burned down, and Empress Ma died in the fire.

The Jianwen Emperor and Zhu Wenkui disappeared during the fall of Nanjing but were later declared to have died alongside Empress Ma in the palace fire. Zhu Wenkui's younger brother, Zhu Wengui, survived and the Yongle Emperor had him confined in Fengyang, where he remained until the Yongle Emperor's great-grandson, Emperor Yingzong, released him in 1457. In July 1644, the Hongguang Emperor of the Southern Ming dynasty conferred on Zhu Wenkui the posthumous name Crown Prince Gongmin (恭愍皇太子). Later, the Longwu Emperor conferred on him the posthumous name Crown Prince Hejian (和簡皇太子).

== Notes ==
Zhu Wenkui House of Zhu Born: 30 November 1396 Died: 13 July 1402
Chinese royalty
Vacant Title last held by Zhu Yunwen as Imperial Grandson-heir	Crown Prince of the Ming dynasty 1399–1402	Vacant Title next held by Zhu Gaochi
