= Taizi =

Title for crown prince of imperial China

Taizi (Chinese: 太子; pinyin: tàizǐ; lit. 'Supreme Son') was the title of the crown prince of imperial China.

== Succession ==
Traditional Confucian political theory favored strict agnatic primogeniture, (Note: In fact, this was at odds with China's oldest recorded traditions: the Shang clan survivors who ruled Song after the rise of the Zhou pointedly practiced agnatic seniority, favoring a father's surviving brothers over his offspring.) with younger sons displaying filial obedience to the eldest upon the passing of the father. This rather straightforward system was somewhat complicated by concubinage: since concubines were subordinated to the main wife, their children – even when born first – were likewise subordinated to hers.

Following Lu Jia's conversion of Liu Bang to Confucianism in the early 1st century BC, Chinese dynasties observed it in theory though not always in practice. Liu Bang himself began to favor Concubine Qi, a later concubine, to his primary empress, Lü Zhi, and doubted the competence of his heir Liu Ying. Even worse conflicts could occur when invaders – previously observing their own rules of inheritance – began to sinicize, as happened to the 10th-century Liao dynasty.

Under the Ming dynasty, the traditional Confucian principles of succession were upheld by the Hongwu Emperor's Instructions of the Ancestor of the August Ming. These presented a grave problem when his eldest son Zhu Biao died early, leaving a power struggle between a sheltered teenage grandson and his many experienced and well-armed uncles. One of these, the Prince of Yan, eventually overthrew his nephew under the pretense of saving him from ill counsel. His own legitimacy was precariously established: a charred body was procured from the ruins of Nanjing and proclaimed to be the accidentally-killed emperor; the nephew's reign was then condemned and delegitimized and the surviving son kept imprisoned and single; and imperial records were falsified to establish the Prince of Yan as his father's favorite and as a son of the primary wife, giving him primacy over his other brothers.

== Names ==
As taizi, the crown prince would possess a name separate both from his personal name and (if he becomes emperor) from his later era name, temple name and posthumous name.

== Lists ==
=== Crown Princes of Northern Wei ===
- Tuoba Huang, Crown Prince Jing Mu, son of Emperor Taiwu of Northern Wei, served as regent and military commander during his father's campaigns

=== Crown Princes of Qin ===
- Fusu, eldest son of Qin Shi Huang, forced to commit suicide by a forged edict after his father's death

=== Crown Princes of Song ===
- Zhao Xun, adopted crown prince of the childless Emperor Ningzong, reigned as crown prince 1207–1220

=== Crown Princes of Zhou ===
- Jī Xiefu, son of King Ping of Zhou

=== Crown Princes of Han ===
- Crown Prince Ying, son of Liu Bang (Emperor Gao), later Emperor Hui
- Crown Prince Qi, son of Emperor Wen, later Emperor Jing
- Crown Prince Rong, son of Emperor Jing, later demoted to Prince of Linjiang
- Crown Prince Che, son of Emperor Jing, originally Prince of Jiaodong and later Emperor Wu
- Crown Prince Li, son of Emperor Wu, rebelled and killed
- Crown Prince Fuling, son of Emperor Wu, later Emperor Zhao
- Crown Prince Shu, son of Emperor Xuan, later Emperor Yuan
- Crown Prince Ao, son of Emperor Yuan, later Emperor Cheng
- Crown Prince Xin, grandson of Emperor Yuan, originally Prince of Dingtao, later adopted by Emperor Cheng, whom he succeeded as Emperor Ai

=== Crown Princes of Jin ===
- Crown Prince Zhong, son of Emperor Wu of Jin, later Emperor Hui
- Sima Yu, Crown Prince Minhuai, son of Emperor Hui
- Sima Ying, half-brother of Emperor Hui, who took on the title Huang Taidi (Chinese: 皇太弟; pinyin: huángtàidì; lit. 'Royal Supreme Younger Brother') for a while during the War of the Eight Princes.
- Sima Tan, nephew of Emperor Hui
- Sima Chi, half-brother of Emperor Hui who also took on the title Huang Taidi, later Emperor Huai

=== Crown Princes of Sui ===
- Yang Yong, son of Emperor Wen of Sui, killed by Emperor Yang
- Yang Guang, son of Emperor Wen, later Emperor Yang
- Yang Zhao, Crown Prince Yuande, son of Emperor Yang, predeceased his father

=== Crown Princes of Tang ===
- Li Jiancheng, son of Emperor Gaozu, killed during the Xuanwu Gate Incident
- Li Chengqian, son of Emperor Taizong, demoted
- Li Zhi, son of Emperor Taizong, later Emperor Gaozong
- Li Zhong, son of Emperor Gaozong, forced to commit suicide
- Li Xian, Crown Prince Zhanghuai, son of Emperor Gazong, forced to commit suicide
- Li Hong, son of Emperor Gaozong, either died of illness or poisoned by mother Wu Zetian
- Li Xian, son of Emperor Gaozong, later Emperor Zhongzong
- Li Chengqi, son of Emperor Ruizong, posthumously known as Emperor Rang
- Li Longji, son of Emperor Ruizong, later Emperor Xuanzong
- Li Heng, son of Emperor Xuanzong, later Emperor Suzong

=== Crown Princes of Ming ===
- Crown Prince Yiwen, son of the Hongwu Emperor, predeceased his father
- Crown Prince Zhu Yunwen, son of Crown Prince Yiwen, later the Jianwen Emperor, posthumously demoted & restored
- Crown Prince Hejian, son of the Jianwen Emperor, allegedly burnt to death, posthumously demoted & restored
- Crown Prince Zhu Gaochi, son of the Yongle Emperor, later the Hongxi Emperor
- Crown Prince Zhu Zhanji, son of the Hongxi Emperor, later the Xuande Emperor
- Crown Prince Zhu Qizhen, son of the Xuande Emperor, later the Zhengtong & Tianshun Emperor
- Crown Prince Zhu Jianshen, son of the Zhengtong & Tianshun Emperor, demoted
- Crown Prince Huaixian, son of the Jingtai Emperor, demoted & posthumously restored
- Crown Prince Zhu Jianshen, restored, later the Chenghua Emperor
- Crown Prince Daogong, son of the Chenghua Emperor, predeceased his father
- Crown Prince Zhu Youcheng, son of the Chenghua Emperor, later the Hongzhi Emperor
- Crown Prince Zhu Houzhao, son of the Hongzhi Emperor, later the Zhengde Emperor
- Crown Prince Aichong, son of the Jiajing Emperor, predeceased his father
- Crown Prince Zhuangjin, son of the Jiajing Emperor, predeceased his father
- Crown Prince Zhu Zaihou, son of the Jiajing Emperor, later the Longqing Emperor
- Crown Prince Zhu Yijun, son of the Longqing Emperor, later the Wanli Emperor
- Crown Prince Zhu Changluo, son of the Wanli Emperor, later the Taichang Emperor
- Crown Prince Zhu Youxiao, son of the Taichang Emperor, later the Tianqi Emperor
- Crown Prince Huaichong, son of the Tianqi Emperor, predeceased his father
- Crown Prince Daohuai, son of the Tianqi Emperor, predeceased his father
- Crown Prince Xianchong, son of the Tianqi Emperor, predeceased his father
- Crown Prince Xianmin, son of the Chongzhen Emperor

== See also ==
- Crown prince
- The "Crown Prince Party" faction of the Chinese Communist Party, which employs the same characters
