= Hongwu era =

Period of Chinese history (1368–1398)

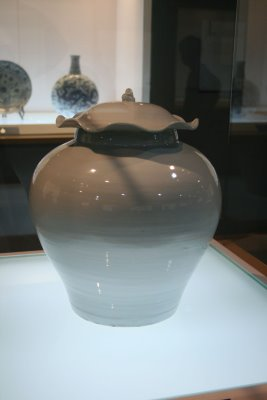
A porcelain jar from the Hongwu era. Nanjing Museum

The Hongwu era (Note: Chinese: 洪武; pinyin: Hóngwǔ; lit. 'vastly martial') was the period in Chinese history from 1368 to 1398, corresponding to the reign of the Hongwu Emperor, the founder of the Ming dynasty. The Hongwu era was characterized by the reconstruction of state infrastructure and the restoration of the economy after the devastation of the Yuan period, including the construction of Nanjing as a new capital and the strengthening of administrative control through detailed population and land registers. The era also emphasized social regulation, agricultural recovery, and the consolidation of centralized imperial authority.

== Background ==
The Ming dynasty was founded by the Hongwu Emperor, who successfully overthrew the Mongol-led Yuan dynasty and reestablished Han Chinese rule over China proper. Upon ascending the throne, he adopted Hongwu, meaning "Abundantly Martial", as his era name and designated 1368 as the first year of the Hongwu era. The era was preceded by Emperor Huizong of Yuan's Zhizheng era. In 1398, the Hongwu Emperor died, and his grandson Zhu Yunwen succeeded to the throne and took the era name Jianwen. In 1402, after a four-year civil war, the Jianwen Emperor was overthrown by his uncle, the Yongle Emperor. The new emperor did not recognize his predecessor's reign, abolished the Jianwen era, and continued the Hongwu era through 1402.

== Economy and society ==
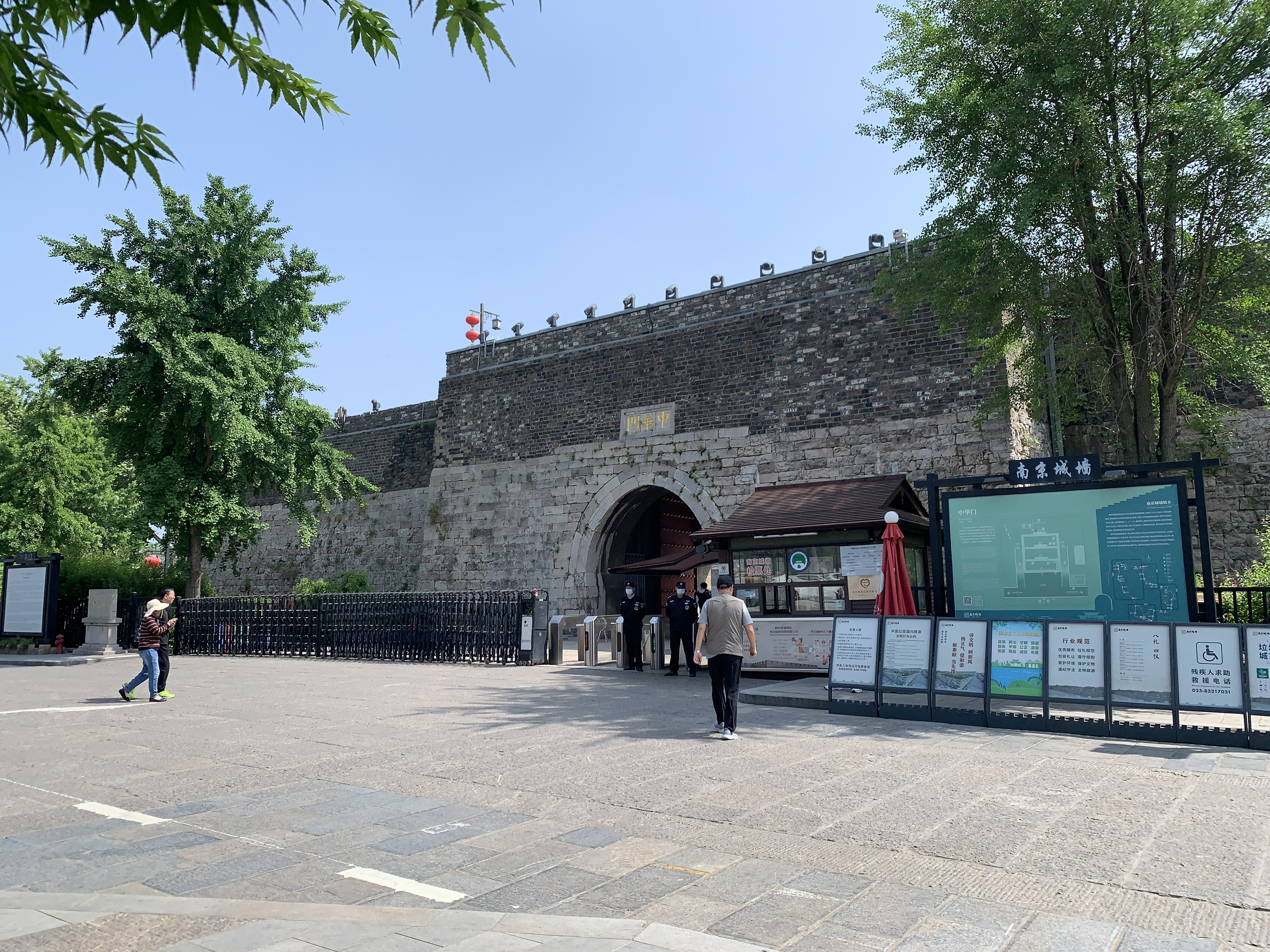
Zhonghua Gate, known as Jubao Gate during the Ming, is part of the Nanjing city wall, which was built in the Hongwu era

After the establishment of the Ming dynasty, the Hongwu Emperor immediately focused on rebuilding the state's infrastructure. He spearheaded the construction of Nanjing as the new capital, with thousands of laborers working to build a 48-kilometre-long (30 mi) city wall, as well as the imperial palace and government buildings. The government also prioritized the country's economy, (Note: By the early 14th century, the Yuan economy was experiencing increasing difficulties. Economic conditions deteriorated, inflation rapidly eroded the value of paper currency, and social inequality widened considerably. These economic problems coincided with the political instability and rebellions that marked the dynasty's final decades.) particularly by addressing issues of land ownership. The Emperor ensured that peasants and large landowners who had acquired land during the wars would retain ownership, provided they cultivated it. As arable land was scarce, the government granted three-year tax exemptions to farmers who brought uncultivated land under cultivation. This policy led to the resettlement of deserted areas around the northern cities by the third year of the Hongwu era. Additionally, the government encouraged refugees and inhabitants of densely populated regions to relocate to vacant lands by granting them various concessions. To increase the labor force, the Emperor abolished slavery (allowing only members of the imperial family to own slaves), reduced the number of monks, prohibited the buying and selling of free people, and banned the slave trade. In 1381, the government conducted a general census to improve tax administration and prevent officials and landlords from shifting the tax burden onto independent peasants.

In addition to reclaiming abandoned land, the early years of the Ming dynasty also saw efforts to restore irrigation systems that had fallen into disrepair amid the wars and upheavals of the late Yuan period. The Hongwu Emperor issued a decree for local officials to report any requests or concerns from the population regarding the repair or construction of irrigation works. In 1394, he issued a decree for the Ministry of Works to ensure that canals and dams were properly maintained in preparation for droughts or heavy rains. Graduates of state schools and technical specialists were also sent out to supervise flood-control projects across the country. In the winter of 1395, a total of 40,987 dikes and drainage canals were constructed throughout the empire.

The Hongwu Emperor's government implemented a restrictive approach towards foreign trade. The authorities acknowledged commerce as a legitimate activity, but officially deemed it undesirable and subjected it to strict regulation. Private overseas trade was prohibited, and foreign exchange was primarily limited to tribute missions and diplomatic interactions. Goods brought by foreign envoys were often registered and, to a large extent, purchased by the state. Any remaining merchandise could be sold only under strict government supervision, within limited periods and at designated locations. Despite these measures, illicit maritime trade persisted, and Chinese merchants continued to operate abroad, particularly in Southeast Asia, although such activities were illegal. This policy reflected the Emperor's broader economic vision, which aimed to subordinate commerce to state control and diplomatic exchange.

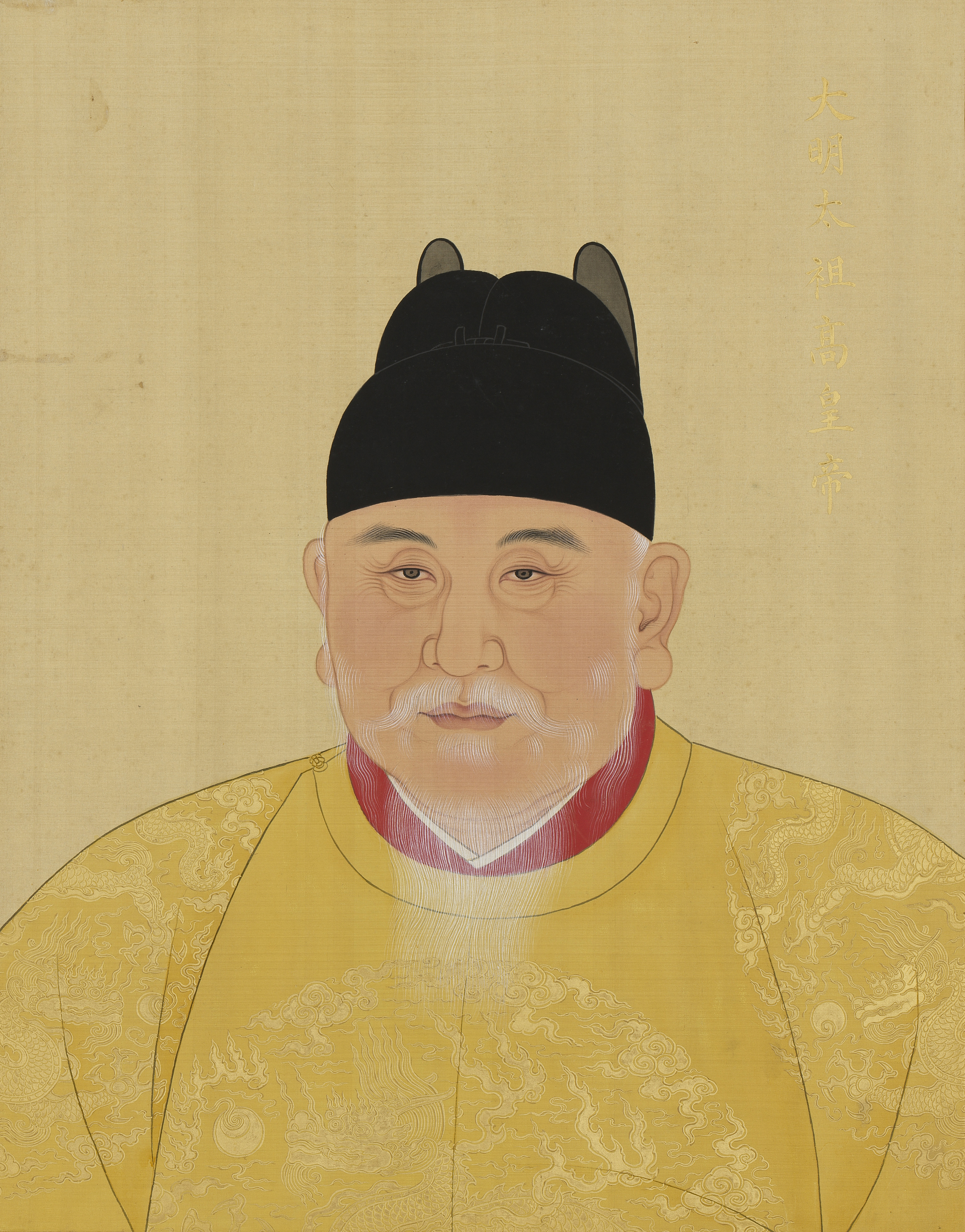
The Hongwu Emperor wearing a "winged shan hat" (yishanguan)

Although the Hongwu Emperor was a Confucian, he had a strong suspicion towards the scholar-official class and was not afraid to use physical punishment against them for their wrongdoings. In 1373, he eliminated the civil service examinations after 120 newly awarded jinshi degree holders (the highest degree, given to those who passed the palace examination) were found to only be capable of reciting memorized phrases. The examinations were later reinstated in 1384, but the chief examiner was executed when it was discovered that he had only given the jinshi degree to candidates from the southern region. The Emperor also sought to gradually impose strict regulations on nearly every aspect of his subjects' lives, including enforcing standards for greetings and written style, restricting personal naming practices, and prohibiting the use of symbols that reminded him of a monastic episode in his own life. (Note: In 1344, the Hongwu Emperor's parents and brother died during a plague epidemic. He was forced to join a nearby Buddhist monastery. For the next eight years, he alternated between living in the monastery and wandering the country, relying on begging for survival. In 1352, the Mongol army destroyed the monastery, leading the Hongwu Emperor to join the anti-Mongol rebels.) He sought to standardize headwear among his subjects as well. In 1370, he ordered all adult males to wear the "four-quarters pacification turban" (sifang pingding jin). Despite distributing sample turbans throughout the empire, the policy ultimately proved unsuccessful.

== Government, law, and military ==
At the outset of Ming rule, its administrative structure closely resembled that of the Tang and Song (7th–13th centuries), while incorporating certain institutional features inherited from the Yuan dynasty. (Note: The Tang government had three departments (sheng), each responsible for drafting, reviewing, and implementing policies. Beneath them were six ministries (bu), which oversaw personnel, revenue, rites, military affairs, justice, and public works. Together, these institutions formed the Three Departments and Six Ministries system, an administrative framework that remained the foundation of imperial governance until the fall of the Qing dynasty in 1912. Under the Yuan dynasty, the central government was organized around the Secretariat (Zhongshu Sheng), the Censorate (Yushitai), and the Bureau of Military Affairs (Shumi Yuan), which respectively handled civil administration, supervision, and military affairs. The Ming largely retained this tripartite division while modifying its institutional form.) However, this system resulted in the emperor being distanced from direct control and did not meet the Hongwu Emperor's expectations. The Emperor initiated a significant overhaul of the administrative system, with the main goal of centralizing power and increasing the ruler's personal authority. The first step was to reform local administration, followed by the central institutions and the highest military command.

In 1380, Chancellor Hu Weiyong was arrested on suspicion of involvement in a conspiracy against the Emperor. The Emperor abolished Hu's office and its subordinate secretariat, and personally assumed all executive power. In order to prevent any further attempts at overthrow by ministers or subjects, he established the Embroidered Uniform Guard, a secret police force made up of soldiers from his personal guard. Throughout the Hongwu era, numerous purges were carried out among officials and the general population, resulting in the deaths of tens of thousands of people. The Embroidered Uniform Guard was largely responsible for these deaths.

In 1364, the Ming dynasty began work on compiling a new Confucian legal code, known as the Great Ming Code. This code was largely based on the Tang Code of 653. The initial version was approved in 1367, and the final version was adopted in 1397. Although it was supplemented with additional provisions, it remained unchanged until the fall of the dynasty.

During the Hongwu era, the primary focus of the Ming military was to defend against the Mongol threat. The Ming achieved some success in campaigns against the Mongols until 1374, and again in 1378–1381 and 1387–1388. To reorganize the army, the Hongwu Emperor implemented the weisuo system, which was similar to the Tang dynasty's fubing system. This system allocated land to soldiers, allowing them to sustain themselves during periods between campaigns. However, it ultimately failed due to the inability to effectively self-supply provisions, leading to widespread desertion among units dependent on this method of provisioning.

== Conversion table ==
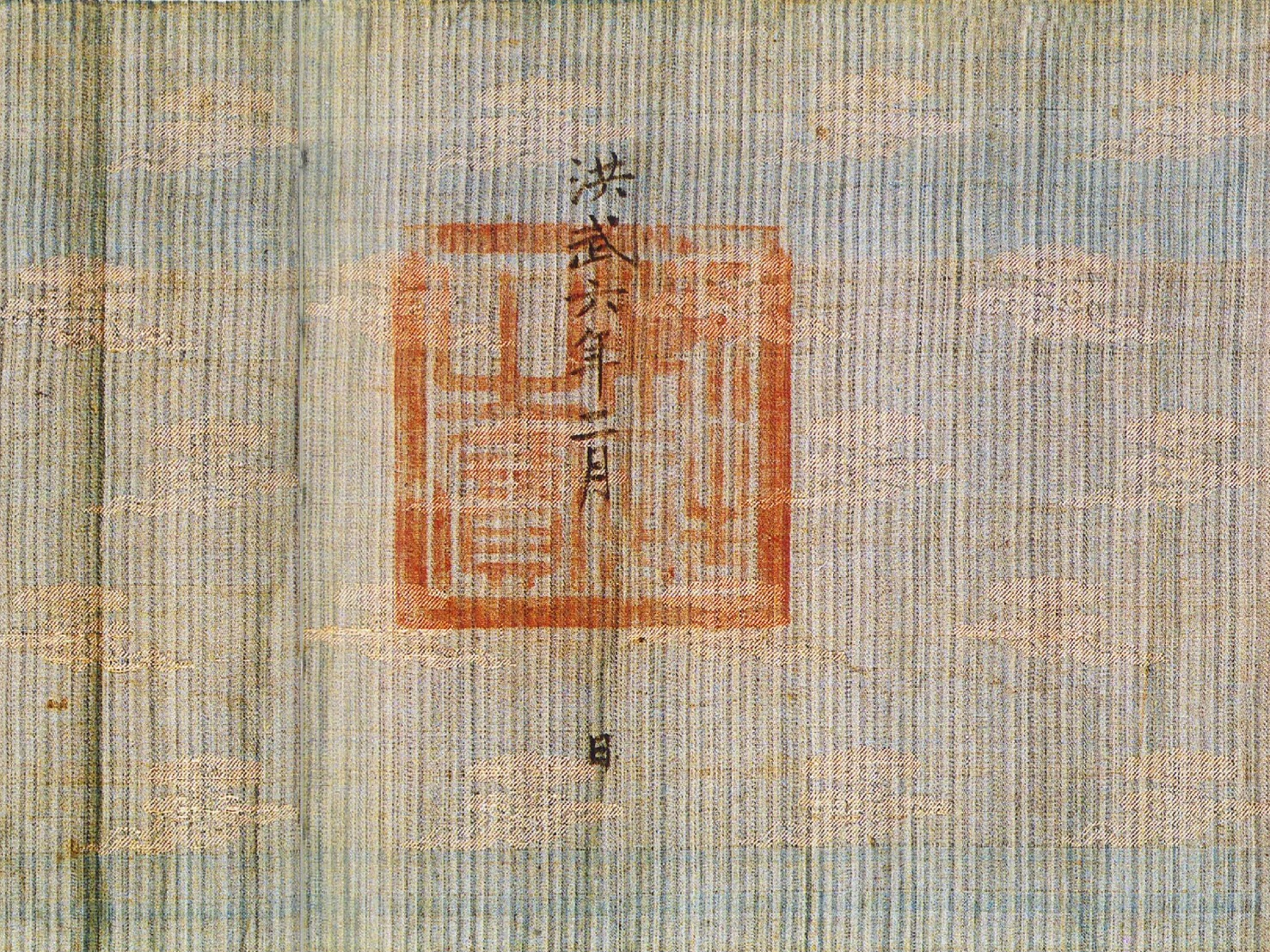
An imperial edict issued by the Hongwu Emperor concludes with the date "the second month of the sixth year of the Hongwu era" (洪武六年二月)

Hongwu	1	2	3	4	5	6	7	8	9	10
AD	1368	1369	1370	1371	1372	1373	1374	1375	1376	1377
Hongwu	11	12	13	14	15	16	17	18	19	20
AD	1378	1379	1380	1381	1382	1383	1384	1385	1386	1387
Hongwu	21	22	23	24	25	26	27	28	29	30
AD	1388	1389	1390	1391	1392	1393	1394	1395	1396	1397
Hongwu	31									
AD	1398									
