= Zhu Biao =

Crown Prince of China from 1368 to 1392

Zhu Biao 朱標
- Crown Prince of the Ming dynasty
- Born: 10 October 1355
- Died: 17 May 1392 (aged 36)
- Burial: Dong Mausoleum, Purple Mountain, Nanjing
- Consorts: Empress Xiaokang (m. 1371; died 1378); Lady Lü (before 1392)
- Issue Detail: Jianwen Emperor
Posthumous name
- Crown Prince Yiwen (Note: Chinese: 懿文太子 (bestowed by the Hongwu Emperor and later restored by the Yongle Emperor)); Emperor Xiaokang (Note: Chinese: 孝康皇帝 (conferred by the Jianwen Emperor and later restored by the Hongguang Emperor))
Temple name
- Xingzong (Note: Simplified Chinese: 兴宗; traditional Chinese: 興宗; pinyin: Xīngzōng)
- House: Zhu
- Father: Hongwu Emperor
- Mother: Empress Ma

Chinese name
- Traditional Chinese: 朱標
- Simplified Chinese: 朱标
Transcriptions
Standard Mandarin
- Hanyu Pinyin: Zhū Biāo
- Wade–Giles: Chu^{1} Piao^{1}
- IPA: [ʈʂú pʰjáʊ]

Zhu Biao (10 October 1355 – 17 May 1392) was the eldest son of the Hongwu Emperor, the founder of the Ming dynasty of China. Upon the establishment of the Ming dynasty in 1368, Zhu Biao was appointed heir to the throne. In order to prepare for his future reign, he received a comprehensive Confucian education, but he died at the age of thirty-six in 1392, during his father's lifetime. He was succeeded by his eldest surviving son, Zhu Yunwen, who ascended the throne six years later as the Jianwen Emperor.

== Biography ==
Zhu Biao was born on 10 October 1355 in Taiping (present-day Anhui), a stronghold on the south bank of the Yangtze River and then the seat of Zhu Yuanzhang (the future Hongwu Emperor), a leader of the Red Turban Rebellion in China during the late Yuan dynasty. He was the first son of Zhu Yuanzhang and his wife, Lady Ma. In 1364, when his father declared himself King of Wu, he named Zhu Biao as his heir (世子, shizi). In 1368, Zhu Yuanzhang proclaimed himself emperor of the Ming dynasty in Nanjing and named Zhu Biao heir to the throne (皇太子, Huang Taizi). As a young boy, he received an intensive education in Confucian teachings under the guidance of some of the best scholars, the most prominent of whom was Song Lian. He came to be seen as an educated and humane politician, resembling his mother in these qualities. After the establishment of the Ming, the Emperor placed great emphasis on Zhu Biao's education in preparation for his future role as sovereign, and he assigned many of his closest associates to supervise the heir's household, including the generals Xu Da and Chang Yuchun, as well as the official Li Shanchang. From 1377, he actively participated in the Emperor's meetings with ministers and played a role in the day-to-day management of the state.

Zhu Biao's first wife was the daughter of Chang Yuchun. They married in 1371 and had two sons, Zhu Xiongying (1374–1382) and Zhu Yuntong (1377–1417). His second wife was the daughter of Lü Ben (吕本; d. 1382), a Yuan official who had joined Zhu Yuanzhang early in his rise. They had three sons, Zhu Yunwen, Zhu Yunjian (d. 1402), and Zhu Yunxi (1391–1406).

In September 1391, Zhu Biao was sent to inspect Shaanxi Province, with the task of considering the relocation of the capital to Xi'an. The Emperor believed that Xi'an was more secure than Nanjing, the capital at the time. Zhu Biao returned from his journey in December, presenting a map of Shaanxi along with a memorial containing his observations on the region and other potential sites under consideration. His recommendations regarding the relocation of the capital are not known. He fell ill in January 1392 and died on 17 May. The nature of his illness is unknown. The Emperor was deeply grieved, and he neglected administrative responsibilities for a longer period than ritual custom required. In September, Zhu Biao was buried in Dong Mausoleum at the foot of Zhong Mountain on the outskirts of Nanjing.

During the mourning period for Zhu Biao, the Emperor discussed the succession with his advisors. On the recommendation of Liu Sanwu (劉三吾; 1312–1399), a Hanlin scholar, Zhu Yunwen was chosen as heir over the Emperor's second son and natural candidate, Zhu Shuang, the deceased heir's full brother. This decision was seen as preserving succession in Zhu Biao's line, and Zhu Yunwen, like his father, was inclined toward literature and civil governance, whereas Zhu Shuang was a man of arms. Zhu Yunwen was therefore expected to continue the trend of civilizing and moderating the government. Upon ascending the throne as the Jianwen Emperor, Zhu Yunwen posthumously honored his father as emperor. Zhu Di, Zhu Biao's fourth brother, later overthrew the Jianwen Emperor and abolished Zhu Biao's imperial status. It was not until two centuries later, in 1644, that Zhu Biao was once again posthumously promoted to emperor. (Note: According to Frederick W. Mote in the Dictionary of Ming Biography, 1368–1644, Zhu Biao was restored to imperial rank in 1595.)

== Notes ==
Zhu Biao House of Zhu Born: 10 October 1355 Died: 17 May 1392
Chinese royalty
New title Ming dynasty established	Crown Prince of the Ming dynasty 1368–1392	Vacant Title next held by Zhu Yunwen as Imperial Grandson-heir
New title Ming dynasty established	Crown Prince of the Ming dynasty 1368–1392	Vacant Title next held by Zhu Wenkui as Crown Prince
