= Jianwen Emperor =

Emperor of China from 1398 to 1402

Jianwen Emperor 建文帝

Emperor of the Ming dynasty
- Reign: 30 June 1398 – 13 July 1402
- Enthronement: 30 June 1398
- Predecessor: Hongwu Emperor
- Successor: Yongle Emperor
- Born: 5 December 1377
- Died: 13 July 1402 (aged 24) (Note: While the Yongle Emperor officially propagated 13 July 1402, as the Jianwen Emperor's death date, coinciding with the Imperial Palace's burning, the true fate of the emperor remained unknown. This led to persistent rumors that he had, in fact, survived and lived anonymously for many years as a Buddhist monk.)
- Spouse: Empress Xiaominrang (m. 1395)
- Issue: Zhu Wenkui, Crown Prince Hejian; Zhu Wengui, Prince of Runhuai
Era dates
- Jianwen: (Note: Chinese: 建文; pinyin: Jiànwén) 6 February 1399 – 13 July 1402 (Note: On 14 July 1402 the Jianwen era was officially abolished by the Yongle Emperor, and the former Hongwu era was reestablished until the beginning of Chinese New Year in 1403 when the Yongle era officially started.)
Posthumous name
- Emperor Sitian Zhangdao Chengyi Yuangong Guanwen Yangwu Keren Duxiao Rang (Note: Simplified Chinese: 嗣天章道诚懿渊功观文扬武克仁笃孝让皇帝; traditional Chinese: 嗣天章道誠懿淵功觀文揚武克仁篤孝讓皇帝 (conferred by the Hongguang Emperor in 1644)); Emperor Gongmin Hui (Note: Simplified Chinese: 恭闵惠皇帝; traditional Chinese: 恭閔惠皇帝 (conferred by the Qianlong Emperor in 1736))
Temple name
- Huizong (Note: Chinese: 惠宗; pinyin: Huìzōng (conferred by the Hongguang Emperor in 1644))
- House: Zhu
- Dynasty: Ming
- Father: Zhu Biao
- Mother: Lady Lü

Chinese name
- Chinese: 建文帝
Transcriptions
Standard Mandarin
- Hanyu Pinyin: Jiànwén Dì
- Wade–Giles: Chien^{4}-wên^{2} Ti^{4}
- IPA: [tɕjɛ̂n.wə̌n tî]

The Jianwen Emperor (5 December 1377 – 13 July 1402), personal name Zhu Yunwen, (Note: Chinese: 朱允炆; pinyin: Zhū Yǔnwén) was the second emperor of the Ming dynasty of China, reigning from 1398 to 1402. Zhu Yunwen's father was Zhu Biao, the eldest son and heir apparent of the Hongwu Emperor, the founder of the Ming dynasty. Zhu Biao died in 1392, after which the Hongwu Emperor named Zhu Yunwen as his successor. Zhu Yunwen ascended the throne after the Hongwu Emperor's death in June 1398.

Upon his accession, the Jianwen Emperor immediately began revising the Hongwu Emperor's reforms, with the most significant change being the attempt to limit or eliminate the power of princes who were sons of the Hongwu Emperor. Zhu Di, the most powerful of these princes, rebelled against the Jianwen Emperor in 1399. He did this under the pretext of acting against allegedly corrupt court officials who had influenced the Emperor, following the Emperor's order for the imprisonment of Zhu Di's own followers. This sparked a civil war known as the Jingnan campaign, which Zhu Di framed as an effort to eliminate disorder. In 1402, Zhu Di captured the capital of Nanjing, and the imperial palace was burned to the ground. Even though three bodies were found at the burnt palace and were later announced to be those of the Emperor, his wife, and their eldest son, rumors of the Emperor's survival and refuge in a Buddhist monastery emerged. Zhu Di ascended the throne as the Yongle Emperor. He abolished the Jianwen Emperor's reforms and declared his reign illegitimate, thus abolishing the Jianwen era and extending the era of Hongwu to 1402. It was not until 1595 that the Jianwen Emperor's era and imperial title were restored by the Wanli Emperor.

== Early life ==
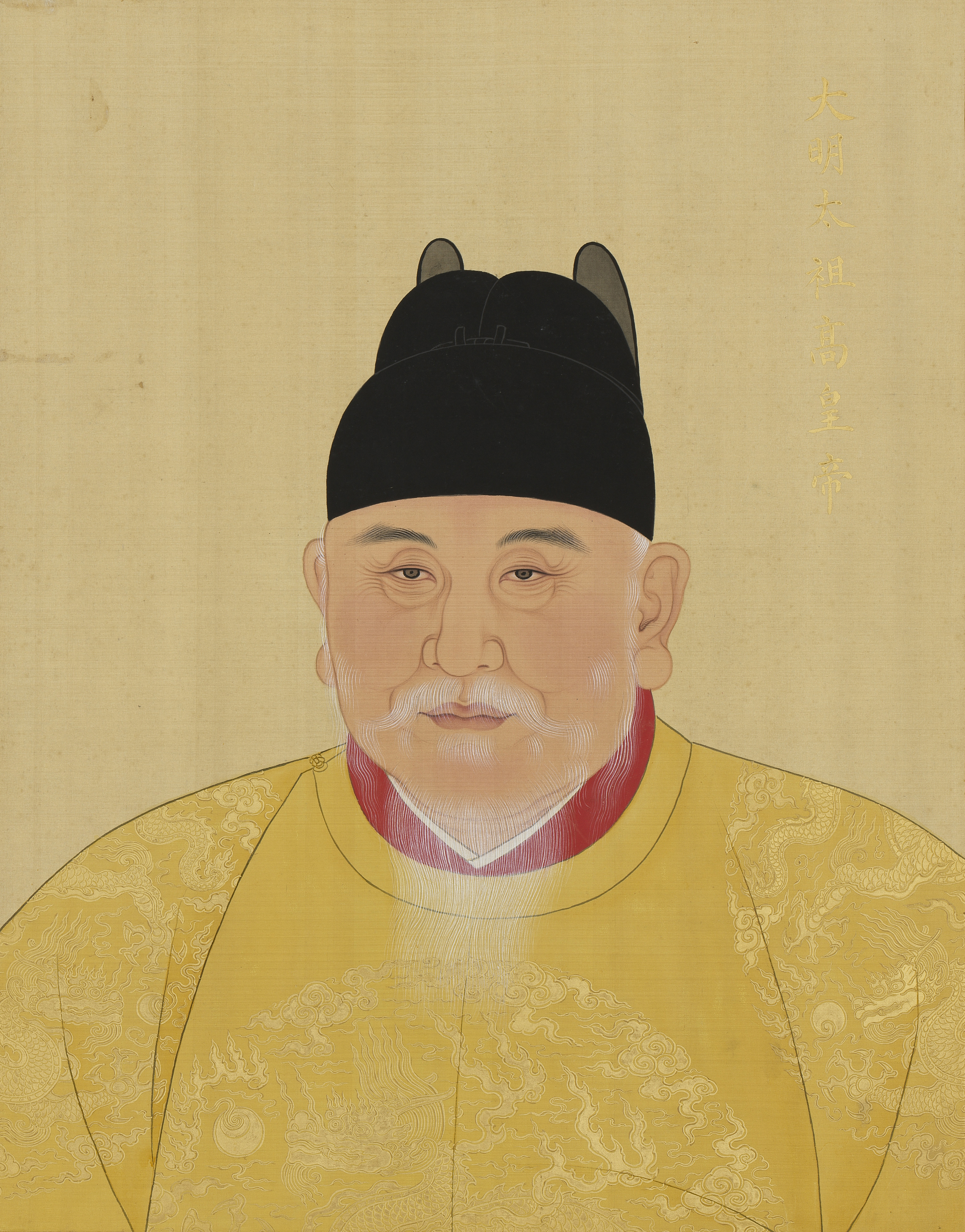
The Hongwu Emperor, the grandfather and predecessor of the Jianwen Emperor

Zhu Yunwen, the future Jianwen Emperor, was born on 5 December 1377 during the reign of his grandfather the Hongwu Emperor, who was the founder of China's Ming dynasty. He was the second son of Zhu Biao, who was the Emperor's eldest son and heir apparent. Zhu Yunwen's mother was Lady Lü. In 1382, the death of Zhu Yunwen's elder brother left him as the eldest surviving son of Zhu Biao. According to historian Chan Hok-lam, he was a mature and straightforward child, earning the favor of his grandfather.

In May 1392, Zhu Biao died at the age of thirty-seven after several months of illness, whereupon the court discussed his succession. The primogeniture viewpoint advocated by scholars from the Hanlin Academy and high officials prevailed, and as the eldest surviving son, Zhu Yunwen was named the new heir on 28 September 1392. He spent the next six years carefully preparing for his future role as emperor. Chan describes Zhu Yunwen as bookish and gentle, inheriting his father's moderate and reflective temperament. As heir, he criticized the Hongwu Emperor's excessively harsh laws and penal pronouncements, advocating for their abolition. Later historical accounts, often produced by scholars sympathetic to the deposed emperor, present him as a ruler who adhered to Confucian values, known for his virtuous character and his practice of ren (benevolence) and xiao (filial piety). The Hongwu Emperor had doubts about his grandson's ability to rule, believing he lacked toughness. To ensure a smooth transition for his heir, the Emperor carried out purges of officials in 1393 after the discovery of Lan Yu's conspiracy of treason, a campaign that resulted in the execution and banishment of thousands of people. In 1395, Zhu Yunwen married Lady Ma, and their eldest son, Zhu Wenkui, was born on 30 November 1396.

== Accession ==
The Hongwu Emperor died on 24 June 1398 and on 30 June, Zhu Yunwen ascended the throne. The era name of his reign, Jianwen, means "establishing civility" and represents a sharp change in tone from Hongwu ("vastly martial"), the era name of his grandfather's reign. Consistent with his Confucian principles, the Jianwen Emperor was deeply concerned about the harshness of his grandfather's policies and aimed to bring about significant changes in the political landscape. He relied on Confucian scholars such as Huang Zicheng, Qi Tai, and Fang Xiaoru for guidance, all of whom were idealistic reformers but lacked practical experience in governing the country. In 1399, the Emperor appointed his wife, Lady Ma, as empress and designated their son, Zhu Wenkui, as his heir. Two years later, the Empress gave birth to their second son, Zhu Wengui.

== Reforms ==
During the reign of the Jianwen Emperor, the civilian part of the administration gained more influence. The ministers were elevated from the second rank to the first in the hierarchy of rank classes, placing them on equal footing with the highest-ranking generals (the military commissioners). After the abolition of the Central Secretariat in 1380, (Note: In 1380, Chancellor Hu Weiyong was accused of treason and executed, and in an attempt to consolidate the Emperor's authority, the Hongwu Emperor abolished the Central Secretariat, which served as Hu's base of power.) there had been no central office in the Ming administration to coordinate the work of ministries and other civil offices. All of these offices were therefore directly under the Emperor's control. The Jianwen Emperor relied on Huang, Qi, and Fang to lead the government. Although they effectively acted as chancellors (丞相; chengxiang), they did not hold the official title. This was a formal gesture to adhere to the Hongwu Emperor's Ancestral Injunctions, which had strictly forbidden the restoration of the chancellery due to concerns about the potential threat from the chancellor's authority and autonomy.

The number of departments and officials in the ministries was changed, and the offices and personnel of the Hanlin Academy and the Imperial University were substantially expanded under the Jianwen Emperor. He also strengthened the influence of Hanlin scholars in educating princes by creating new positions in the Household Administration of the Heir Apparent. A series of changes was made to the titles and structure of offices, following the patterns of the ancient Zhou dynasty (c. 1046 – 256 BC).

The Jianwen Emperor reduced the excessive land taxes imposed on Jiangnan, specifically Suzhou and Songjiang prefectures. For example, Suzhou prefecture, despite accounting for merely 1.1% of the empire's land, was subjected to a tax of 2.81 million dan of grain in 1393. This amount represented a disproportionate 9.5% of the empire's total tax of 29.4 million dan. In 1400, land taxes in Nanzhili and Zhejiang were curtailed. The following year, the Emperor further reformed the system by limiting the amount of tax-exempt land for Taoist and Buddhist clergy, compelling them to surrender any land exceeding a specified amount for redistribution to the needy. However, the government did not have sufficient time to fully implement these comprehensive changes before its fall.

=== Reduction of the princes' power ===
The Jianwen government aimed to reduce the influence of the Emperor's uncles, the sons of the Hongwu Emperor, especially Zhu Di, Prince of Yan; Zhu Su, Prince of Zhou; Zhu Gui, Prince of Dai; Zhu Bo, Prince of Xiang; Zhu Fu, Prince of Qi; and Zhu Pian, Prince of Min. Their father had granted them the title of prince (王; wang), along with significant income and privileges. They were stationed in various provinces and each commanded three auxiliary army units, which could range from 3,000 to 15,000 men. The most powerful and eldest among them was Zhu Di, the fourth son of the Hongwu Emperor. The princes saw the Jianwen Emperor's efforts as a personal threat and a violation of the Hongwu Emperor's Ancestral Injunctions, which everyone, including the Emperor, was obliged to obey.

The policy of "reducing the feudatories" (削藩; xuefan) was supported by Qi and Huang, who cited past dynastic experiences, such as the Rebellion of the Seven States during the Han dynasty. Princedoms were either directly abolished or had their powers limited for both real and perceived offenses. The government also forbade the princes from participating in public affairs.

The first victim of the new order was Zhu Su, based in Kaifeng, a city in central China, and a close friend of Zhu Di. In the fall of 1398, the Jianwen Emperor stripped him of his title and exiled him to the southeastern Chinese province of Yunnan. However, Zhu Su was subsequently brought back to Nanjing, where his coerced testimony amplified charges of a princely conspiracy. This resulted in the house arrest of Zhu Gui in Datong in February 1399, and directly caused Zhu Bo to set fire to his own palace in Jingzhou, burning himself and his family to death on 1 June 1399. In the following two months, in June and July, Zhu Fu (based in Qingzhou) and Zhu Pian (based in Yunnan) were also stripped of their titles. The main target of the government's measures was Zhu Di. He was based in Beijing and had shown himself to be a capable military leader and energetic administrator during campaigns against the Mongols. After he was passed over as successor in 1392, he considered himself unjustly neglected.

== Civil war ==
From 1399 to 1402, the Jianwen Emperor was engaged in a civil war against his uncle, Zhu Di, which nearly led to the destruction of the newly established dynasty. The conflict ended when Zhu Di's army overwhelmed the capital; he then ascended the throne as the Yongle Emperor, while the Jianwen Emperor was reported to have died in the palace fire.

=== Conflict with Zhu Di ===
The Jianwen Emperor's government was cautious towards Zhu Di, which gave him the opportunity to prepare and gather forces, although his power was systematically limited. Fifteen thousand men under Zhu Di's command were transferred outside of Beijing. Meanwhile, several military units with ties to him were redeployed to distant locations, and loyalist commanders were stationed at key strategic points surrounding his princedom.

In June 1399, the Emperor finally granted Zhu Di's request to return his sons, who had been in Nanjing since the Hongwu Emperor's funeral, to Beijing. This event removed Zhu Di's inhibitions. The immediate pretext for his rebellion was the arrest of two of his lower officials on charges of sedition. With the support of Beijing's provincial dignitaries, Zhu Di responded by launching military offensives against several neighboring counties and prefectures around Beijing, marking the beginning of the war later called the Jingnan campaign—a campaign to clear away disorders.

Zhu Di justified his actions by stating his desire to end internal disorder and confusion, defend the Hongwu Emperor's Ancestral Injunctions that defined the duties of princes, and honor his deceased father. He accused the Jianwen Emperor and his ministers of falsely charging him with making military preparations against the throne. He presented his rebellion as a reasonable act of self-defense. He also stated that he had no interest in the throne, but as the eldest surviving son of the deceased founder of the dynasty, he felt obligated to restore the law and legality that had been subverted by the Emperor's advisors and ministers, whom he described as treacherous and wicked.

=== Course of the war ===
Map showing the troops' movements during the Jingnan campaign

At the beginning of the war, Zhu Di had a force of 100,000 men and held authority only within his fief in Beijing. In contrast, the Ming government had three times the number of soldiers and significantly more resources, but the government's superiority was not as clear-cut as it seemed. Zhu Di was a decisive and exceptionally capable commander, leading elite units that included a large number of Mongol cavalry. This contrasted with the imperial party, which was weakened by the indecision and poor coordination of its commanders, and by the court's focus on administrative reorganization rather than the urgent demands of the war.

In August 1399, the Emperor appointed Geng Bingwen as the commander of the troops tasked with suppressing the rebellion. Geng led 130,000 troops to Zhending, a city southwest of Beijing, but was ultimately defeated by Zhu Di in late September, resulting in heavy losses for the imperial army. Upon Geng's defeat, Li Jinglong replaced him as the new commander of the imperial army and took advantage of Zhu Di's absence from Beijing to lay siege to the city in November 1399. Zhu Di quickly returned and forced the imperial army to retreat.

In 1400, there were numerous rebel attacks and government army counterattacks. The Emperor, who was dissatisfied with Li Jinglong, dismissed him and appointed Sheng Yong as the new commander of the anti-rebellion forces. Zhu Di, following the advice of his supporters in Nanjing, opted for a war of attrition. He employed guerrilla tactics, launching diversionary attacks and feints in the southern part of Beizhili and in western Shandong from the autumn of 1400 to the spring of 1401, while he sought routes to the south that would avoid the fortified strongholds.

The government army used firearms and rocket weapons to kill tens of thousands of rebels at Dongchang in Shandong in January 1401. During the retreat to Beijing, Zhu Di narrowly escaped capture. In late February, the rebels launched an attack, and they crushed the government armies in April. The Emperor dismissed Qi and Huang on 17 April and appointed Ru Chang in Qi's place. Together with Ru, Li Jinglong also emerged as a leader of the peace faction at court. The insurgents continued to raid the enemy's supply lines throughout the summer, while the fronts in Shandong and southern Beizhili were moving back and forth.

Zhu Di launched an offensive in January 1402. On the advice of the Nanjing eunuchs, he advanced westward instead of through the fortified cities along the Grand Canal, where the government forces were stronger. This strategic decision proved successful as the government forces in the west were weaker, allowing the rebels to disrupt their lines. The government's attempt to stop the rebel advance by sending reinforcements led by Xu Huizu to the north failed. The rebels continued their southward march, and captured Xuzhou, a city in northwestern Nanzhili, by the beginning of March. The government was forced to withdraw its troops from Beijing and Shandong to defend Nanzhili.

=== Fall of Nanjing and aftermath ===
From April to June 1402, the rebel army engaged in fierce battles and successfully advanced from Xuzhou to the banks of the Yangtze River. Chen Xuan, the commander of the government fleet, defected to the rebels, giving them an open road to Nanjing. The Emperor, who was gathering forces to defend the capital, was unable to stop the rebels. Taking advantage of the chaos, Li Jinglong opened the gates of Nanjing to the rebels on 13 July 1402. In the ensuing clashes, the imperial palace was burned down. Three bodies found at the burnt palace were later announced to be those of the Emperor, his wife, and their eldest son.

Zhu Di ascended the throne as the Yongle Emperor on 17 July, presenting himself as the direct successor of the Hongwu Emperor. He denied legitimacy to his overthrown nephew and canceled his reforms. The Jianwen Emperor's younger son, Zhu Wengui, and several other relatives were imprisoned. (Note: Zhu Wengui was released out of compassion in 1457 by Emperor Yingzong, who had also been under house arrest from 1450 to 1457. Zhu Wengui did not enjoy his freedom for long, as he died after a few days.) His closest advisors, including Qi and Huang, were executed, and those connected to them were punished. Although the Yongle Emperor hoped that Fang, known for his integrity and honesty, would join his side and bring confidence to the new government, Fang resolutely rejected. As punishment, the Emperor not only executed Fang's relatives but also his pupils. The purges, executions, imprisonments, and exiles affected tens of thousands of people.

== Legacy ==
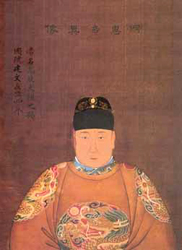
After ascending the throne, the Yongle Emperor systematically erased the legacy of his predecessor, the Jianwen Emperor. He abolished the Jianwen era, executed many of the former ministers, and falsified historical records. No official portrait of the Jianwen Emperor survived. This portrait, The Portrait of Emperor Hui of Ming, was created during the Qing dynasty, long after his overthrow.

In an attempt to erase the memory of the Jianwen Emperor, the era of Jianwen was retroactively canceled and the era of Hongwu was extended from 1399 to 1402. Many official documents from his government were destroyed, and surviving private accounts were proscribed. Historians' views on the Jianwen Emperor during the Yongle Emperor's reign were closely tied to the legitimacy of his own rule, and they also criticized his reforms for deviating from the principles of the dynasty's founder.

The official history of the Hongwu Emperor's reign, known as Taizu Shilu ("Veritable Records of Emperor Taizu"), was first compiled in 1402 during the reign of the Jianwen Emperor, but it was rewritten in 1403 and again between 1411 and 1418. The Yongle Emperor's historians portrayed the Jianwen Emperor as unfilial and neglectful of his duties, accusing him of treason and charging him and his advisors with profligacy and immorality. The Wanli Emperor restored his reign to the official history of the dynasty in October 1595, but it was not until July 1644 that the Hongguang Emperor of the Southern Ming dynasty gave him a temple name. The Hongguang Emperor bestowed upon him the temple name Huizong (惠宗; 'Magnanimous Ancestor') and the posthumous name Emperor Rang (讓皇帝; 'Abdicated Emperor'). However, the Qing dynasty, which succeeded the Ming, did not recognize the Hongguang Emperor as legitimate and did not consider his decisions valid. In September 1736, the Qianlong Emperor of the Qing dynasty granted the Jianwen Emperor the posthumous name Emperor Gongmin Hui (恭閔惠皇帝).

Beginning in the Jiajing era (1522–1567), non-state historians who were sympathetic to the Jianwen Emperor propagated a folk legend in their writings that he survived the palace fire and lived in anonymity as a Buddhist monk. In popular memory, his mysterious disappearance gave rise to numerous tales expressing sympathy for his tragic fate and veiled criticism of authoritarian rule. Some late Ming and early Qing rebel leaders even claimed descent from him to legitimize their movements.

== Family ==
- Empress Xiaominrang (孝愍讓皇后) of the Ma clan (馬氏; 1378–1402)
  - Zhu Wenkui (朱文奎), Crown Prince Hejian (和簡皇太子; 30 November 1396 – 1402), first son
  - Zhu Wengui (朱文圭), Prince of Runhuai (潤懷王; 1401–1457), second son

== See also ==
- Chinese emperors family tree (late)
- List of people who disappeared

== Notes ==
Jianwen Emperor House of Zhu Born: 5 December 1377
Regnal titles
Preceded by Hongwu Emperor	Emperor of the Ming dynasty 30 June 1398 – 13 July 1402	Succeeded by Yongle Emperor
Chinese royalty
New title	Imperial Grandson-heir of the Ming dynasty 1392–1398	Vacant Title next held by Zhu Zhanji
