= Huang-Ming Zuxun =

1373 Ming Dynasty text

Ancestral Instructions of Imperial Ming
- Traditional Chinese: 皇眀祖訓
- Simplified Chinese: 皇明祖训
Transcriptions
Standard Mandarin
- Hanyu Pinyin: Huáng Míng Zǔ Xùn
- Wade–Giles: Huang-Ming-Tsu-Hsün
- IPA: [xwǎŋ mǐŋ t͡sù ɕŷn]

Record of the Ancestor's Instructions
- Traditional Chinese: 祖訓錄
- Simplified Chinese: 祖训录
Transcriptions
Standard Mandarin
- Hanyu Pinyin: Zǔ xùn lù

The Huang-Ming Zuxun (Chinese: 皇明祖訓, Ancestral Instructions of Imperial Ming) were admonitions and exhortations left by the Hongwu Emperor, the founder of the Ming dynasty, to his descendants. The text was composed in 1373 under the title Record of the Ancestor's Instructions; this was changed to Huang Ming Zu Xun during the publication of the 1395 edition.

The book was divided into thirteen sections:

1. Preface (箴戒, Zhēnjiè)
2. Harem (持守, Chíshǒu)
3. Ritual Observance (嚴祭祀, Yán Jìsì)
4. Risk management (謹岀入, Jǐn Chūrù)
5. National Policy (慎國政, Shèn Guózhèng)
6. Protocol (禮儀, Lǐyí)
7. Legislation (法律, Fǎlǜ)
8. The Inner Chambers (內令, Nèilìng)
9. Eunuch (內官, Nèiguān)
10. Administration (職制, Zhízhì)
11. Guards (兵衛, Bīngwèi)
12. Public Works (營繕, Yíngshàn)
13. Public Funds (供用, Gōngyòng)

The preface, composed by Zhu Yuanzhang himself, admonishes his descendants to exert a strict Legalist government. The work pins the survival of the dynasty principally on personal austerity and watchfulness—both over the practical administration of the empire, the niceties of ritual and etiquette on various occasions, and over various potential traitors, including their relatives, spouses, and officials, both military and civil.

== Foreign policy ==
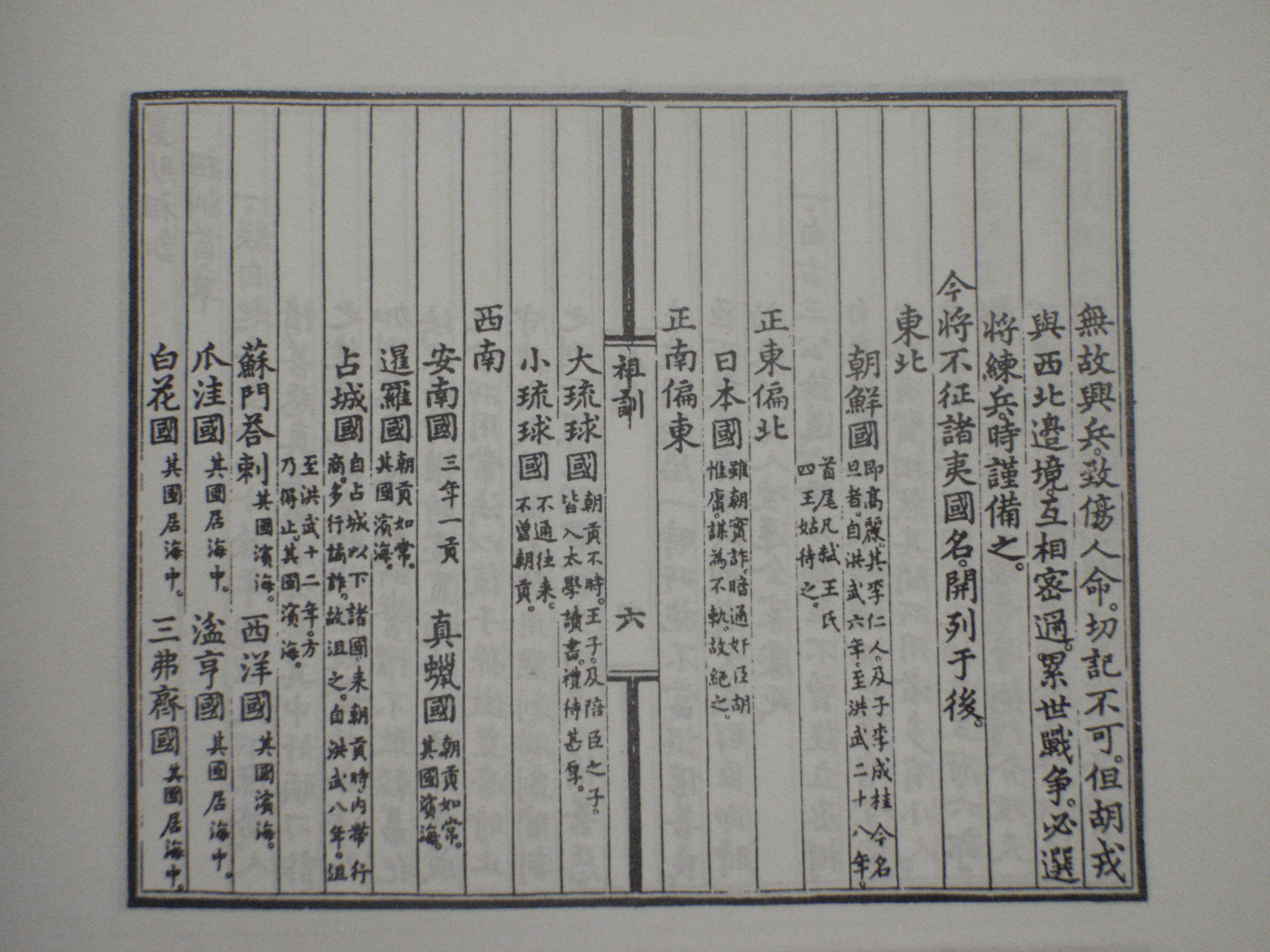
The countries to not be invaded (不征之國).

In the preface of the section (祖訓首章) the Hongwu Emperor stated a policy that he would not conquer 15 neighbouring countries in order to maintain harmonious tributary relations with these countries and at the same time promote the development of trade between countries. (Note: Full text: 一，四方諸夷，皆限山隔海，僻在一隅；得其地不足以供給，得其民不足以使令。若其自不揣量、來擾我邊，則彼為不祥。彼既不為中國患，而我興兵輕伐，亦不祥也。吾恐後世子孫，倚中國富強，貪一時戰功，無故興兵，致傷人命，切記不可。但胡戎與西北邊境，互相密邇，累世戰爭，必選將練兵，時謹備之。 今將不征諸夷國名，開列於後：)

Accordingly, he created a list of countries not be invaded (不征之國) (Note: simplified Chinese: 不征之国; traditional Chinese: 不征之國; pinyin: Bù zhēng zhī guó), listed by locations are compared to Nanjing, then capital of the Ming Dynasty:

- Northeast: Joseon (朝鮮國)
- Directly east by the north: Japan (日本國)
- Directly south by the east: "Great Ryukyu Kingdom" (大琉球國) and "Little Ryukyu Kingdom" (小琉球國)
- Southwest: Trần dynasty ("Annam", 安南國), Khmer Empire ("Chenla", 真臘國), Ayutthaya Kingdom ("Siam", 暹羅國), Champa (占城國), Sumendala (蘇門答剌), Pandya dynasty (西洋國), Majapahit or Sunda Kingdom ("Java", 爪洼國), Old Pahang Kingdom (彭亨國), Battak (白花國), Melayu Kingdom ("Srivijaya", 三弗齊國), Bruneian Sultanate (渤泥國).
