= Ming Palace =

14th-century palace in Nanjing, China

Coordinates: 32°02′17″N 118°49′03″E

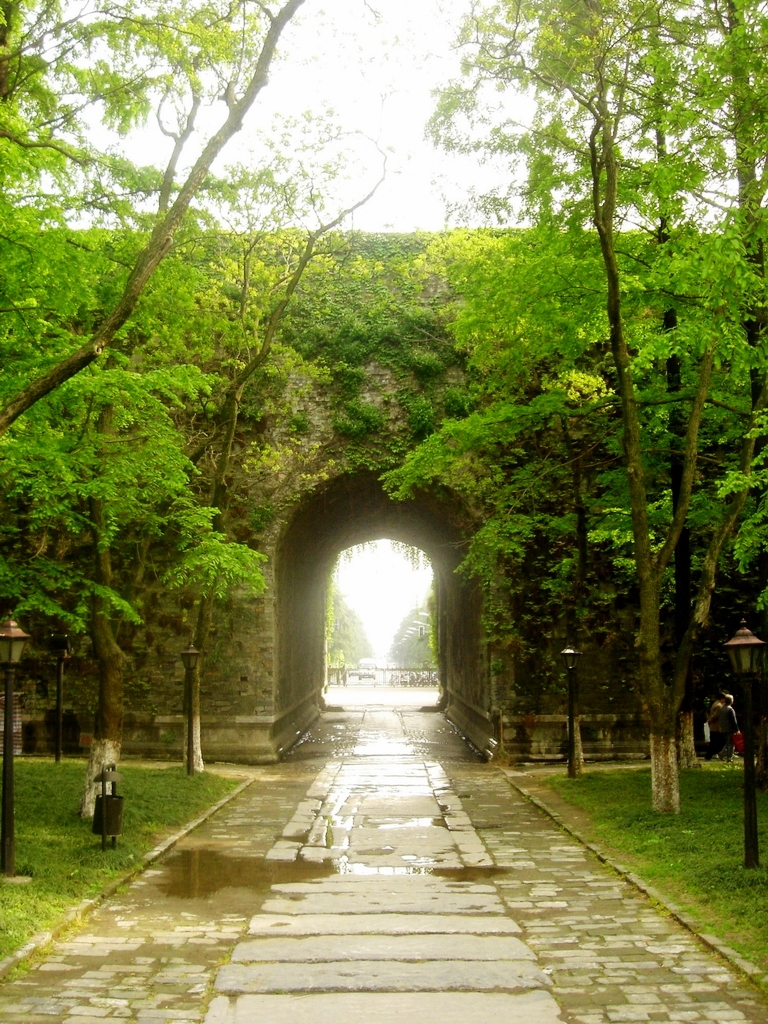
The Meridian Gate (front gate) of the Ming Palace, viewed from the northern (inner) side.

The Ming Palace (Chinese: 明故宫; pinyin: Míng Gùgōng; lit. 'Ming Former Palace'), also known as the "Forbidden City of Nanjing", was the 14th-century imperial palace of the early Ming dynasty, when Nanjing was the capital of China.

== History ==
=== 14th century ===
Zhu Yuanzhang, who became the founder and first Emperor of the Ming dynasty, began building a palace in what was then known as Jiankang in 1367. At the time, he was self-styled "King of Wu". The palace was built outside the existing city of Jiankang, and was completed by 1368. With its completion, Zhu proclaimed the Ming dynasty; with himself as the first emperor, known as the Hongwu Emperor; and that Jiankang, now Yingtian, was the "southern capital" ("nanjing") of his empire. For the next few years, few changes were made to the palace in Nanjing as the Emperor focused on building the "middle capital", located in his home town of Fengyang.

In 1373 the Hongwu Emperor shifted his focus back to Nanjing, with a substantial program of expansion and refurbishment of the palace which was completed in 1375. Further expansion occurred in 1392. In 1398 the Hongwu Emperor died, and was succeeded by his grandson, the Jianwen Emperor. A civil war soon ensued as Zhu Di, son of the Hongwu Emperor and uncle of the Jianwen Emperor, sought to take the crown from his nephew.

=== 15th—18th centuries ===
In 1402, Zhu Di took Nanjing and ascended the throne as the Yongle Emperor. The Jianwen Emperor disappeared amid a fire at the imperial Ming Palace.

The Yongle Emperor was keen to return to Beiping (now Beijing), where he was enfeoffed as a prince. To accomplish this, he raised Beiping to the status of a second capital, adding a Jing suffix to its name - Beiping therefore became the "northern capital", Beijing. Zhu Di began building a palace in Beijing. The Nanjing palace lost its position as the emperor's main residence to Beijing's Forbidden City in 1420 when the Yongle Emperor officially relocated the imperial capital to Beijing. Nanjing retained the status of the "reserve" capital throughout the almost three centuries of the Ming era, with its own "reserve" court and "reserve" ministries, and the palace was placed in the care of officials of the Imperial Household Department. However, the palace was afflicted with a series of fires, which caused damages that were, for the most part, not repaired. In 1449, the three main halls of the Outer Court (the ceremonial seat of government) burned down and were never rebuilt. Other fires destroyed other parts of the palace.

After the fall of Beijing to Li Zicheng's rebels (and, soon thereafter, to the Qing dynasty) in 1644, the Nanjing Ming Palace briefly became the seat of the Prince of Fu, who was crowned the "Hongguang Emperor" in Nanjing in an attempt to continue the Ming dynasty (one of a series of short-lived regimes known collectively as the Southern Ming dynasty). By this time only a small portion of the palace was intact, and the Hongguang Emperor set about rebuilding some sections of the palace.

However, the following year (1645) the Qing armies reached Nanjing. The Hongguang Emperor fled and officials of the "reserve" court surrendered. Under the Qing dynasty, the former imperial sector of Nanjing was garrisoned by the Manchu armies of the Eight Banners, with the palace itself becoming the yamen of two military commands. Throughout the Qing dynasty, the Ming palace was gradually demolished, with stone and carvings taken away to be used as building material and decorative elements on other projects.

By the time of the Kangxi Emperor and the Qianlong Emperor's tours of Nanjing in the 17th and 18th centuries, the Ming palace was already in ruin, and the two emperors both stayed elsewhere in the city.

=== 19th century ===
When the Taiping Revolution leaders declared Nanjing to be the capital of their Taiping Heavenly Kingdom, they chose not to restore the Ming Palace, but to build a new Palace of the Heavenly King. In this process, they sourced a large amount of construction material from the remains of the Ming Palace, until almost nothing remained of the buildings and walls. When the Taiping Revolution was defeated, the Qing troops razed the new palace in 1864, and built new traditional-style government buildings on that site.

=== 20th century ===
The Republic of China (1912-49) established Nanjing as its capital in 1928, and transformed one of the Qing buildings into the Presidential Palace. The planned development of the capital called for a new central executive zone to be built, around the Presidential Palace, on the former Ming Palace complex grounds. The plan was never completed. In 1929, a major road, present day East Zhongshan Road, was built in an east–west direction across the palace complex site, dividing it into northern and a southern portions.

In the 1930s, a series of buildings were built in and around the northern portion of the palace complex site, including the offices of two Kuomintang party organs, in a "neo-classical" style referencing traditional palace architecture, placed symmetrically near the old east and west palace gates. The National Central Museum, the present day Nanjing Museum building, was also built in the northern section. The southern portion became a small airstrip. The building of the airstrip resulted in the demolition of the two protruding arms of the Meridian Gate, the impressive former front gate of the Ming Palace complex.

== The Ming Palace today ==
No building within the palace survives today. Among other structures, the gate platforms of the Meridian Gate (the southern, front gate of the palace), Donghua Gate (the Gate of Eastern Glory, the eastern gate of the palace), and the Xi'an Gate (the Gate of Western Peace, the western outer gate of the palace) survive, though none of the wooden gatehouses survive, and the protruding wings of the Meridian Gate have been demolished. The inner and outer bridges of the Golden Water, which lie on the main north–south axis just inside and just outside the front gate respectively, survive. A number of isolated column elements and stone carvings also survive, and a number of foundations have been excavated.

The site of the three halls of the Outer Court has been established as a commemorative park, while the area around the Meridian Gate is also a park. Many of the remaining stone carvings and architectural components of the palace have been moved to the latter park and are arranged for display.

Large parts of the former palace are now occupied by various agencies and organisations such as the Aeronautical and Aerospace University of Nanjing, the Archives of the Nanjing Military District, and the No. 2 Historical Archives of China.

== Transportation ==
The palace is accessible from Minggugong Station of Nanjing Metro.

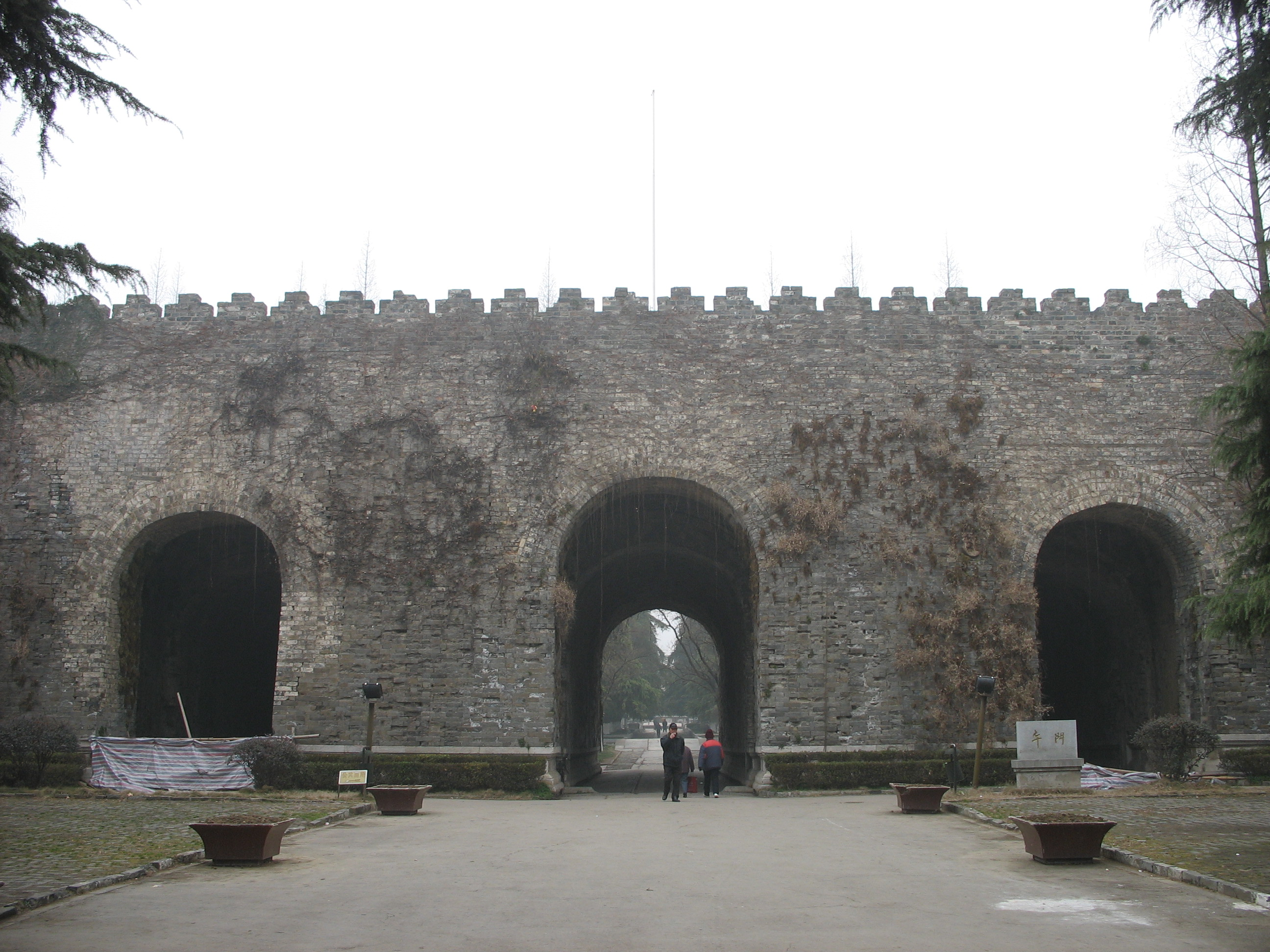
The Meridian Gate viewed from the southern, outer side

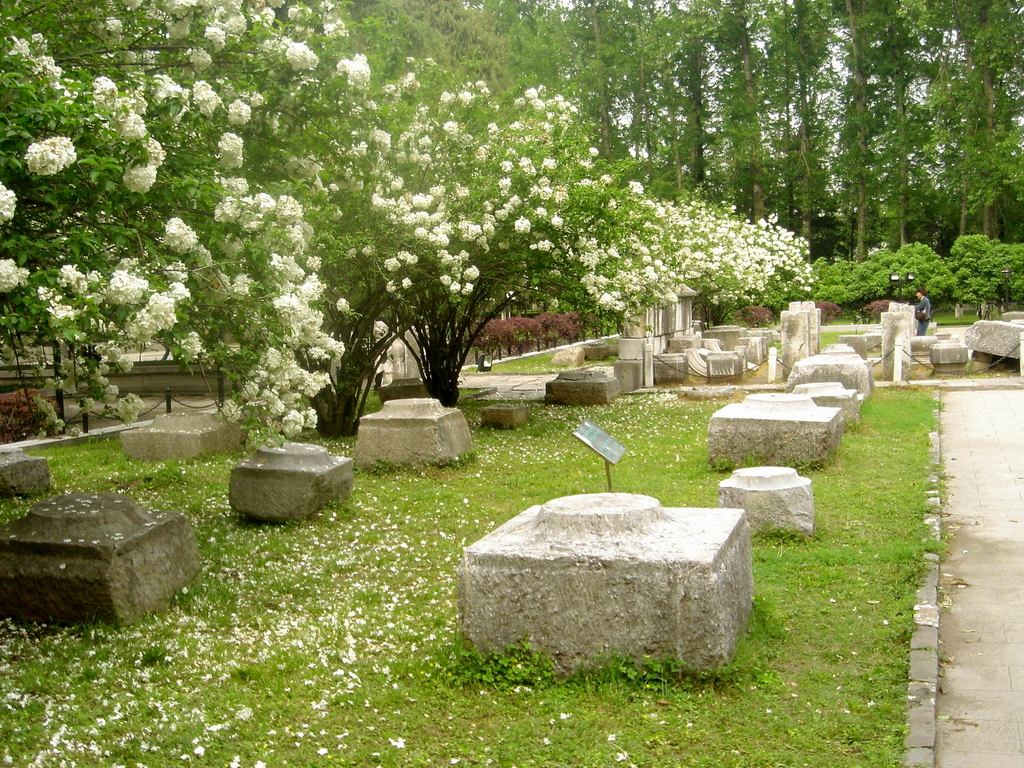
Column bases

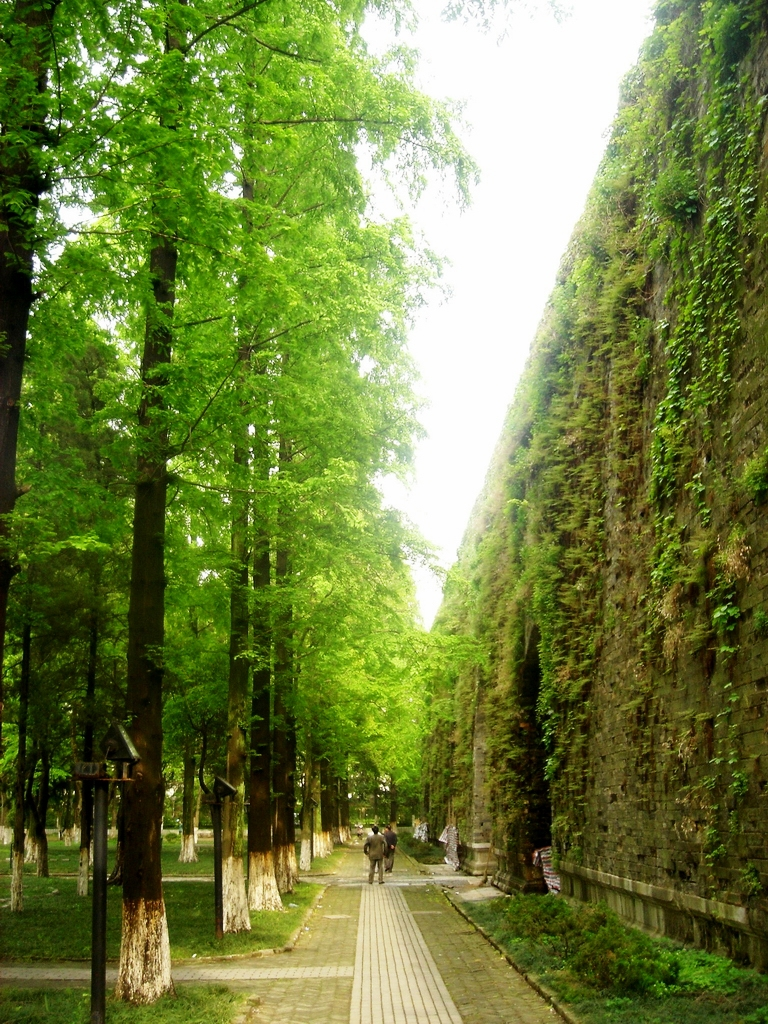
Inside the Meridian Gate park

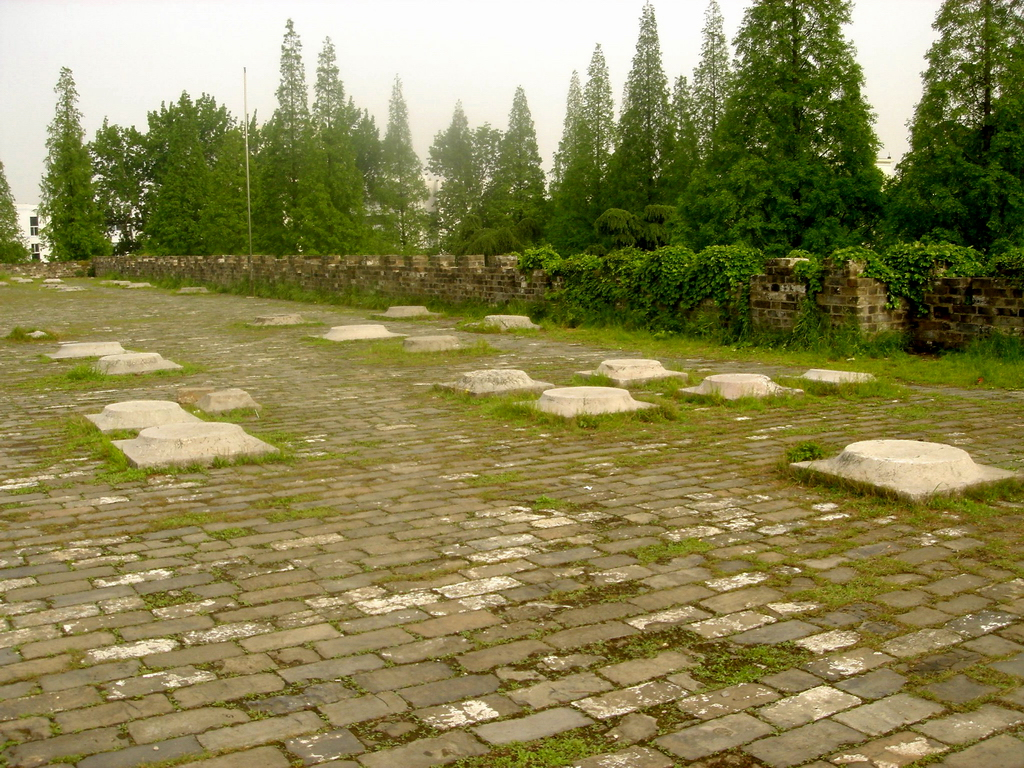
Column bases

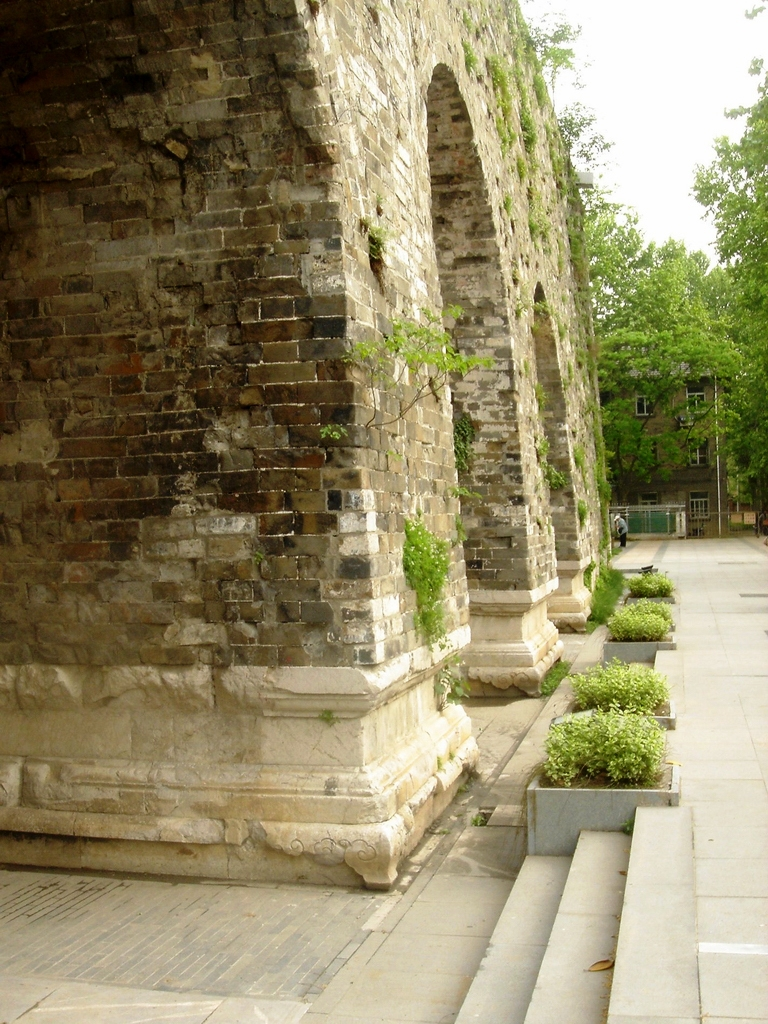
Donghua Gate (east gate)

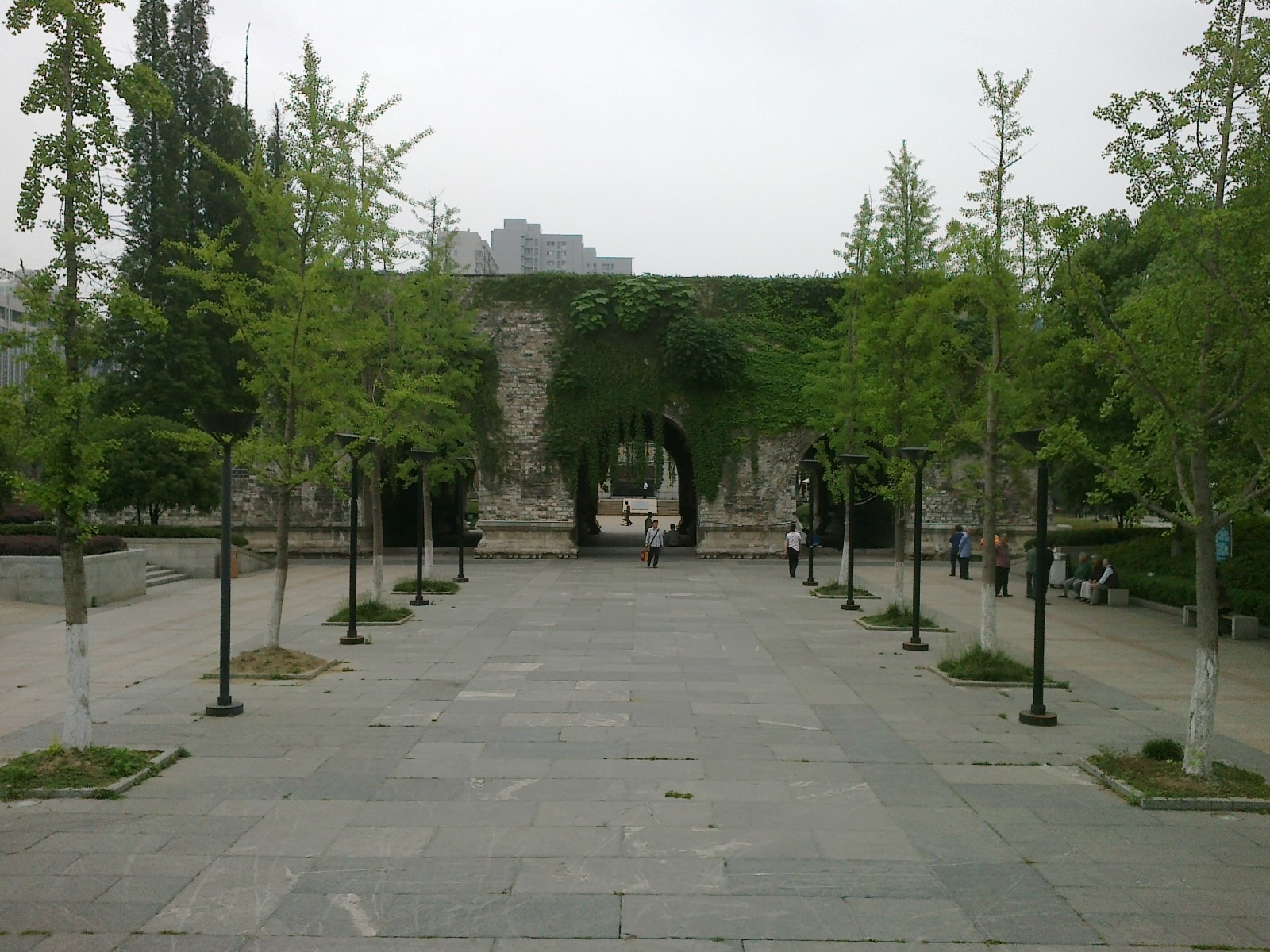
Xi'an Gate (outer west gate)

== See also ==
- Ming Palace in Beijing
