= Ming Dynasty (2019 TV series) =

- Promotional poster
- Also known as: Empress of the Ming
- 大明风华
- Genre: Historical drama
- Based on: The Chronicle of the Six Eras by Lianjing Zhuyi
- Written by: An Jian; Daijin; Zhang Ting
- Directed by: Zhang Ting
- Starring: Tang Wei; Zhu Yawen; Deng Jiajia; Lay Zhang
- Opening theme: "One Heart" (一次心) by Henry Huo
- Ending theme: "One Heart" (一次心) by Henry Huo
- Country of origin: China
- Original language: Mandarin
- No. of episodes: 62

Production
- Producer: Yao Yuzhu
- Production locations: Hengdian World Studios; Wuxi; Inner Mongolia
- Running time: ≈45 minutes per episode
- Production companies: Youku; Ruyi Films; Yuekai Media

Original release
- Network: Hunan Television
- Release: 17 December 2019 – 23 January 2020

Ming Dynasty (大明风华) is a 2019 Chinese historical television series romanticising the life of Empress Sun, an empress consort of the Xuande Emperor of the Ming dynasty. Starring Tang Wei and Zhu Yawen, it aired on Hunan Television until 2020. Loosely adapted from the novel The Chronicle of the Six Eras (六朝纪事) by Lianjing Zhuyi (莲静竹衣), the series gained much attention and viewership from non-Chinese viewers after it achieved high ratings in mainland China.

== Synopsis ==
After a successful insurrection against Jianwen Emperor, the Yongle Emperor orders the execution of many high-ranking officials of the court loyal to his deposed predecessor. Among them is the royal doctor Jing Qing, whose entire family is condemned alongside him. His two daughters escape and are separated in the process.

The younger daughter is adopted by a high ranking inner court attendant named Hu and renamed Hu Shanxiang. The elder daughter is rescued and adopted by the general Sun Yu and given the name Sun Ruowei. The two daughters live out different lives: the younger is raised in the Imperial Palace as a maid and the older with a group of rebels loyal to the previous emperor. Ruowei gains literacy and martial arts skills, which prove helpful later.

Years later, Qingzheng Cult, in which Ruowei is raised, continues to plot to overthrow Yongle and re-establish Jianwen. During this time, Yongle's favorite grandson Zhu Zhanji is zealous in purging the remaining rebels; he meets Ruowei while doing so. Zhanji's attraction toward her grows, as her character and behavior differ from those of other palace ladies, such as Ruowei's penchant for speaking her mind.

During this time, her younger sister, Hu Shanxiang, rises through the ranks to a fairly high ranking attendant. She makes a deal with Zhanji's second uncle (Prince Han): he recommends her to be Zhanji's main wife; in exchange, Shanxiang will be his agent embedded in Zhanji's palace. Ruowei and Zhanji also marry, upon which she becomes the Imperial Concubine to the Imperial Grandson.

Afterward, Crown Prince Zhu Gaochi is left in Beijing to run the country while Yongle, his other sons, and grandson are go to war in the north. Already ill and needing help with the war correspondence with his father in the battlefield, Gaochi finds out that his new daughter-in-law, Ruowei, is literate and that her calligraphy is very similar to his. She becomes his personal scribe for the war effort and learns the ropes of running the country at war. As Gaochi's health deteriorates, she has to deliberate and give orders to the imperial counsels.

Over time, Ruowei's hatred for the Emperor and her quest for revenge dissipates as she weighs the costs of many other human lives to achieve revenge. After the untimely passing of Yongle, Gaochi who succeeds him as the Hongxi Emperor, and Zhanji who succeeds him as the Xuande Emperor; Ruowei finds herself in the middle of a power struggle between her son Emperor Yingzong of Ming and the Jingtai Emperor.

With her experience and ability, she guides her son through danger and helps him become a noble and virtuous ruler. In the end, Ruowei realizes that she cannot save the imperial family from the violence and bloodshed engendered by the struggle for the throne. She abdicates her position as Empress Dowager and leaves with her longtime true love, Xu Bin, on a treasure ship to explore the world together.

== Cast ==
=== Main ===
- Tang Wei as Sun Ruowei, Empress Sun – The daughter of an Imperial Physician killed during the reign of Yongle Emperor later adopted by Sun Zhong and renamed as Sun Ruowei. She is intelligent and brave; however, she is manipulated by the Qingzheng cult to seek revenge for her parents' death. She longs to be reunited with her younger sister, who was separated from her while they were running away. They reunite as members of Zhu Zhanji's harem: Ruowei as his concubine and her long-lost sister Hu Shanxiang, Zhanji's legitimate wife and upon his ascension, Empress. Ruowei tries to protect Shanxiang from Zhanji's suspicion and mistrust but fails when Zhanji discovers Shanxiang betrayed him in favor of Prince Han, who had sponsored her and Zhanji's marriage. Zhanji then deposes her and promotes Ruowei as his Empress. After his death, Ruowei is tasked with the regnancy of the kingdom while raising their son and dealing with rivals to power. She grows tired of the deaths and political machinations she witnessed, severs ties with her son, and leaves the kingdom to travel the world with her true love Xu Bin, fulfilling her wish from when she was a young woman.
- Deng Jiajia as Hu Shanxiang, Empress Gongrangzhang – Sun Ruowei's long lost sister. After their separation, she is adopted by Hu Shangyi and becomes a palace maid. Ambitious and obsessed with power, she becomes Zhu Zhanji's legitimate wife with the help of Prince Han.
- Zhu Yawen as Zhu Zhanji, Xuande Emperor, Hongxi Emperor's first son (Crown prince) – the son of Hongxi Emperor and Empress Zhang. He is ambitious, proud and aims to be like his grandfather. A favorite of the Yongle Emperor, he encounters Ruowei while investigating an attempt to assassinate the Emperor. He falls in love with Ruowei and promises her dying father to take care of her. However, he is forced to marry Hu Shanxiang, a candidate nominated by Prince Han, and takes Ruowei as his concubine. Through various political machinations, he ensures his father is the Emperor's successor and through that, his own ascension to the throne. After discovering the depth of his uncles' betrayal, Zhanji distances himself from all politics and grows immensely sick.

=== Supporting ===
==== Royal family ====
- Tan Xueliang as Zhu Yunwen, Jianwen Emperor
- Wang Xueqi as Zhu Di, Yongle Emperor
- Liang Guanhua as Zhu Gaochi, Hongxi Emperor – Yongle Emperor's first son (Crown Prince)
- Yu Haoming as Zhu Gaoxu, Prince of Han – Yongle Emperor's second son, a highly ambitious individual
- Luan Yuanhui as Zhu Gaosui, Prince of Zhao – Yongle Emperor's third son
- Wu Yue as Zhang Yan, Empress Zhang – wife of the Hongxi Emperor
- Long Ni as Consort Wei – Prince Han's consort
- Lay Zhang as Zhu Qizhen, Yingzong Emperor – Xuande Emperor's eldest son by Sun Ruowei. He becomes the Emperor at a young age with no governing experience. He is loved by his people through his determination to govern.
- Li Xinliang as Zhu Qiyu, Jingtai Emperor – Xuande Emperor's second son
- Hu Lingmeng as Empress Qian
- Chu Junchen as Sima Guang
- Zhao Yingzi as Noble Consort An – Zhu Di's concubine, the daughter of King Taejong of Joseon and Consort Piao's older sister. Although she holds a high position in the palace (Noble Consort (Chinese: 貴妃; pinyin: guìfēi)), she is not favoured and had no children.
- Sun Xiaoxiao as Consort Piao – Zhu Di's concubine. With the help of her older sister Noble Consort An, she is able to meet the Emperor.

==== Ministers ====
- Qiao Zhenyu as Xu Bin – The son of a deceased minister and an orphan at Jingnan. He has always loved Sun Ruowei and does everything he can to protect her.
- Gao Kaiyuan as Xie Jin
- Zhang Hao as Yang Shiqi
- Jiang Yang as Yang Rong
- Yang Weiqi as Yang Pu
- Zhou Yunshen as Jing Qing
- Su Ke as Yu Qian
- Guo Zhiting as Fan Zhong
- Tang Jianjun as Xu Youzhen
- Fu Lei as Shi Heng
- Dai Chaodong as Cao Bin
- Jianuo Guo as Chen Wenrong

==== Others ====
- Sun Yaoqi as Shuang Xi – a palace maid
- Shi Yueling as Hu Shangyi – Hu Shanxiang's adoptive mother. The highest-ranking palace maid, she is cruel and ruthless, very skilled, and well-versed in the way of the harem.
- Choenyi Tsering as Qi Muge – Princess of Wala. She fell in love with Zhu Qizhen, gave birth to his son Zhu Jianshen, and is killed by Zhu Qiyu.
- Wei Wei as Huangpu Yunhe
- Cao Minghua as Mahamud
- Zhu Jiayi as Jing Qing's wife
- Lobsang Namdak as Nie Xing
- Cui Tianyi as Xiao Douzi
- Li Haohan as Yao Guangxiao – Buddhist monk serving as adviser of Yongle Emperor and mentor of Xuande Emperor

== Production ==
Director Zhang Ting had written the script of many well-known dramas, including Four Generations Under One Roof. Zhang Li had produced many famous historical drama, including Towards the Republic, Ming Dynasty in 1566 and The Road We Have Taken. The crew also included creative director Zhao Hai, winner of both the Hong Kong Film Award and Golden Rooster Awards. Academy Award-nominated costume designer William Chang designed 140 costumes for Tang Wei's character in the series.

=== Casting ===
To immerse herself in the role, Tang Wei spent 8 months before shooting studying the history and culture of the Ming dynasty. About 400 extras auditioned for the drama, and the line-up for the main cast exceeded ten actors.

=== Filming ===
Principal photography began at Wuxi on 18 December 2017 and wrapped up on 29 July 2018.

== Original soundtrack ==
Ming Dynasty Original Soundtrack (OST)

Soundtrack album by Various artists
- Released: 25 December 2019
- Genres: Mandopop; Instrumental
- Language: Mandarin
- Label: Mai Tong Music
- Producer: Dong Yingda

The main composer of the Ming Dynasty OST is Dong Yingda, who also worked on The Great River (2018) and Like a Flowing River (2019). All versions of "One Heart" and "Life Guardian" were not included in the album and were released independently.

大明风华 电视剧原创音乐大碟 Original Soundtrack

No.	Title	Lyrics	Music	Singer	Length
1.	"Zhu Di's lamp (朱棣的灯)"		Dong Yingda		1:16
2.	"The Hidden Worries of War (战争的隐忧)"		Dong Yingda		1:08
3.	"If I refer to that person (如朕指亲临牌)"		Dong Yingda		1:04
4.	"Exotic warfare (异域战争)"		Dong Yingda		1:24
5.	"Ancient Love Song (上古情歌)"	Dong Yingda	Dong Yingda	Qi Yu	1:02
6.	"Do you want Military Power? (你要兵权？)"		Dong Yingda		1:02
7.	"Unwillingness (其木格不舍)"		Dong Yingda		1:24
8.	"Good Two Brothers (哥俩好)"		Dong Yingda		1:14
9.	"For Food (对食儿)"		Dong Yingda		1:18
10.	"Disturbing at the Time (当时已惘然)"	Dong Yingda	Dong Yingda	Wang Xiaomin	2:00
11.	"Emotional Fluctuation (情感波动)"		Dong Yingda		1:06
12.	"New Emperor (新皇)"		Dong Yingda		2:02
13.	"Pu Fei's Palace (朴妃宫廷)"		Dong Yingda		0:52
14.	"White Cloud Dog (白云苍狗)"	Dong Yingda, Zhang Ting	Dong Yingda	Xu Hebin	1:56
15.	"Nie Xing Ruowei (聂兴若微)"		Dong Yingda		1:28
16.	"Relaxed (轻松)"		Dong Yingda		1:02
17.	"Easy – pipa version (轻松 – 琵琶版)"		Dong Yingda		1:04
18.	"One Heart – Theme song (一次心 (主题曲))"	Nan Jiu'er	Liu Fengyao	Henry Huo, Mi Liang	4:46
19.	"One Heart – Theme song (一次心 (主题曲))"	Nan Jiu'er	Liu Fengyao	Henry Huo	4:49
20.	"Lifetime Guardian – Interlude (生世守护（插曲）米靓)"	Liu Fengyao	Liu Fengyao	Shuang Sheng	3:08
21.	"Lifetime Guardian – Interlude (生世守护（插曲）双笙)"	Liu Fengyao	Liu Fengyao	Mi Liang	3:05

== Reception ==
=== Audience viewership ===
- Highest ratings are marked in red, lowest ratings are marked in blue

Hunan TV CSM59 City ratings
Broadcast date	Ratings (%)	Audience share (%)	Rank
2019.12.17	1.918	7.23	1
2019.12.18	1.918	7.36	1
2019.12.19	1.892	7.08	1
2019.12.20	1.854	6.15	1
2019.12.21	1.718	5.79	1
2019.12.22	1.993	7.09	1
2019.12.23	1.949	7.51	1
2019.12.24	1.909	7.26	1
2019.12.25	1.975	7.36	1
2019.12.26	2.044	7.73	1
2019.12.27	1.549	5.37	2
2019.12.28	1.504	4.99	2
2019.12.29	1.906	6.91	1
2019.12.30	2.078	7.72	1
2020.1.1	2.111	7.56	1
2020.1.2	1.913	7	1
2020.1.3	1.672	5.65	1
2020.1.4	1.69	5.48	2
2020.1.5	2.048	7.13	1
2020.1.6	2.288	8.32	2
2020.1.7	2.191	7.83	1
2020.1.8	2.266	8.15	1
2020.1.9	2.28	8.06	1
2020.1.10	2.095	7.12	1
2020.1.11	1.714	5.59	1
2020.1.12	2.256	7.77	1
2020.1.13	2.136	7.69	1
2020.1.14	2.034	7.26	1
2020.1.15	2.01	7.06	1
2020.1.16	2.012	7.11	1
2020.1.17	1.959	6.88	1
2020.1.19	1.033	3.56	5
2020.1.20	1.951	6.97	1
2020.1.21	1.951	7.05	1
2020.1.22	1.926	6.7	1
2020.1.23	1.911	6.11	1
Average ratings	1.935	6.88	/

Hunan TV CSM National Network ratings
Broadcast date	Ratings (%)	Audience share (%)	Rank (including CCTV)	Rank (excluding CCTV)
2019.12.17	0.75	3.4	2	1
2019.12.18	0.82	3.75	2	1
2019.12.19	0.81	3.64	2	1
2019.12.20	0.92	3.3	2	1
2019.12.21	0.82	2.94	3	1
2019.12.22	0.81	3.45	3	1
2019.12.23	0.77	3.55	2	1
2019.12.24	0.76	3.39	4	1
2019.12.25	0.80	3.50	3	1
2019.12.26	0.5	3.54	3	1
2019.12.27	0.60	2.18	4	2
2019.12.28	0.66	2.36	3	1
2019.12.29	0.90	3.88	3	1
2019.12.30	0.85	3.76	3	1
2020.1.1	0.96	4.19	2	1
2020.1.2	Not available			
2020.1.3	0.64	2.37	3	1
2020.1.4	0.64	2.33	4	2
2020.1.5	0.85	3.53	2	1
2020.1.6	0.97	4.17	2	1
2020.1.7	0.93	2.89	2	1
2020.1.8	1.02	4.25	2	1
2020.1.9	0.96	3.98	2	1
2020.1.10	1.13	4.3	2	1
2020.1.11	0.77	2.78	3	1
2020.1.12	1.16	4.56	2	1
2020.1.13	1.19	4.98	2	1
2020.1.14	1.08	4.38	2	1
2020.1.15	1.03	4.08	2	1
2020.1.16	1.11	4.5	3	1
2020.1.17	1.16	4.65	1	1
2020.1.19	0.70	2.70	4	2
2020.1.20	1.06	4.27	2	1
2020.1.21	1.06	4.38	2	1
2020.1.22	1.16	4.64	2	1
2020.1.23	1.08	3.86	2	1
Average ratings	0.89	3.67	/	/

=== Accolades ===
Award	Category	Nominee	Result	Ref.
26th Shanghai Television Festival	Best Supporting Actress	Deng Jiajia	Nominated	
30th China TV Golden Eagle Award	Outstanding Television Series	Ming Dynasty	Nominated	
30th China TV Golden Eagle Award	Audience's Choice for Actor	Zhang Yixing	Nominated	
30th China TV Golden Eagle Award	Best Cinematography	Yang Jun	Nominated	
