= Guo Ai =

Chinese concubine (died 1428)

Guo Ai 郭愛
- Concubine Guo
- Born: Fengyang
- Died: 1428; Xuande 3 (宣德三年)
- Spouse: Xuande Emperor
Names
- Guo Ai (郭愛)
Posthumous name
- Zhen'ai (貞哀)
- Clan: Guo (郭)

Concubine Guo (simplified Chinese: 国嫔; traditional Chinese: 國嬪; pinyin: Guó Pín; died 1428), personal name Guo Ai (Chinese: 郭愛; pinyin: Guō Ài), courtesy name Shanli (善理), was a concubine of Xuande Emperor.

== Biography ==
Concubine Guo was born as Guo Ai in Fengyang in present day Anhui province. She was selected into the palace because she was intelligent and quick witted, and excelled at poetry and prose. She died of illness soon after she was selected into the palace.

== Poetry ==
Well versed in poetry, Gao composed a poem in the ancient rhapsody (fu) style, for her previous life didn't seem to be happy, and probably due to illness. Later critics commented that this poem lamenting her fate was in the style of Cai Yan, a Chinese composer, poet, and writer who lived during the late Eastern Han dynasty of China. The way she expressed her feeling was neither overblown nor undignified. The poem appears in different anthologies with slight textual variations. The variant titles are version of "Feeling Sorry for Myself When Seriously Ill in My Residence in the Capital" (jingdi bingji zi'ai/Bingley zi'ai/zi'ai).

== Sources ==
- Lee, Lily Xiao Hong; Wiles, Sue (13 March 2014). Biographical Dictionary of Chinese Women: Tang Through Ming, 618-1644. M.E. Sharpe. ISBN 978-0-7656-4316-2.
- Lee, Lily Xiao Hong; Wiles, Sue (28 January 2015). Biographical Dictionary of Chinese Women, Volume II: Tang Through Ming 618 - 1644. Routledge. ISBN 978-1-317-51562-3.
