= Empress Sun =

Empress of China from 1428 to 1435

Empress Xiaogongzhang 孝恭章皇后
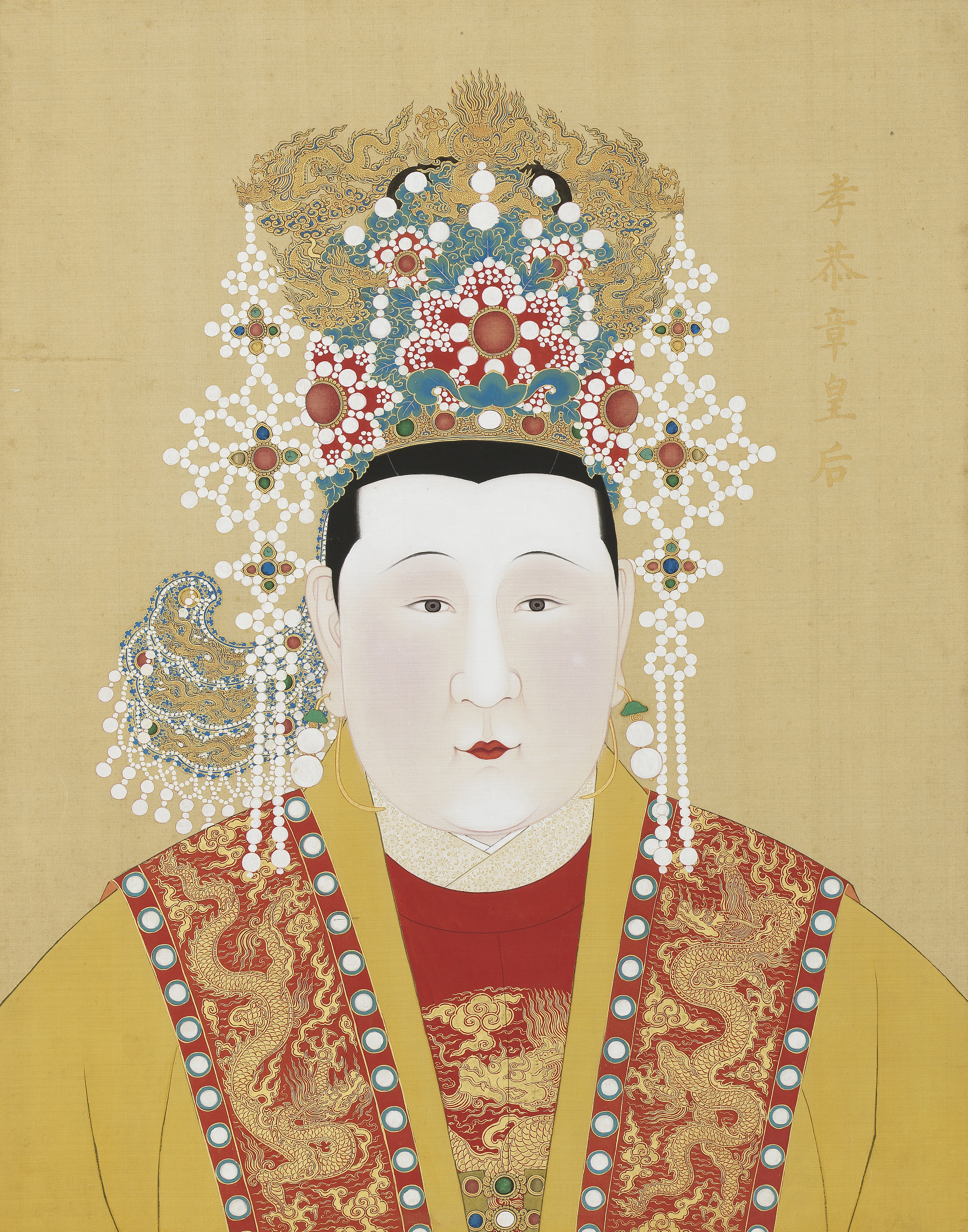

Empress dowager of the Ming dynasty
- Tenure: 7 February 1435 – 26 September 1462
- Predecessor: Empress Dowager Zhang; Empress Dowager Xiaoyi
- Successor: Empress Dowager Xiaoyi; Empress Dowager Ciyi; Empress Dowager Zhou

Empress consort of the Ming dynasty
- Tenure: 1428–1435
- Predecessor: Empress Gongrangzhang
- Successor: Empress Xiaozhuangrui
- Born: c. 1399; Zouping County, Shandong
- Died: 26 September 1462 (aged 62–63)
- Burial: 23 November 1462; Jing Mausoleum
- Spouse: Xuande Emperor (m. 1417; died 1435)
- Issue: Emperor Yingzong; Princess Changde
Posthumous name
- Empress Xiaogong Yixian Ciren Zhuanglie Qitian Peisheng Zhang (孝恭懿憲慈仁莊烈齊天配聖章皇后)
- Clan: Sun (孫)
- Father: Sun Zhong (孫忠)
- Mother: Dong Yuanzhen (董元貞)

Empress Xiaogongzhang (孝恭章皇后; c. 1399 – 26 September 1462), of the Sun clan, was a Chinese empress consort of the Ming dynasty, married to the fifth Ming emperor, the Xuande Emperor. She was mother of Zhu Qizhen, Emperor Yingzong.

== Early life ==
Empress Sun was born in 1399 in Zouping, Shandong Province. Her personal name is unknown. Her father was Sun Zhong, an assistant magistrate in Yongcheng District. She had five brothers, the eldest of whom was Sun Qizong (1395 – 1480). He and his three brothers held the rank of guard commander, and another brother held the rank of assistant commander in the Embroidered Uniform Guard.

Sun was known to be a local beauty. When Crown Princess Zhang (the future Empress Zhang, who also grew up in the Yongcheng District) visited her hometown, she heard about Sun's beauty. Curious about the young girl's beauty, the crown princess brought her to the palace. Here she received praise from the palace women.

The Yongle Emperor ordered his wife, Empress Xu, to care for and educate the young girl. In 1417, Sun was selected to be a concubine to Zhu Zhanji (future Xuande Emperor), who was the imperial grandson. In 1424, she gave birth to a daughter, the Princess Changde. When Zhu Zhanji ascended the throne in 1425, she became Noble Consort Sun (Chinese: 孫貴妃; pinyin: Sūn guìfēi), which was the second-highest position after the empress.

== Empress ==
In 1427, she gave birth to a son. As Empress Hu had not given birth to a son, the son of Sun was made crown prince. In 1428, the emperor proposed to depose Empress Hu and install Sun as the new empress. At first, Sun refused and said that Empress Hu would eventually have a son that would take precedence over her own son. However, the emperor insisted and finally, Sun agreed. Empress Hu was deposed, and Sun herself, the mother of the crown prince, was promoted to the position of empress (Chinese: 孫皇后; pinyin: Sūn húanghòu).

The investiture of Empress Sun took place in a grand ceremony. Once her formal announcement was made, the palace held congratulatory banquets, one for the emperor and the other for the empress.

After Sun was invested, she held court in her residence and regularly met with eunuchs and female officials. Her official duties included personnel evaluation, approving budgets, and planning royal marriages. The emperor's consorts and imperial princesses would make regular visits to her. She reported daily to her mother-in-law, Empress Dowager Zhang on family affairs. She also performed the rites at the ancestral altar. On special occasions, she would dine with the emperor at his residence.

== Empress dowager ==
After Xuande's unexpected death in 1435, their son Yingzong ascended the throne, and Sun became the empress dowager (Chinese: 孫皇太后; pinyin: Sūn huáng tàihòu). A day before he died, Xuande issued instructions that the civil and military officials should guide the child, and they should petition his mother, Empress Dowager Zhang and Sun on all important matters of the family and state. She and her mother-in-law openly vied for supremacy. Ultimately Zhang prevailed and sidelined Sun. Sun tried to influence certain government matters, and the imperial historians censured her, a custom acted to restrain palace women.

After Zhang's death in 1442, Yingzong began to manage the matters himself. In 1449, he decided to lead a military expedition against the Mongols, and was promptly captured. Sun and his consort Empress Qian immediately raised a ransom in jewels, and sent it off to secure his release. At first it was decided that the court should retreat to the south. However, Li Yongchang won over the empress, and Yu Qian's party won the day, according to whom that those who advocated retreat should be executed.

The officials despised Yingzong, and decided to make his younger brother Jingtai Emperor. He was first instructed by Sun to take charge of government affairs as regent, while the emperor's one-year-old son was made heir apparent. On 15 September 1449, with Sun's assent, he was urged to ascend the throne in person, since the emperor was in captivity and his one-year-old son was incapable of ruling. He at first refused, since it would confuse the dynastic succession. Only after Sun's approval and Yu Qian's advocacy of the urgent national need for leadership eventually persuaded him. On 23 September, only three weeks after the emperor's capture he ascended the throne, and the captive emperor was given the title of retired emperor. Sun was given the title of high and sacred empress dowager (Chinese: 上聖皇太后; pinyin: Shàng shèng huáng tàihòu).

The Mongols soon released Yingzong, knowing that the presence of two emperors would cause instability among their enemies. He was initially placed under house arrest. Six years later in 1457, Sun and her brothers lead a coup that dethroned Jingtai, and placed Yingzong back on the throne. She was given the title of Empress Dowager Shengliecishou (Chinese: 圣烈慈寿皇太后).

== Death ==
Empress Sun died of illness on 26 September 1462, and was given the posthumous title Empress Xiaogong Yixian Ciren Zhuanglie Qitian Peisheng Zhang (孝恭懿憲慈仁莊烈齊天配聖章皇后). She was buried on 23 November 1462 in the Jingling Mausoleum.

== Issue ==
- As concubine of the Imperial Grandson-heir:
  - Princess Changde (常德公主; 1424–1470), the Xuande Emperor's third daughter
- As Noble Consort Sun:
  - Zhu Qizhen, Emperor Yingzong (英宗 朱祁鎮; 29 November 1427 – 23 February 1464), the Xuande Emperor's first son

== Titles ==
- During the reign of the Jianwen Emperor (r. 1398–1402):
  - Lady Sun (孫氏; from 1399)
- During the reign of the Yongle Emperor (r. 1402–1424):
  - Concubine of the Imperial Grandson-heir (皇太孫嬪; from 1417)
- During the reign of the Xuande Emperor (r. 1425–1435):
  - Noble Consort Sun (孫貴妃; from 1425)
  - Empress (皇后; from 1428)
- During the reign of the Zhengtong Emperor (r. 1435–1449):
  - Empress dowager (皇太后; from 7 February 1435)
- During the reign of the Jingtai Emperor (r. 1449–1457):
  - Empress Dowager Shangsheng (上聖皇太后; from 1449)
- During the reign of the Tianshun Emperor (r. 1457–1464):
  - Empress Dowager Shengliecishou (聖烈慈壽皇太后; from 1457)
  - Empress Xiaogong Yixian Ciren Zhuanglie Qitian Peisheng Zhang (孝恭懿憲慈仁莊烈齊天配聖章皇后; from 1462)

== In popular culture ==
- Portrayed by Tang Wei as the main character in the 2019 Chinese TV series Ming Dynasty.
- Portrayed by Wu Jinyan as the main character in the 2022 Chinese TV series Royal Feast.

== Sources ==
- McMahon, Keith (2016). Celestial Women: Imperial Wives and Concubines in China from Song to Qing. Rowman & Littlefield Publishers. ISBN 978-1-442-25502-9.
- Hinsch, Bret (28 April 2021). Women in Ming China. Rowman & Littlefield. ISBN 978-1-5381-5297-3.
- Twitchett, Denis Crispin; Fairbank, John King (1978). The Cambridge History of China. Cambridge University Press. ISBN 978-0-521-24332-2.
- Lee, Lily Xiao Hong; Wiles, Sue (13 March 2014). Biographical Dictionary of Chinese Women: Tang Through Ming, 618-1644. M.E. Sharpe. ISBN 978-0-7656-4316-2.
- Lee, Lily Xiao Hong; Wiles, Sue (28 January 2015). Biographical Dictionary of Chinese Women, Volume II: Tang Through Ming 618 - 1644. Routledge. ISBN 978-1-317-51562-3.
- Heer, Ph. De (1986). The Care-taker Emperor: Aspects of the Imperial Institution in Fifteenth-century China as Reflected in the Political History of the Reign of Chu Chʾi-yü. BRILL. ISBN 90-04-07898-3.

Chinese royalty
Preceded by Empress Gongrangzhang	Empress consort of China; 1428–1435	Succeeded by Empress Xiaozhuangrui
