= Chuiwan =

Ancient Chinese game resembling golf

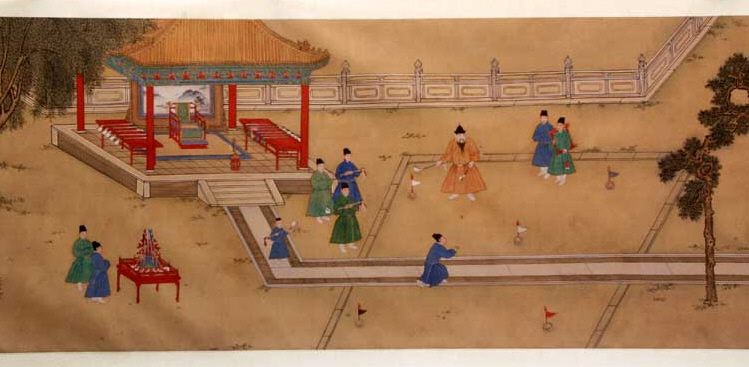
A court painting depicting Xuande Emperor of the Ming dynasty playing chuiwan. Coloured flags can be seen in the holes.

Chuiwan (Chinese: 捶丸; pinyin: chuíwán; lit. 'ball-hitting') was a game in ancient China. Its rules resemble modern golf.

The book Dongxuan lu (東軒錄), written by Wei Tai (魏泰; fl. 1050–1100) of the Song dynasty, describes how a southern Tang official teaches his daughter how to dig goals in the ground and drive a ball into them. The game became popular by the Song dynasty; and a work called Wan jing (丸經, lit. 'ball-treatise') of the Yuan dynasty was specially devoted to it. The latest documents about chuiwan in China are from the two paintings of the Ming dynasty from the 15th century. There is a color image of the mural painting still preserved on the wall of a Water God Temple in Hongdong, Shanxi. Ling Honglin, a Chinese professor at Lanzhou University, suggested the game was exported to Europe and then Scotland by Mongol travellers in the late Middle Ages.

The rules for chuiwan are remarkably similar to that of modern golf, in that players use restricted number of clubs (up to 10 in chuiwan, 14 in golf), holes are spread on terrains of varying difficulty, and marked by colored flags; and there is also strict etiquette and rules with regard to player honesty, with penalties for cheating. Chuiwan balls are of different sizes and made of wood. The tee-off areas are called ji (基; lit. 'base').

The popularity of chuiwan peaked in the Song dynasty, during which time Emperor Huizong is reported to have been a dedicated player, and it remained a favorite sport during the Yuan and Ming dynasties. In the Qing dynasty the game of Chuiwan steadily declined, and it eventually became a casual game for women and children.
