= Consort Wu (Xuande) =

Chinese empress dowager (1397–1462)

Empress Dowager Xiaoyi 孝翼皇太后

Empress dowager of the Ming dynasty
- Tenure: 22 September 1449 – 24 February 1457
- Predecessor: Empress Dowager Sun
- Successor: Empress Dowager Shenglie
- Born: 1397; Dantu, Zhenjiang Prefecture (present-day Dantu District, Zhenjiang, Jiangsu Province)
- Died: 16 January 1462 (age 65)
- Spouse: Xuande Emperor
- Issue: Jingtai Emperor
Posthumous name
- Empress Dowager Xiàoyì Chénhuì Shūshèn Círén Kuāngtiān Xīshèng (孝翼溫惠淑慎慈仁匡天錫聖皇太后)
- Clan: Wu (吳)
- Father: Wu Yanming (吳彥名)
- Mother: Lady Shen (神氏)

Empress Dowager Xiaoyi (Chinese: 孝翼皇太后; 1397 – 16 January 1462), of the Wu clan, was a concubine of the Xuande Emperor.

== Biography ==
Records say she comes from the Wu clan from Zhejiang Province. Her family consisted of her father Wu Yanming, her mother Lady Shen, her four brothers Wu Xing, Wu Zhong, Wu Rong and Wu An and three sisters: Wu Miaoxiang, Wu Miaoyin and Wu Miaoqing.

She entered court on the 10th year of Yongle (1412) when she was sixteen years old. At this time Zhu Zhanji was the emperor's grandson, and she was assigned as his servant in Yuqing Palace. After this, the next record of her is when she gave birth to Zhu Qiyu in 1428 and was instated as Consort Xian that same year. It is rumored however that Zhu Qiyu is not the Xuande Emperor's child.

After the death of the Xuande Emperor, his eldest son by his wife Empress Sun was enthroned as the Zhengtong Emperor. In 1449, the Zhengtong Emperor became a prisoner of the Oirat Mongols and because of this, Zhu Qiyu was enthroned as the Jingtai Emperor. He honored his mother as empress dowager. But after the deposition of the Jingtai Emperor, in 1457, the Zhengtong Emperor demoted Empress Dowager Wu and gave her the title of Consort Xuanmiaoxian (宣廟賢妃). When she died she was given the posthumous title of Consort Rongsixian (榮思賢妃).

After the enthronement of the Hongguang Emperor, she was elevated to the rank of empress dowager and was given the posthumous title Empress Dowager Xiàoyì Chénhuì Shūshèn Círén Kuāngtiān Xīshèng (孝翼溫惠淑慎慈仁匡天錫聖皇太后).

== Titles ==
- During the reign of the Hongwu Emperor (r. 1368–1398):
  - Lady Wu (吳氏; from 1397)
- During the reign of the Yongle Emperor (r. 1402–1424)
  - Palace Lady (from 1412)
- During the reign of the Xuande Emperor (r. 1425–1435):
  - Consort Xian (賢妃; from September 1428)
- During the reign of the Jingtai Emperor (r. 1435 – 1457):
  - Empress Dowager (皇太后; from 22 September 1449)
- During the reign of the Tianshun Emperor (r. 1457–1464)
  - Consort Xuanmiaoxian (宣廟賢妃; from 1457)
  - Consort Rongsixian (榮思賢妃; from 1462)
- During the reign of Hongguang Emperor (r. 1644–1645)
  - Empress Dowager Xiàoyì Chénhuì Shūshèn Círén Kuāngtiān Xīshèng (孝翼溫惠淑慎慈仁匡天錫聖皇太后; from 1644)

== Issue ==
- As Palace Lady:
  - Zhu Qiyu, the Jingtai Emperor (景泰帝 朱祁鈺; 21 September 1428 – 14 March 1457), the Xuande Emperor's second son

== Notes ==
1. 明史/卷300 列傳第一百八十八 外戚
2. ^ 參照《万历野获编》
