= Empress Zhang (Hongxi) =

Empress of China from 1424 to 1425

Empress Chengxiaozhao 誠孝昭皇后
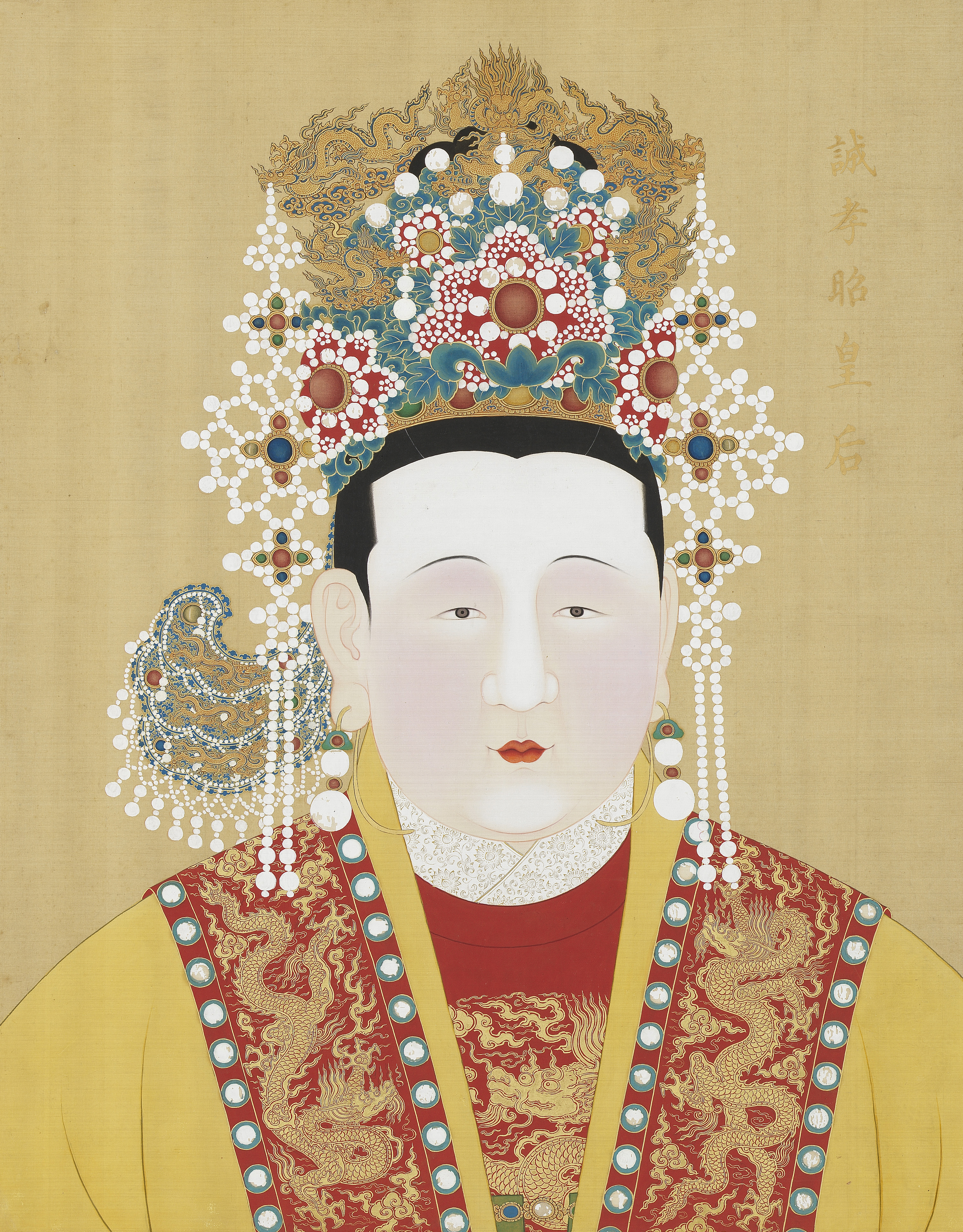

Grand empress dowager of the Ming dynasty
- Tenure: 7 February 1435 – 20 November 1442
- Successor: Grand Empress Dowager Zhou

Empress dowager of the Ming dynasty
- Tenure: 27 June 1425 – 31 January 1435
- Successor: Empress Dowager Sun

Empress consort of the Ming dynasty
- Tenure: 29 October 1424 – 29 May 1425
- Predecessor: Empress Renxiaowen
- Successor: Empress Gongrangzhang
- Born: 1379; Yongcheng, Henan
- Died: 20 November 1442 (aged 62–63)
- Burial: Xian Mausoleum
- Spouse: Hongxi Emperor (m. 1395; died 1425)
- Issue: Xuande Emperor; Zhu Zhanyong, Prince Jing of Yue; Zhu Zhanshan, Prince Xian of Xiang; Princess Jiaxing
Posthumous name
- Empress Chéngxiào Gōngsù Míngdé Hóngrén Shùntiān Zhāoshèng Zhāo (誠孝恭肅明德弘仁順天昭聖昭皇后)
- Clan: Zhang (張)
- Father: Zhang Qi, Marquis of Pengcheng (彭城侯 張麒)
- Mother: Lady Tong (仝氏)

Empress Chengxiaozhao (誠孝昭皇后; 1379 – 20 November 1442), of the Zhang clan, was a Chinese empress consort of the Ming dynasty, married to the fourth Ming ruler, the Hongxi Emperor (Zhu Gaochi 1378–1425). He only ruled for one year, so she then served as Empress dowager after the accession of her son the Xuande Emperor. She later served as the Regent of China during the minority of the reign of her grandson, Emperor Yingzong of Ming, from 1435 until 1442.

== Early life ==
Zhang was from Northern Shanxi, a peasant background, the daughter of Zhang Qi (張麒) and Lady Tong (仝氏). She had two brothers, Zang Chang (1374–1428), who was a distinguished General, and Zang Sheng (1379–1444), who rose to the rank of commander-in-chief (dudu tongzhi). Both brothers were enfeoffed as earls.

She became the first spouse of the future Hongxi Emperor in 1395 or 1396. On her marriage, her father was posthumously enfeoffed as Marquis of Pengcheng (彭城侯). She gave birth to her eldest son, Zhu Zhanji in 1399. He became the favourite of his grandfather, who appointed him imperial grandson-heir (Huang Taisun) in 1411. In 1405, she gave birth to her second son, Zhu Zhanyong, followed by Zhu Zhanshan in 1406, and a daughter, Princess Jiaxing in 1409.

In 1404, her spouse was made heir apparent and Zhang was elevated to crown princess (Chinese: 皇太子妃; pinyin: Huáng Tàizǐfēi). His father, however, was not convinced that he was the right choice for heir apparent, and tried several attempts to appoint someone else. Court officials resisted these attempts. Zhang, a respectful and filial as well as a good manager played a part in his retaining the position as the heir apparent.

== Empress ==
On 7 September 1424, her spouse ascended the throne as the Hongxi Emperor, and on 29 October, she was made empress (Chinese: 張皇后; pinyin: Zhāng Húanghòu). She was described as wise, good and capable, with a great knowledge of all events both inside and outside of the palace, and was held in good confidence of the emperor, who allowed her to participate in state affairs.

In 1425, her son succeeded to the throne as the Xuande Emperor. He granted his mother the title of Empress dowager (Chinese: 張皇太后; pinyin: Zhāng Húang tàihòu). She was a dominant presence during the reign of her son, and accompanied him on his trips around the empire.

== Regency ==
In 1435, Zhang's son was succeeded by her eight-year-old grandson, Emperor Yingzong of Ming, and she was granted the title Grand empress dowager (Chinese: 太皇太后; pinyin: Tàihuáng tàihòu). There was no precedent on how to handle the occurrence of a child emperor in the Ming dynasty. The emperor had instructed his ministers to guide his son and take advice from Zhang. To prevent any succession dispute, Zhang appeared before the ministers and presented her grandson as the new emperor.

A regency was formed consisting of Zhang Fu (Duke of Yingguo), as well as three grand secretaries: Yang Shiqi, Yang Rong and Yang Pu, with Empress Zhang as the head of the regency council and regent. It was she who appointed the five ministers of the minor government. She was never formally given the title of regent: when she was asked to, she responded that there was no ancestral precedence for such a thing in the dynasty. Though she refused the title, she still acted as regent, and held council with her ministers, listened to their views, and reserved the final say to her.

Well known was her conflict with the child emperor's influential favorite, Wang Zhen, a eunuch, whom she regarded as too influential and in danger of becoming one of the infamous de facto ruler-eunuchs of the past. She summoned the ministers and a group of female officials, armed them, called upon Wang Zhen and sentenced him to death on the spot, and ordered the ministers and female officials to kill him immediately. When the emperor and ministers begged her to pardon Wang Zhen, she did so and warned the latter not to err again.

She kept her position as regent of China until her death in 1442. She was called a "Yao and Shun among women".

== Titles ==
- During the reign of the Hongwu Emperor (r. 1368–1398):
  - Lady Zhang (張氏; from 1379)
  - Hereditary Princess of Yan (燕世子妃; from 1395/1396)
- During the reign of the Yongle Emperor (r. 1402–1424):
  - Crown Princess (皇太子妃; from 1404)
- During the reign of the Hongxi Emperor (r. 1424–1425):
  - Empress (皇后; from 29 October 1424)
- During the reign of the Xuande Emperor (r. 1425–1435):
  - Empress dowager (皇太后; from 27 June 1425)
- During the reign of the Zhengtong Emperor (r. 1435–1449)
  - Grand empress dowager (太皇太后; from 7 February 1435)
  - Empress Chéngxiào Gōngsù Míngdé Hóngrén Shùntiān Zhāoshèng Zhāo (誠孝恭肅明德弘仁順天昭聖昭皇后; from 1442)

== Issue ==
- As Hereditary Princess:
  - Zhu Zhanji, the Xuande Emperor (宣宗 朱瞻基; 16 March 1399 – 31 January 1435), the Hongxi Emperor's first son
- As Crown Princess:
  - Zhu Zhanyong, Prince Jing of Yue (越靖王 朱瞻墉; 9 February 1405 – 5 August 1439), the Hongxi Emperor's third son
  - Zhu Zhanshan, Prince Xian of Xiang (襄憲王 朱瞻墡; 4 April 1406 – 18 February 1478), the Hongxi Emperor's fifth son
  - Princess Jiaxing (嘉興公主; 1409 – 9 March 1439), the Hongxi Emperor's first daughter

== Popular culture ==
Empress Zhang was played by Wu Yue in the 2019 series Ming Dynasty.
Portrayed by Liu Min in the 2022 Chinese television series Royal Feast.

== Sources ==
- Lin, Yanqing (2014). "Zhang, Empress of the Hongxi Emperor, Renzong, of Ming". In Lee, Lily Xiao Hong; Wiles, Sue (eds.). Biographical Dictionary of Chinese Women, Volume II: Tang Through Ming 618 - 1644. New York: M. E. Sharpe. pp. 580–581. ISBN 9780765643162.
- Zhang, Tingyu, ed. (1739). 《明史》列传第一 后妃 [History of Ming, Historical Biography 1, Wives and Consorts]. Ctext (in Chinese).
- McMahon, Keith (2016). Celestial Women: Imperial Wives and Concubines in China from Song to Qing. Rowman & Littlefield Publishers. ISBN 9781442255029.

Chinese royalty
Preceded by Empress Renxiaowen	Empress consort of China; 1424–1425	Succeeded by Empress Gongrangzhang
