= Empress Hu (Xuande) =

Empress of China from 1425 to 1428

Empress Gongrangzhang 恭讓章皇后

Empress consort of the Ming dynasty
- Tenure: 27 June 1425 – 1428
- Predecessor: Empress Chengxiaozhao
- Successor: Empress Xiaogongzhang
- Born: 20 May 1402; Jining, Shandong
- Died: 5 December 1443 (aged 41)
- Burial: Jinshan, Beijing
- Spouse: Xuande Emperor (m. 1417; died 1435)
- Issue: Princess Shunde; Princess Yongqing
Names
- Hu Shanxiang (胡善祥)
Posthumous name
- Empress Gōngràng Chéngshùn Kāngmù Jìngcí Zhāng (恭讓誠順康穆静慈章皇后)
- Clan: Hu (胡)
- Father: Hu Rong (胡榮)
- Mother: Lady Liu (劉氏)

Empress Hu (Chinese: 胡皇后; pinyin: Hú húanghòu; 20 May 1402 – 5 December 1443), personal name Hu Shanxiang, was a Chinese empress consort of the Ming dynasty, married to the Xuande Emperor. She was posthumously honoured with the title Empress Gongrangzhang.

== Early life ==
Empress Hu was born c. 1400 in Jining in present day Shandong Province. Her given name was Hu Shanxiang. Her father, Hu Rong, was a company commander (Chinese: 百戶; pinyin: baihu). In 1417, she married Zhu Zhanji, the eldest son of the Crown Prince, and became his primary consort. Three years later in 1420, they had a daughter, the Princess Shunde. When Zhu Zhanji's father, the Hongxi Emperor ascended the throne in 1424, Empress Hu was appointed Crown Princess (Chinese: 皇太子妃; pinyin: huángtàizǐ fēi).

== Empress ==
Upon the accession of Zhu Zhanji to the throne as the Xuande Emperor in 1425, she became his empress (Chinese: 胡皇后; pinyin: Hú húanghòu). Empress Hu was described as weak and sickly. The emperor disilked her for not having a son, and when she at one occasion advised him not to indulge in his love of travel, he resented her for intervening in his affairs.

Xuande preferred the beautiful and intelligent Noble Consort Sun, and when she gave birth to a son in 1427, he named this son as the Crown Prince. Xuande eagerly worked to further promote the status of Noble Consort Sun. Consequently, five Grand Secretaries were ordered to prepare a legal method that would enable the emperor to depose Empress Hu. Grand Secretary Yang Shiqi argued that deposing the empress without good reason would damage his reputation. However, Yang was unable to convice the emperor and avert her dismissal on the grounds that she has no son, is frequently ill, and is sterile. He then suggested that instead of deposing her, Xuande should told the Empress to respectfully resign, and that afterward she should be treated well for the rest of her life.

And so in the spring of 1428, Empress Hu resigned her position in favour of the mother of the crown prince, Noble Consort Sun. She was sent to Chang'an Palace and given the title of Immortal Teacher of Quietude and Maternal Compassion (Chinese: 静慈仙师; pinyin: Jìng cí xiān shī), a title previously given to deposed empresses who were forced to become nuns, although this religious element was not demanded of Hu.

== Later life and death ==
Empress Hu was regarded with sympathy and her mother-in-law, the empress dowager, who demonstrated her sympathy and friendship by often inviting the former empress to stay with her in the Qingning Palace and giving her the seat of the empress at banquets in the inner palace even when Empress Sun was present. When the empress dowager died in 1442, Hu lost an important ally at court.

After the death of her mother-in-law, Hu was ranked a consort (Chinese: 妃; pinyin: fēi), and no longer enjoyed an equal status with Empress Sun. She died of illness in 1443 and was buried in Jinshan according to rites prescribed for a concubine.

When Empress Dowager Sun died in 1462, Empress Qian, consort of Emperor Yingzong (Empress Sun's son), urged him to restore Hu's status as empress. Accordingly, in the summer of 1463, her title as empress was restored, a mausoleum was constructed for her according to the rites prescribed for an empress, and she was given the posthumous title Empress Gongrang Chengshun Kangmu Jingci Zhang (Chinese: 恭讓誠順康穆静慈章皇后).

== Titles ==
- During the reign of the Jianwen Emperor (r. 1398–1402):
  - Lady Hu (胡氏; from 20 May 1402)
- During the reign of the Yongle Emperor (r. 1402–1424):
  - Consort of the Imperial Grandson-heir (皇太孫嬪; from 1417)
- During the reign of the Hongxi Emperor (r. 1424–1425)
  - Crown Princess (皇太子妃; from 1424)
- During the reign of the Xuande Emperor (r. 1425–1435):
  - Empress (皇后; from 27 June 1425)
  - Jingci Xianshi (靜慈仙師; from 1428)
- During the reign of the Tianshun Emperor (r. 1457–1464):
  - Empress Gongrang Chengshun Kangmu Jingci Zhang (恭讓誠順康穆静慈章皇后; from the summer of 1463)

== Issue ==
- As consort of the Imperial Grandson-heir:
  - Princess Shunde (順德公主; 1420–1443), the Xuande Emperor's first daughter
  - Princess Yongqing (永清公主; d. 1433), the Xuande Emperor's second daughter

== In popular culture ==
- Portrayed by Deng Jiajia in the 2019 Chinese television series Ming Dynasty.
- Portrayed by Zhang Nan in the 2022 Chinese television series Royal Feast.

== Sources ==
- Lee, Lily Xiao Hong; Wiles, Sue (13 March 2014). Biographical Dictionary of Chinese Women: Tang Through Ming, 618-1644. M.E. Sharpe. ISBN 978-0-7656-4316-2.
- Lee, Lily Xiao Hong; Wiles, Sue (28 January 2015). Biographical Dictionary of Chinese Women, Volume II: Tang Through Ming 618 - 1644. Routledge. ISBN 978-1-317-51562-3.

Chinese royalty
Preceded by Empress Chengxiaozhao	Empress consort of China; 1425–1428	Succeeded by Empress Xiaogongzhang
