= Xuande Emperor =

Emperor of China from 1425 to 1435

Xuande Emperor 宣德帝
- Palace portrait on a hanging scroll

Emperor of the Ming dynasty
- Reign: 29 May 1425 – 31 January 1435
- Enthronement: 27 June 1425
- Predecessor: Hongxi Emperor
- Successor: Emperor Yingzong
- Born: 16 March 1399; Beijing, Ming dynasty
- Died: 31 January 1435 (aged 35); Palace of Heavenly Purity, Forbidden City, Beijing, Ming dynasty
- Burial: Jing Mausoleum, Ming tombs, Beijing
- Spouses: Empress Gongrangzhang (m. 1417; dep. 1428); Empress Xiaogongzhang (m. 1417)
- Issue Detail: Emperor Yingzong; Jingtai Emperor
Era dates
- Xuande: (Note: Chinese: 宣德; pinyin: Xuāndé) 8 February 1426 – 17 January 1436
Posthumous name
- Emperor Xiantian Chongdao Yingming Shensheng Qinwen Zhaowu Kuanren Chunxiao Zhang (Note: Simplified Chinese: 宪天崇道英明神圣钦文昭武宽仁纯孝章皇帝; traditional Chinese: 憲天崇道英明神聖欽文昭武寬仁純孝章皇帝 (conferred by Emperor Yingzong in 1435))
Temple name
- Xuanzong (Note: Chinese: 宣宗; pinyin: Xuānzōng)
- House: Zhu
- Dynasty: Ming
- Father: Hongxi Emperor
- Mother: Empress Zhang

Chinese name
- Chinese: 宣德帝
Transcriptions
Standard Mandarin
- Hanyu Pinyin: Xuāndé Dì
- Gwoyeu Romatzyh: Shiuander dih
- Wade–Giles: Hsüan^{1}-te^{2} Ti^{4}
- IPA: [ɕɥɛ́n.tɤ̌ tî]
Yue: Cantonese
- Yale Romanization: Syūn-dāk dai
- Jyutping: Syun^{1}-dak^{1} dai^{3}
- IPA: [syn˥.tɐk̚˥ tɐj˧]
Southern Min
- Tâi-lô: Suan-tik tē

The Xuande Emperor (16 March 1399 – 31 January 1435), personal name Zhu Zhanji, (Note: Chinese: 朱瞻基; pinyin: Zhū Zhānjī) was the fifth emperor of the Ming dynasty of China, reigning from 1425 to 1435. He succeeded his father, the Hongxi Emperor.

The Xuande Emperor displayed skills in writing, painting, and military command. Upon ascending the throne, he abandoned his father's plan to move the capital from Beijing to Nanjing. The Xuande Emperor personally led a campaign to suppress his uncle Zhu Gaoxu's rebellion in 1426, forcing him to surrender. Early in his reign, a prolonged war in Ming-controlled Jiaozhi Province (present-day northern Vietnam) ended in a Ming defeat and the restoration of independence to Đại Việt.

Relations with Southeast Asian nations stayed peaceful. Communication continued with Korea, and ties were established with Japan in 1432. The northern region faced minimal Mongol threats. The Xuande Emperor permitted Zheng He's final Indian Ocean voyage in 1431–1433, and during his rule court eunuchs gained influence. The Emperor sought order through purges in the Censorate and military service reforms in 1428, but these did not fully resolve the inefficiency and low morale of the army.

The Xuande Emperor's government attempted to promote the use of paper money and discourage the use of coins and precious metals, but this effort was ultimately unsuccessful and paper money fell out of circulation. To address peasant flight from heavily taxed prefectures, particularly from Jiangnan, the Emperor reduced taxes and dispatched "grand coordinators" to the provinces to improve local governance. These coordinators were responsible for addressing issues of injustice and corruption among tax collectors, as well as assessing the state of military units. Historians have regarded his reign as the golden age of the Ming dynasty.

== Early life ==
Zhu Zhanji, the future Xuande Emperor, was born on 16 March 1399 as the eldest son of Zhu Gaochi and Lady Zhang. His father was the eldest son and heir of Zhu Di, Prince of Yan. Zhu Di's nephew, the Jianwen Emperor, was then reigning as the second emperor of China's Ming dynasty. Zhu Di rebelled against the Jianwen Emperor in the summer of 1399, defeated him in a three-year civil war, and became the Yongle Emperor in 1402.

From an early age, Zhu Zhanji was a favorite of his grandfather, with whom he shared a love of hunting and horseback riding. The Yongle Emperor allowed his grandson to accompany him on hunting trips and military inspections. In 1414, he took the prince with him on a campaign against the Mongols.

The Yongle Emperor appointed Zhu Gaochi as heir to the throne (皇太子; Huang Taizi) in 1404 and Zhu Zhanji as Imperial Grandson-heir (皇太孫; Huang Taisun) in 1411. Grand Secretary Hu Guang oversaw Zhu Zhanji's education in Confucian teachings and ways of government, and Zhu Zhanji also studied military expeditions. The Emperor sent Zhu Zhanji and his father on provincial missions to "tour and pacify", following the Hongwu Emperor's example of sending his heir, Zhu Biao, on a similar mission in 1391. In court intrigues, Zhu Zhanji consistently defended his father against the latter's younger brothers, Zhu Gaoxu and Zhu Gaosui. Zhu Zhanji's uncles were also concerned about his decisiveness, popularity with the Yongle Emperor, and close cooperation with the grand secretaries. They feared that their own positions would be threatened if Zhu Zhanji were to take the throne.

Simplified family tree of the early Ming emperors

Hongwu Emperor r. 1368–1398	Empress Ma
Zhu Biao (Heir Apparent)	Yongle Emperor r. 1402–1424	Empress Xu
Jianwen Emperor r. 1398–1402	Hongxi Emperor r. 1424–1425	Empress Zhang	Zhu Gaoxu (Prince of Han)	Zhu Gaosui (Prince of Zhao)
Xuande Emperor r. 1425–1435

== Beginning of reign ==
=== Accession ===
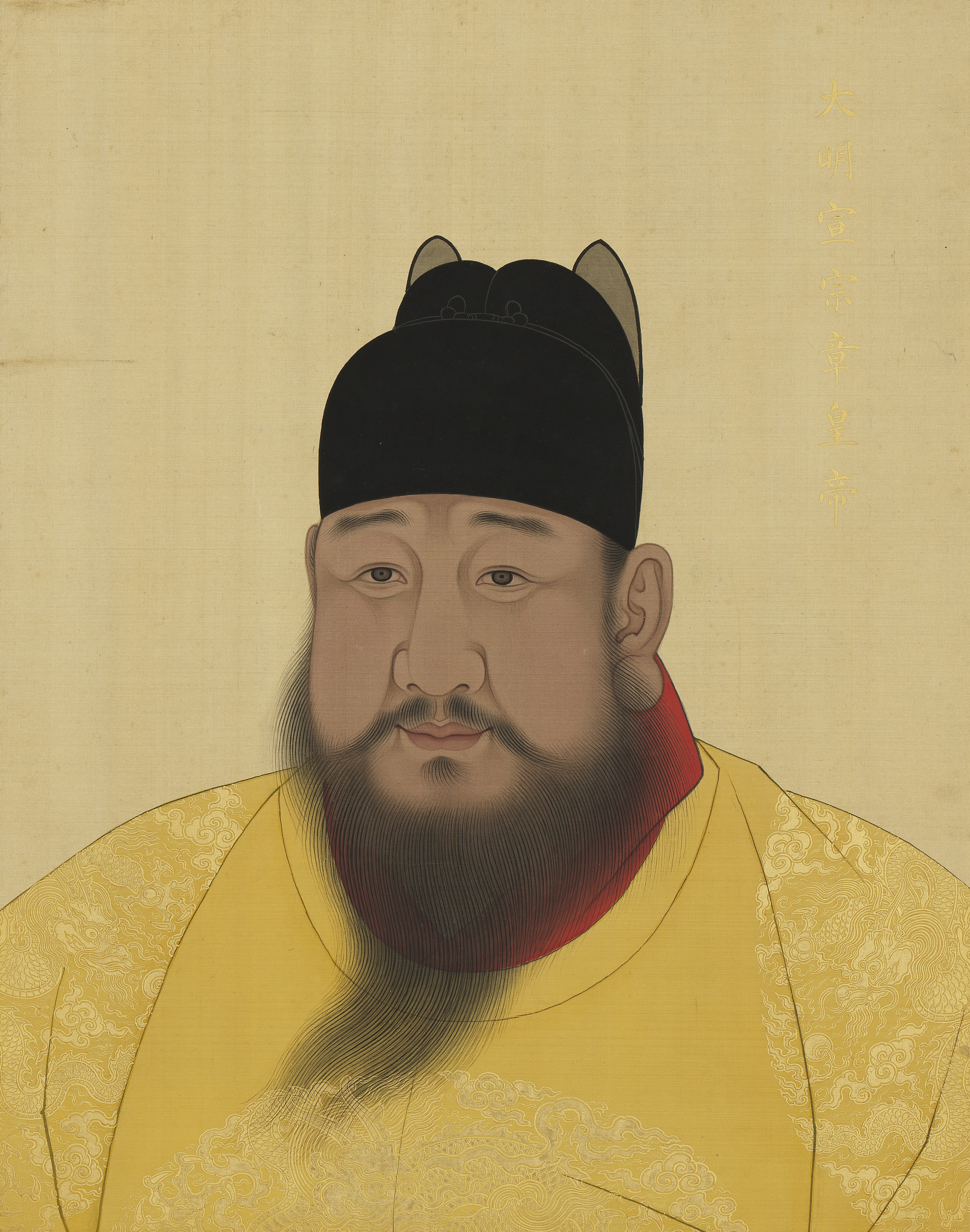
Portrait of the Xuande Emperor

The Yongle Emperor died of a stroke in August 1424 while returning from his fifth campaign against the Mongols on the Mongolian steppe. Zhu Zhanji's father ascended the throne as the Hongxi Emperor at the beginning of September and designated Zhu Zhanji as heir to the throne on 1 November. In April 1425, he sent his son to Nanjing to prepare for the planned relocation of the capital from Beijing. However, the Hongxi Emperor's health deteriorated and he called the prince back, but died before his son could return.

On 27 June 1425, Zhu Zhanji officially ascended the imperial throne in Beijing, becoming the fifth emperor of the Ming dynasty. He chose to cancel the move of the capital to Nanjing due to his familiarity with Beijing, where he grew up, and his shared concern with the Yongle Emperor for the security of the northern border. He adopted the era name Xuande, which means "proclamation of virtue".

The Xuande Emperor's accession prompted no major political or governmental changes, as he shared his father's character and idealistic yet conservative view of imperial rule. He was not only a skilled writer, but also a patron of the arts. Despite his short temper, he was open to advice. He sought to balance the influence of various factions within the Ming elite, including civil officials, court eunuchs, and generals. In issuing imperial decrees, he generally relied on proposals from the grand secretaries and ministers, but sometimes made decisions independently. Historian Frederick W. Mote states that, unlike his predecessors, the Emperor led a life of luxury and debauchery, and that thousands of women were released from the imperial palace following his death.

Despite this, the Xuande Emperor successfully resolved major issues during the first two years of his reign, including his uncle Zhu Gaoxu's rebellion and the war in Đại Việt (present-day northern Vietnam). Under his rule, the northern border remained relatively stable, and peaceful relations were maintained with neighboring states in Central, East, and Southeast Asia. This stability allowed for internal reforms to take place.

=== Zhu Gaoxu rebellion ===
Zhu Gaoxu challenged his nephew's accession, but he was unsuccessful in his attempt. The Yongle Emperor had favored Zhu Gaoxu due to his military prowess, but Zhu Gaoxu's arrogance and contempt towards the Hongxi Emperor caused tension. Eventually, he was banished to the remote city of Le'an in Qingzhou prefecture, Shandong. Believing that he was the rightful heir to the throne instead of his ailing brother, he began plotting a coup after his brother's death. On 2 September 1425, Zhu Gaoxu rebelled against the Xuande Emperor. He accused the Xuande Emperor of abusing his power by granting noble titles to civil officials in violation of the precedents established by the Yongle and Hongxi emperors, and of exercising poor judgment in appointing officials. Underestimating his young nephew as a formidable opponent, he also failed to recognize the strength of the government, which had functioned effectively during the Yongle Emperor's extended absences on campaigns in Mongolia. Furthermore, he did not consider the significant decrease in the princes' influence that the Yongle Emperor had achieved.

The Emperor initially hesitated to take action but eventually yielded to pressure from Grand Secretary Yang Rong and other advisors, taking personal command of the punitive expedition on 9 September. A vanguard of 20,000 soldiers under the general Xue Lu (薛祿; 1358–1430) laid siege to Le'an on 21 September. Despite the defenders' refusal to surrender, the imperial army successfully captured the city the following day. Zhu Gaoxu was subsequently brought to Beijing, demoted to a common subject, and ultimately tortured to death. In addition, over 600 of his followers were executed, while another 2,200 were deported to the border. An investigation revealed that other relatives of the Emperor, including Zhu Gaoxu's brother Zhu Gaosui, were also involved in the rebellion, but they were not punished, in order to maintain dynastic stability.

== Government and administration ==
=== Grand secretaries, ministers, and eunuchs ===
The Xuande Emperor retained his father's advisors and ministers, but some offices underwent changes in their functions. The most significant reforms were made to the grand secretaries, who, during the Yongle Emperor's reign, only had an advisory role of reading the Emperor's correspondence and drafting replies. During the reign of the Hongxi Emperor, they were granted real executive power. This was formalized by granting them ministerial titles–Yang Shiqi became minister of war, Huang Huai became minister of revenue, and Jin Youzi (金幼孜) minister of rites. Due to their long service to the state, the Xuande Emperor highly respected and trusted them. The grand secretaries who served during his reign included Yang Rong, Yang Shiqi, Jin Youzi, Huang Huai, Yang Pu, Zhang Ying (張瑛), Quan Jin (權謹), and Chen Shan (陳山). (Note: Yang Rong served as grand secretary from 1402 to 1440; Yang Shiqi from 1402 to 1444; Jin Youzi from 1402 to 1431; Huang Huai from 1402 to 1414 and again from 1424 to 1427; Yang Pu from 1424 to 1446; Zhang Ying from 1426 to 1429; Quan Jin in 1425; and Chen Shan from 1427 to 1429. From 1424 to 1444, Yang Shiqi served as head of the Grand Secretariat.) Other close advisors to the Emperor included Minister of Personnel Jian Yi (蹇義) (Note: In office 1402–1422 and 1423–1435.) and Minister of Revenue Xia Yuanji. (Note: In office 1402–1421 and 1424–1430.) Even after the Xuande Emperor's death, the composition of the most influential officials and the grand secretaries remained unchanged. The same group of people dominated the top government from 1424 until the early 1440s.

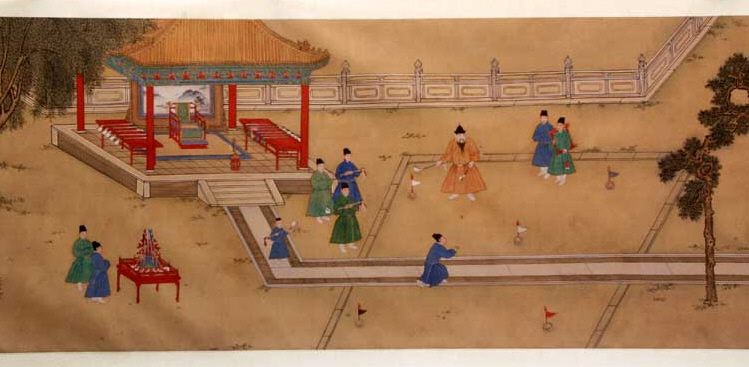
Emperor Xuanzong at Leisure, a painting by an unknown Ming artist, painted on silk during the Xuande era (1426–1435). In the painting, the Xuande Emperor is depicted playing chuiwan, a Chinese game similar to golf, with eunuchs.

The Emperor established a process for routine and important decrees, in which the grand secretaries would review and evaluate proposals from various offices. The secretaries would then attach their recommendations for solving issues to the documents, which the Emperor would typically approve and send to the relevant ministries for implementation. The Emperor made significant government decisions during meetings with the grand secretaries. The ministers were responsible for carrying out these decrees. This system allowed for faster and more flexible decision-making, as the secretaries no longer needed to consult with the ministers beforehand.

At the same time, the influence of the palace eunuchs grew. The Hongwu Emperor prohibited eunuchs from communicating with government authorities, and even the Yongle Emperor maintained strict control over them. The Xuande Emperor, on the other hand, provided them with education and utilized them more in confidential correspondence. According to historian Chan Hok-lam, the main reason was his need for trusted servants to handle his personal paperwork, as no other group could offer comparable loyalty and discretion. Despite repeated attempts by officials to abolish eunuch-directed procurements such as timber cutting and shipbuilding, the Emperor increasingly relied on eunuchs to oversee activities of personal interest to him. In situations where the Emperor did not agree with the ideas of grand secretaries, he would use eunuchs to convey his orders to lower branches of the state administration. As the ministers did not question the Emperor's orders, the eunuchs were able to give orders to the ministers on behalf of the sovereign without his knowledge. However, the Xuande Emperor maintained control over the eunuchs and was not afraid to execute them if they overstepped their boundaries. In the long run, this approach allowed eunuchs to exploit their power if a less assertive emperor was in power.

=== Censorate, provincial administration, and army ===
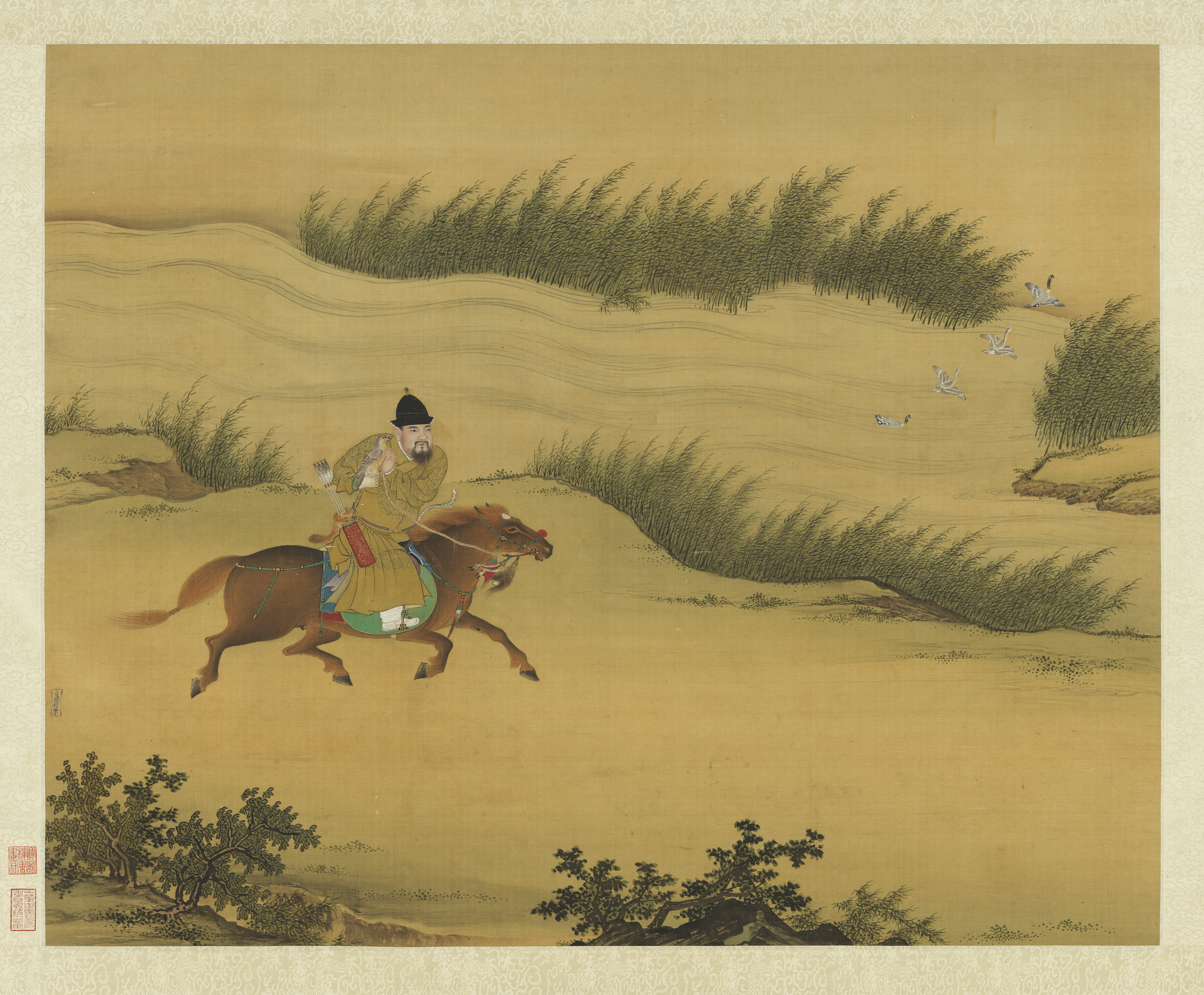
Emperor Xuanzong of the Ming on Horseback, by an unknown Ming artist

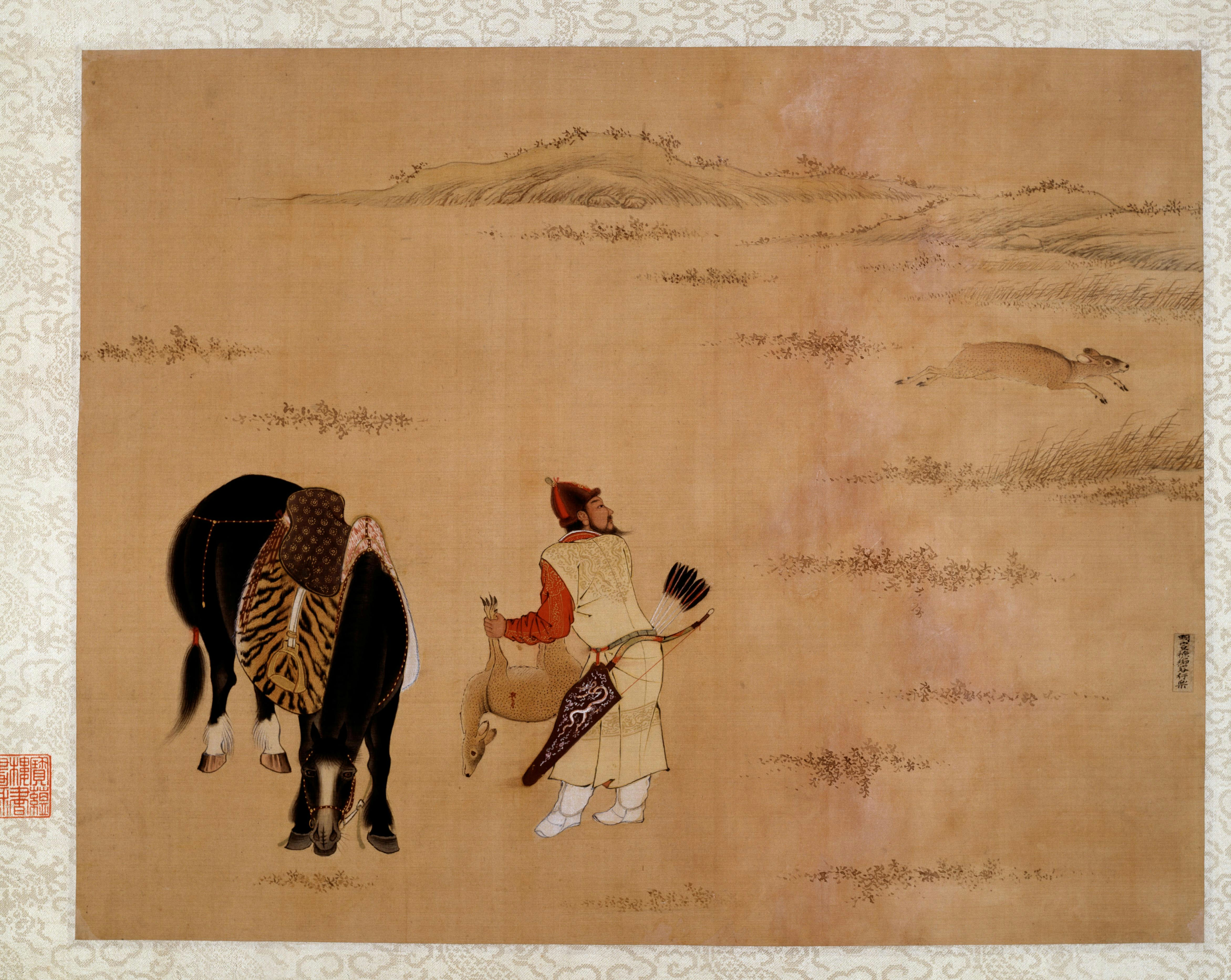
Hunting of Emperor Xuanzong of Ming Dynasty with arrows, by an unknown Ming artist

In terms of internal politics, the Emperor focused on implementing reforms in the Censorate, local administration, and the army. His main goal was to bring discipline and order to the state administration. He also took a keen interest in prominent criminal cases and often ordered judgments to be reviewed, resulting in justice for thousands of innocent people. In August 1428, he replaced Liu Quan (劉觀), who had headed the Censorate since 1415, with Gu Zuo (顧佐), an official known for his integrity. Within a few months, Gu dismissed 43 censors from the Beijing and Nanjing offices, and Liu Quan himself was punished for numerous abuses of power. The Censorate underwent a reorganization, with changes made to procedures and an increase in the powers of the censors. Additionally, commissioners were appointed to oversee military farming colonies, large construction projects, and military training camps near Beijing, as well as to manage taxes in Nanzhili. These taxes were collected in the form of products, mainly rice, which was crucial for the nutrition of the people of Beijing.

After the purge of 1428, the censors became more competent and more outspoken in their criticisms. This was evident in their thorough checks of all branches of the state administration, including both civil and military sectors. Over 240 officials were dismissed between 1424 and 1434, which was three times the number of dismissals in the previous decade. While officials and censors who abused their powers were punished, they were not executed.

During the reign of the Xuande Emperor, the regional administration saw a regular posting of grand coordinators (巡撫; xunfu). These officials were responsible for coordinating the work of the three provincial offices—civil, military, and surveillance. This practice of having coordinators in the regional administration was not new, as previous emperors had also employed them. The Xuande Emperor extended this practice by sending these officials on long-term assignments, rather than just once like his predecessors. For example, in September 1425, he sent two commissioners to Nanzhili and Zhejiang, and in 1430, they were sent to Hunan, Shanxi, and Sichuan. They were also dispatched to Jiangxi and Shaanxi around 1426.

The role of grand coordinators was not an independent function, but rather a mandate imposed on high-ranking officials of the central authorities. These officials typically served as deputy ministers, particularly in the military, before rising to senior positions in the Censorate and serving as (co-)superintendents of military affairs. This gave them the authority to oversee civil, military, and surveillance offices. The immediate result of implementing grand coordinators was the transfer of command over troops in the provinces to civilian hands.

Considerable problems persisted in the army during this time period. Corrupt officers were known to bring in poor conscripts for campaigns, while allowing the wealthy to avoid service for a fee. These officers also embezzled the salaries of the soldiers and used them as personal servants. The military farming colonies also failed to supply the army with enough provisions. Additionally, capable officers had limited opportunities for advancement during times of peace, resulting in the army being led by individuals who inherited their positions without merit. These commanders, who had not experienced war themselves, often neglected to properly train their soldiers and instead used them for their own personal needs. This led to a decline in discipline, an increase in desertion, and a decrease in the overall strength of the army.

In an attempt to address these issues, inspection officials were appointed in 1427 to verify the condition and numbers of the army detachments and restore discipline. Civil authorities also assumed oversight of local military headquarters, but these measures had limited effect, as officers continued to appropriate military lands for personal use and encourage desertions to embezzle funds allocated for their soldiers' support. In 1429, the Emperor held a large military parade featuring guard units from the Beijing garrison and three training camps around the city in an effort to boost morale, but the event had little effect. The years of peace had led to a decline in the quality of training, and the Emperor's leniency towards guilty officers only worsened the situation.

== Economic policy ==
=== Finance and currency ===
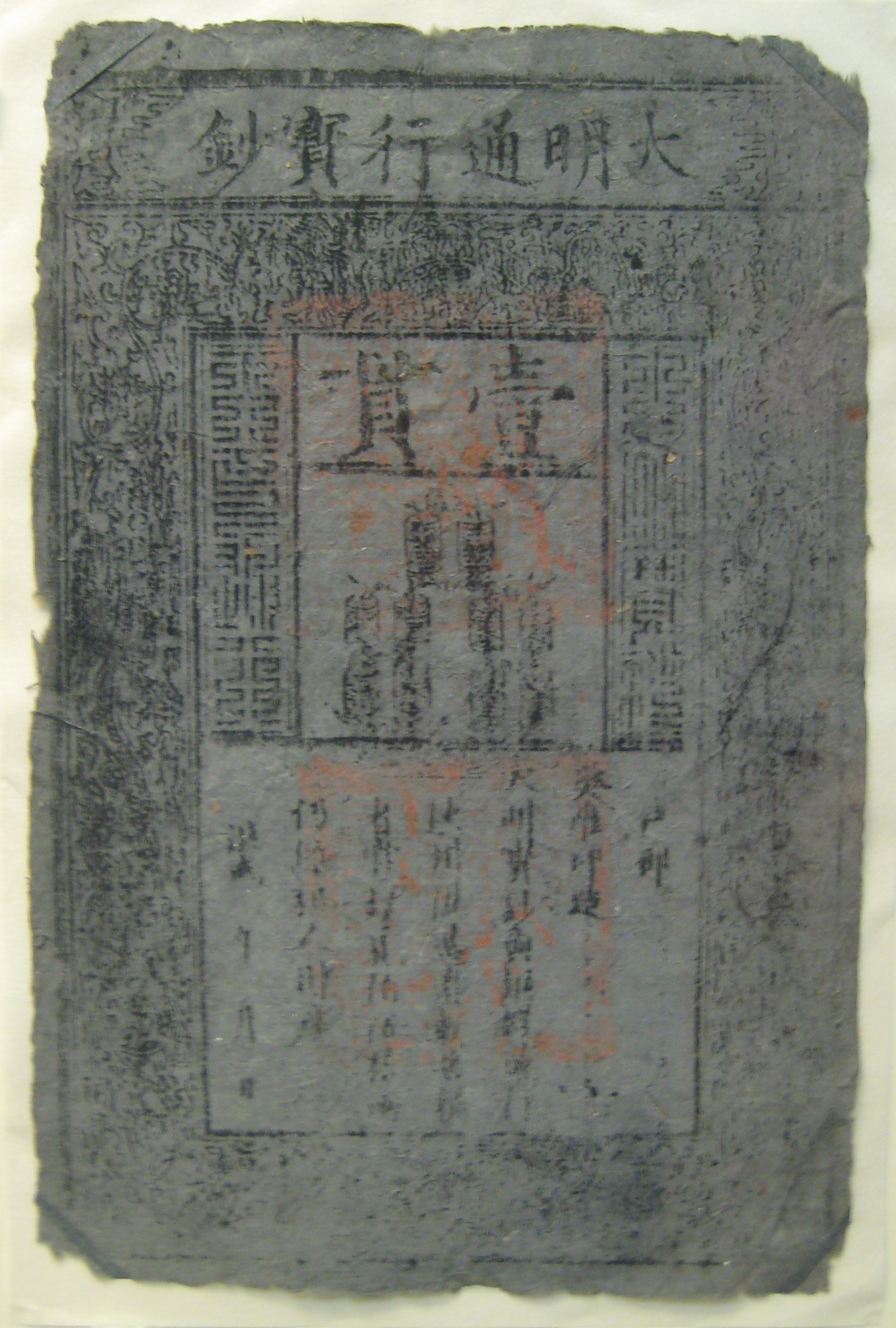
Ming dynasty paper money

In the late 1420s, the Xuande Emperor's government faced significant financial challenges. The ongoing war in Đại Việt drained a significant amount of resources, and the subsequent loss of mineral wealth in the region further exacerbated the situation. The imposition of high taxes and levies placed an unbearable burden on the economy of wealthy regions in China, resulting in a decline in government revenue. For example, the wealthy Suzhou was three years behind in paying its taxes by the late 1420s. Moreover, the profitability of silver and copper mines declined in the early 1430s. To address these difficulties, the government attempted to promote the use of paper money, reduce and reform taxes, and limit government spending.

The government partially resumed precious metal mining after excessive issuance of the baochao, the paper money that served as the primary form of currency, had reduced their value to just 2% of face value by 1425, amid copper coin shortages and mining restrictions imposed during the Hongxi era. The Xuande Emperor and his advisors sought to bolster the economy by restricting copper coins, which competed with paper money, nearly eliminating them from circulation. Minister of Revenue Xia Yuanji proposed raising business taxes and accepting only paper money to counter its depreciation, but the measures proved ineffective. The government then shifted to a more cautious strategy, selling licenses to trade salt in exchange for paper money. This measure also failed to increase the value of the notes. The government introduced new trade fees and customs duties on the Grand Canal, an important transportation route connecting northern and southern China. These fees could only be paid in paper money, but they negatively affected trade and were eventually abolished after a few years. The value of paper money continued to decline. By the 1430s, it had largely fallen out of use, surviving mainly as a limited means of paying employees, and it was no longer required for the payment of trade levies.

The widespread distrust of paper currency and a shortage of coins fueled the growth of silver trade. Although attempts to prohibit silver in commercial transactions proved unsuccessful, silver supplies remained insufficient to meet market demand. It was primarily used for large payments and paying taxes, while copper coins remained the preferred currency for smaller transactions in cities.

In 1433, the Xuande government closed the mints, causing disruptions throughout the region from Japan to Java. This halt in coin production led to a surge in counterfeit coins and hoarding of precious metals. Imperial officials could neither suppress the circulation of privately minted coins nor resume state coin production. Towards the end of the Xuande era, the government began to tolerate the use of silver. In 1433, Governor of Nanzhili Zhou Chen (周忱) began to collect land taxes in silver in the most heavily burdened prefectures of Jiangnan.

=== Taxation in Jiangnan and the empire ===
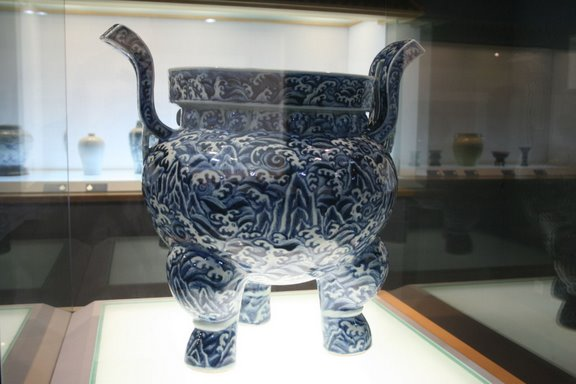
A porcelain ding vessel from the Xuande era

One of the areas that the Emperor focused on for reform was fiscal policy, particularly in Jiangnan. This region, which includes prefectures such as Suzhou, Hangzhou, Songjiang, Jiaxing, and Zhenjiang, contributed a significant portion of the empire's land tax, accounting for a quarter of the total amount. In Suzhou alone, even after a reduction in the tax rate in 1393, the land tax still made up almost a tenth of the empire's total tax quota, equivalent to 2.81 million dan of rice (with 1 dan being equivalent to 107.4 liters). Additionally, Songjiang contributed 4.14% of the total tax quota.

During the Yongle Emperor's reign, land tax revenue increased by 10%, placing a heavy burden on peasants in Suzhou and Songjiang and leading to growing tax arrears. Natural disasters in the later years of his reign further drove peasants to abandon their land, and by 1422–1428, annual arrears had reached several million dan of rice. This posed a serious threat to the supply of Beijing, which relied on tax rice shipped from Jiangnan. In August 1426, imperial commissioner Zhou Gan (周干) was tasked with investigating the situation on the ground. He proposed a plan to reduce taxes, eliminate corruption in tax collection, and improve local administration with the help of experts sent from headquarters, led by a special commissioner. The Ministry of Revenue delayed the tax reduction for four years out of concern over its potential impact, and the imperial decree authorizing it was not issued until May 1430.

In October 1430, the Emperor dispatched a group of high-ranking officials (zongdu) to oversee the collection of taxes. Among them was Left Vice Minister of Works Zhou Chen, who was sent to Nanzhili. Along with Kuang Zhong (况钟), the prefect of Suzhou since June 1430, they played a significant role in implementing tax reforms in Jiangnan. In Suzhou and Songjiang, they found large-scale flight of farming families escaping heavy taxes. Zhou noted that in Taicang County in Suzhou, the number of taxpaying households fell by 90 percent between 1391 and 1432, to 738, while the county's tax quota remained unchanged. To address this issue, he introduced five major measures:

- unified measures and weights to prevent collectors from cheating;
- in each county, warehouses were established to replace the private barns previously used by tax captains to store tax rice;
- the government introduced a "leveling grain" (平米法; pingmi fa) surcharge on grain taxes from both public and private lands to fund transport along the Grand Canal to the capital, with any surplus stored for emergencies. Taxpayers delivered grain to local collection points, while soldiers handled the onward shipment, relieving taxpayers of the burden of transporting it themselves;
- in each county, relief granaries (濟農倉; jinong cang) were established to store grain collected during years of good harvests as a safeguard against famine;
- introduced the collection of a portion of taxes not in rice, but in silver (Note: The so-called "gold flower silver" (金花银; jinhuayin)) and fabrics, which provided considerable convenience to both taxpayers and the government, and in the southern regions of the empire, it promoted the monetization of the economy and the textile industry.

The court generally agreed with the proposals of Zhou Chen and Kuang Zhong, but the Ministry of Revenue blocked them. It was not until 1433 that they received imperial approval to reduce taxes in Suzhou by a quarter. Other reforms in the same direction continued after 1436.

During natural disasters and epidemics, the Xuande government acted swiftly to aid the population. Specially appointed commissioners oversaw the distribution of grain from government stocks, as well as implementing a 20–40% reduction in land taxes and forgiving other taxes for a period of one to two years. In comparison to previous reigns, land tax revenue during the Xuande era decreased to 30 million dan of rice, which was 8% less than during the Hongxi era and 5% less than during the Yongle era.

== Foreign policy ==
=== Đại Việt ===
During the early years of the Xuande era, a major issue was the ongoing war in Đại Việt, then administered by the Ming as Jiaozhi Province, which had begun in 1408. In 1425, Ming troops, led by newly appointed commanders Li An (李安) and Chen Zhi (陳智), suffered multiple defeats at the hands of the Viets, led by Lê Lợi. The Emperor appointed a new commander, Wang Tong (王通), and a new head of civil administration, Minister Chen Qia (陳洽), in May 1426. When consulting his advisors, the Emperor revealed his inclination to end the conflict and grant the Viet self-rule. Ministers Jian Yi and Xia Yuanji advocated using military force to suppress Viet resistance, while the grand secretaries Yang Shiqi and Yang Yong suggested withdrawing from Đại Việt, but due to conflicting opinions, the meeting ended without a resolution.

In the winter of 1426, the Ming army suffered heavy losses of 20,000–30,000 men due to the Viet attacks. The Emperor issued orders in January 1427 for Mu Sheng, the commander of Yunnan troops, to gather an army in Yunnan and bring it to Đại Việt. Additionally, Liu Sheng (柳升) was tasked with leading a second army from Guangxi. The experienced Huang Fu (黃福), who had previously administered the province from 1407 to 1424, was appointed to oversee its civil administration. Meanwhile, Lê Lợi continued to expand his operations into the Red River Valley, posing a threat to the provincial capital Đông Quan (present-day Hanoi). The Ming garrison successfully defended against the attack on Đông Quan, but due to the incompetence of Wang Tong, the Ming forces failed to capitalize on their success, allowing the Viets to prepare for the arrival of reinforcements.

On 30 September 1427, Liu Sheng's army reached the border, where Lê Lợi unexpectedly proposed handing over power to Trần Cảo, a descendant of the Trần dynasty. This proposal was made under the condition that Trần Cảo would rule under Chinese suzerainty. However, Lê Lợi lured Liu Sheng's army into a trap, inflicting a crushing defeat on the Ming forces and killing approximately 70,000 troops. In the aftermath of this disaster, Wang Tong, without the Emperor's knowledge, accepted Lê Lợi's proposal and began withdrawing troops from Đại Việt on 12 November. Mu Sheng had reached the upper reaches of the Red River and begun constructing ships for a downstream advance. Upon learning of Wang Tong's withdrawal, he retreated to China.

On 16 November 1427, the Xuande Emperor was informed of Lê Lợi's offer. Despite divided opinions from his advisors, the Emperor quickly decided to accept the proposal on 20 November. A delegation was immediately sent to Đại Việt to negotiate the details. The Viets saw this move as the Ming surrendering after their defeat in battle, solidifying Lê Lợi's prestige. Seeking recognition as king, Lê Lợi informed the negotiators that Trần Cảo had died, and with him the Trần royal line. He also refused to repatriate Chinese prisoners and officials. The Xuande Emperor, however, refused to recognize Lê Lợi as the ruler of Đại Việt and demanded the return of the Trần dynasty. It was not until 1431 that he appointed Lê Lợi to "administer the affairs of the state of Annam", without conferring upon him the title of king. The Ming's withdrawal from Đại Việt was a blow to their pride and prestige, but it also provided much-needed financial relief.

=== Southeast Asia and the Indian Ocean ===
The Seventh Voyage of Zheng He: the journey of the main fleet from China to Hormuz; the expected route of the Hong Bao squadron—to Bengal, Arabia, and Africa; the pilgrimage of seven Chinese men (including Ma Huan) from Calicut to Mecca and Medina; the places visited by the Chinese during the seven voyages of Zheng He; the Arab cities visited by Ma Huan.

Envoys from Southeast Asian countries, such as Champa, Java, Ayutthaya, and Sumatra, regularly visited Beijing, but there were no envoys from the Indian Ocean coast. The Ming government's ban on overseas voyages, whether for overseas settlement or commercial activities, remained in force but was poorly enforced. (Note: The Ming government viewed private trade as corrupting and banned private foreign trade through a strict maritime ban. The Ming forbade its people to leave the empire, and foreigners and anyone trading with them faced harsh punishments, including death or exile. Ships with two or more masts could not be built, ships and ports were destroyed or blocked, and the coast was heavily guarded. The policy aimed to end foreign trade entirely and was summarized in the slogan "not even a piece of wood should sail across the sea". Instead of ending foreign commerce, the ban increased smuggling, and government crackdowns were largely ineffective.) Government officials (Note: At the forefront of the opponents of long-distance voyages were Grand Secretary Yang Shiqi and the Minister of Revenue Xia Yuanji.) strongly opposed long-distance voyages and influenced the Emperor to cancel a shipbuilding program in 1429, led by the Emperor's eunuchs. A few months later, after the death of a leading opponent of the voyages, Xia Yuanji, the Emperor changed his mind. The last of Zheng He's great expeditions took place in 1430–33, possibly to restore the empire's prestige after their retreat from Đại Việt. Zheng He brought envoys from Sri Lanka, Cochin, Calicut, Hormuz, Aden, the East African coast, and other countries to China, which pleased the Emperor.

After the Xuande Emperor's death, the Ming did not undertake any further long-distance expeditions. The palace eunuchs supported these expeditions, but the Confucian officials opposed them. With the opening of the Grand Canal, the need to transport rice by sea to the north disappeared, leading officials to view naval expeditions as expensive and unnecessary imperial ventures. In the long run, this decision weakened the morale and strength of the Ming fleet, leaving them later unable to effectively deal with the wokou pirates. Additionally, it diminished China's influence in Southeast Asia and the Indian Ocean. The end of the early Ming period marked the end of China's 300-year dominance in the East Asian seas.

=== Mongolia ===
During the Xuande era, there was relative calm on the northern border. The Jurchens, who lived in present-day Manchuria, acknowledged Ming sovereignty and did not oppose the expeditions led by eunuch Yishiha. These expeditions even reached the mouth of the Amur River. Toghon led the Western Mongolian Oirats. Arughtai ruled the Eastern Mongols but did not gain the recognition of the Uriankhai Mongols in the southeast of Mongolia. He therefore maintained friendly relations with the Ming dynasty and engaged in trade, exchanging horses for silk and tea.

In October 1428, the Xuande Emperor led an inspection of the borderlands accompanied by 3,000 soldiers, during which Uriankhai raiders were successfully repelled. The Emperor also led several minor skirmishes on the steppe, during one of which he killed several Mongol warriors with arrows from his bow. By May 1430, the Chinese had fortified cities along the border between China and the steppe (along the later Great Wall of China) south of Kaiping (the last Ming garrison in the steppe) and then withdrew from it. This shortened the border, providing relief to exhausted troops, but made it much more challenging for the Chinese to conduct raids against the Mongols.

The Ming government had hoped that the Eastern Mongols would be able to defeat the Oirats, but the Oirats proved to be stronger and launched repeated attacks against the Eastern Mongols. In September 1434, the Oirats were successful in defeating and killing Arughtai. After this victory, Toghon maintained good relations with the Ming dynasty.

=== Japan and Korea ===
The Xuande Emperor made repeated attempts to establish relations with Japan, but the shogun Ashikaga Yoshimochi (r. 1394–1428) adamantly refused any communication. However, his successor Yoshinori (r. 1429–1441) was very interested in trade with China. In 1432, through the mediation of the king of the Ryukyu Islands, Ming envoys arrived at the shogun's court. (Note: The mission was led by the eunuch Chai Shan (柴山).) The first Japanese delegation arrived in China in June 1433, bringing horses, armor, swords, and other goods. They also brought 2.6 tons of copper. The Ming government paid for these goods with banknotes (baochao), and the Japanese immediately exchanged one-fifth of these banknotes for silk and the rest for copper coins.

The Ming authorities only accepted Japanese traders at the port of Ningbo. After 1433, Japanese delegations arriving in China were primarily composed of agents of feudal lords, monasteries, and temples who were eager to access the Chinese market. Along with luxury goods, they were particularly interested in Chinese copper coins. This trade proved to be highly profitable for the Japanese, leading to a lasting relationship between the two countries until 1529. However, there were frequent disputes over the valuation of Japanese goods and the Ming government often complained about the Japanese government's inability to control piracy.

Relations with Korea were generally peaceful, with regular delegations traveling between the two capitals. According to Chinese records, the Emperor often requested horses from the Koreans, while also asking them not to send gold, silver, or other unusual gifts that were not produced in their country. Additionally, the Emperor rejected a request to admit Korean students to the Imperial University in Beijing, instead donating a collection of Confucian classics and historical literature to Korea as a replacement. While the official Chinese description of the relationship emphasizes mutual respect, Korean records highlight the Emperor's personal motives for his requests—including a desire for women, (Note: After the Emperor's death, the Ming government allowed 53 Korean women to return to their homeland. Several thousand Chinese women were also released from service in the Forbidden City.) falcons, hunting dogs, tigers, cooks, and eunuchs.

== The Emperor as an artist ==
Frederick W. Mote described the Xuande Emperor as embodying the virtues of both a Chinese warrior and a scholar. He was a talented artist and poet, and often found more enjoyment in art and leisure than in his duties as ruler. He was known for his skill in calligraphy, poetry, writing, and painting. He painted landscapes, figures, "grass and insects", and particularly enjoyed the genre of "flowers and birds". He was especially skilled in depicting animals, particularly dogs. He drew inspiration from the techniques and styles of literati painters of his time, particularly Xia Chang. He typically used ink without the use of colors, choosing subjects with symbolic and allegorical meanings. Mote regarded him as the finest painter among Chinese emperors since Emperor Huizong of Song (r. 1100–1126).

Some of the Xuande Emperor's works are held by prestigious institutions such as the National Palace Museum in Taipei, the Palace Museum in Beijing, and formerly in the Arthur M. Sackler Museum (a division of Harvard Art Museum) in Cambridge, Massachusetts. In 2007, Robert D. Mowry, the curator of Chinese Art Collections at the Arthur M. Sackler Museum, described him as "the only Ming emperor who displayed genuine artistic talent and interest". The Dutch orientalist Robert van Gulik praised one of the Xuande Emperor's paintings, Gibbons at play, as "ably executed" although "not a great work of art". The vibrant paintings suggest that the Emperor painted from real animals (including dogs, gibbons and cats), likely kept in the palace gardens.

Not only did the Emperor engage with art, but he also actively supported and influenced artistic trends of his time. He personally evaluated the works of painters applying for court positions and aimed to elevate court painting to the level of the peak of Song-era culture in the early 12th century. He also financially supported several calligraphers and painters, such as Shang Xi, by appointing them as officers of the Imperial Guard. His reign is also renowned for its exceptional craftsmanship in bronzes and porcelain, particularly the Jingdezhen blue and white porcelain.

The Xuande Emperor's paintings

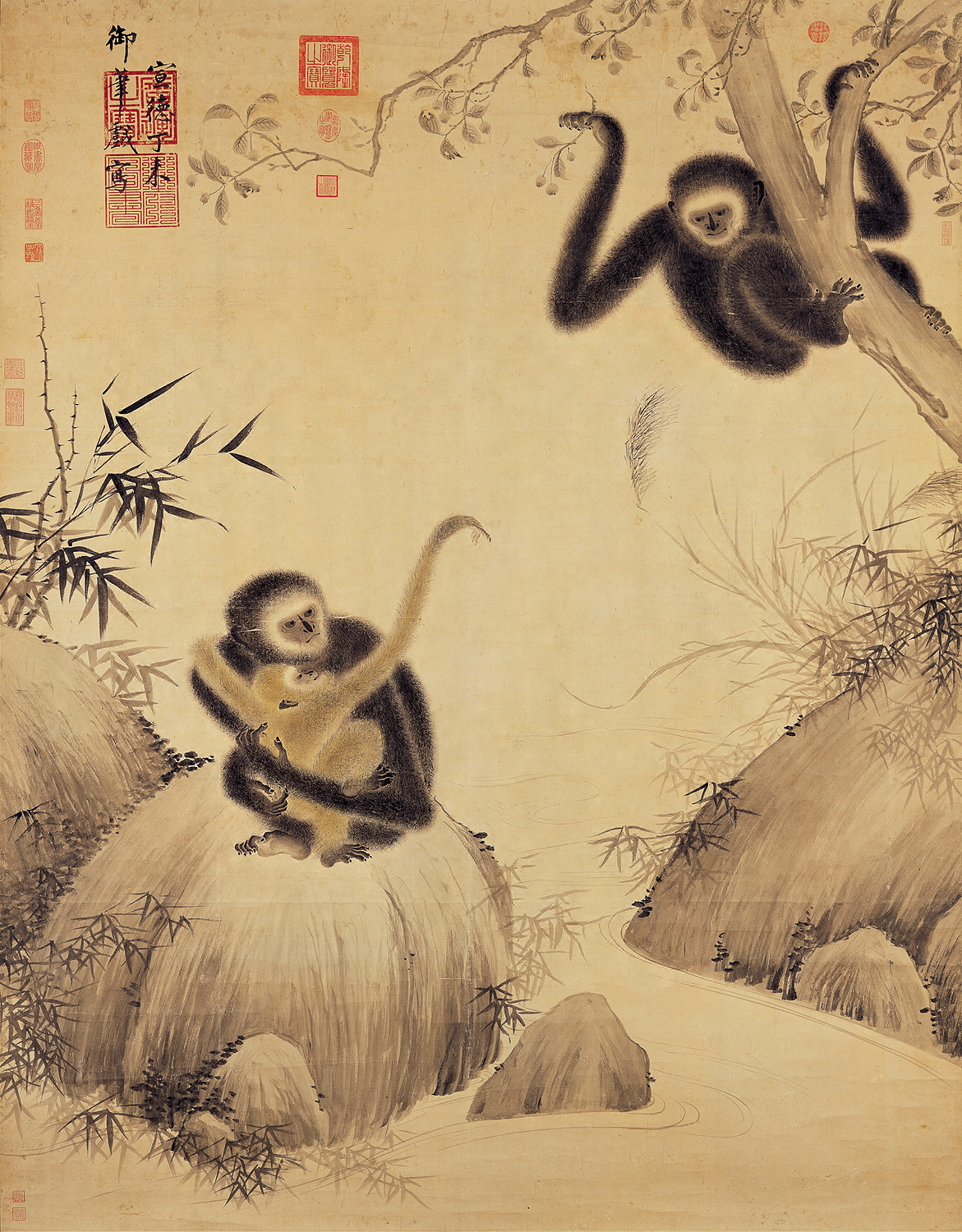
Gibbons at play (戲猿圖; 1427), National Palace Museum, Taipei, Taiwan

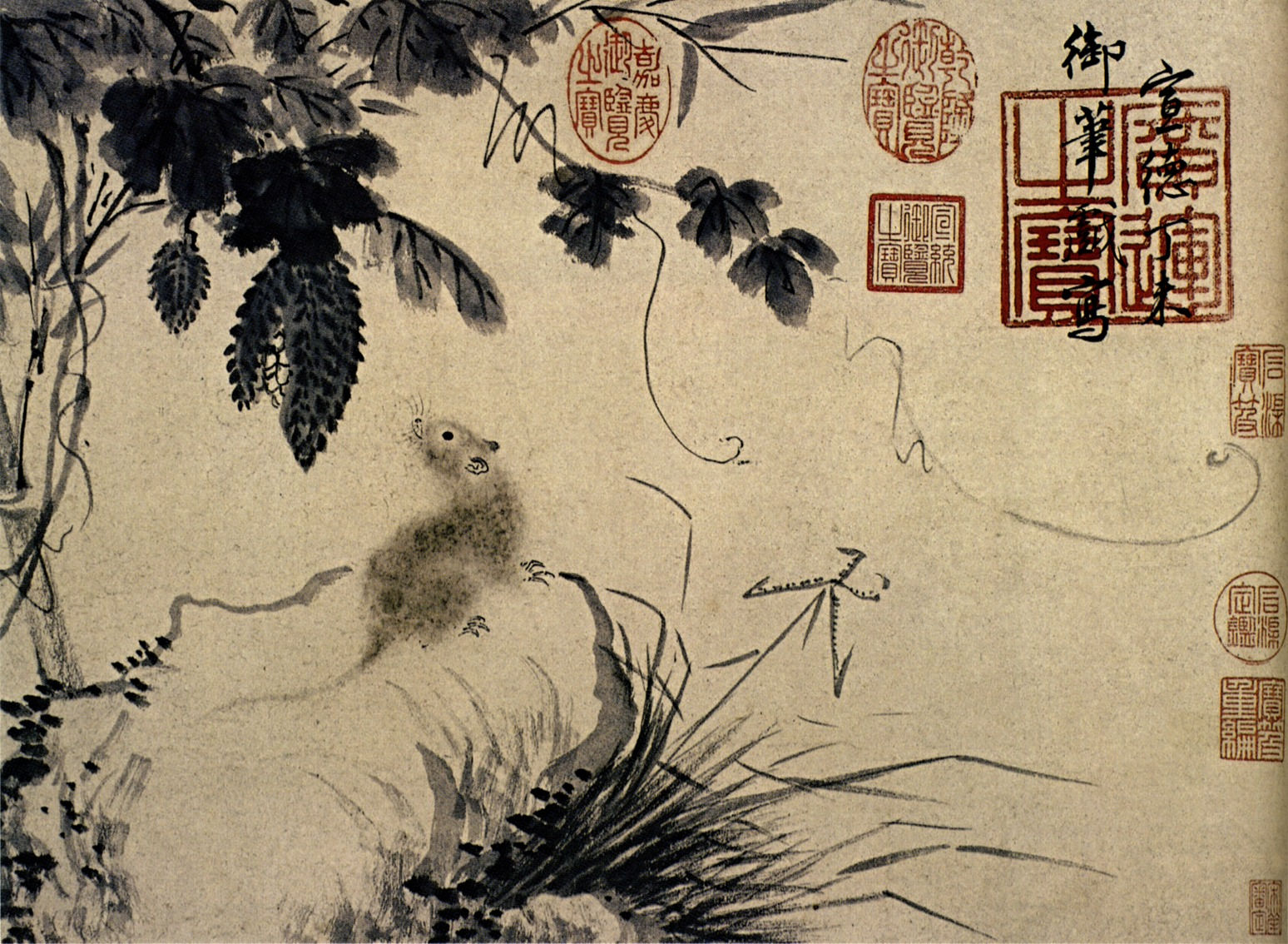
Mouse and Stone (苦瓜鼠圖; 1427), The Palace Museum, Beijing

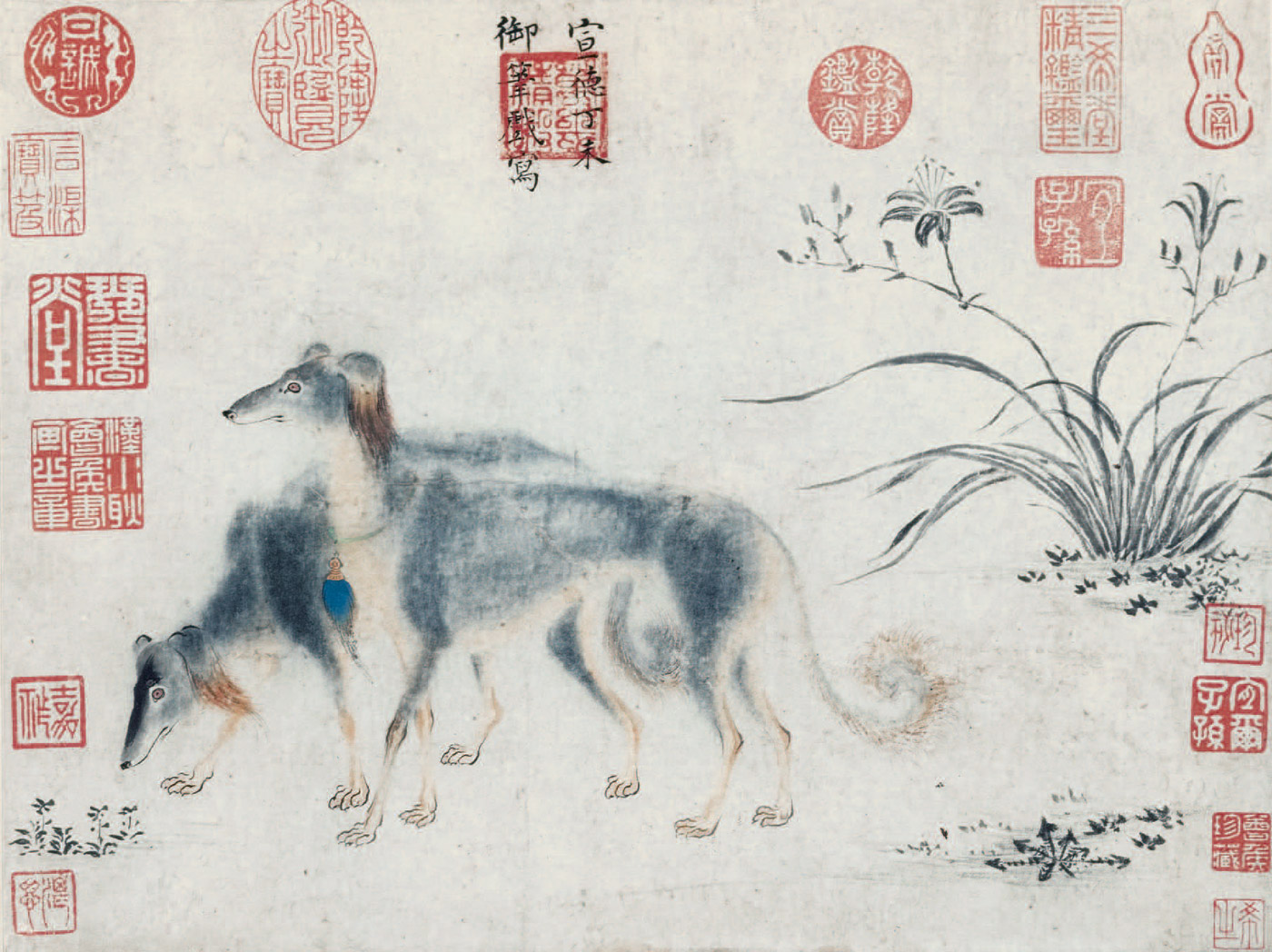
Two Saluki Hounds (猎犬圖; 1427), Harvard Art Museum, United States

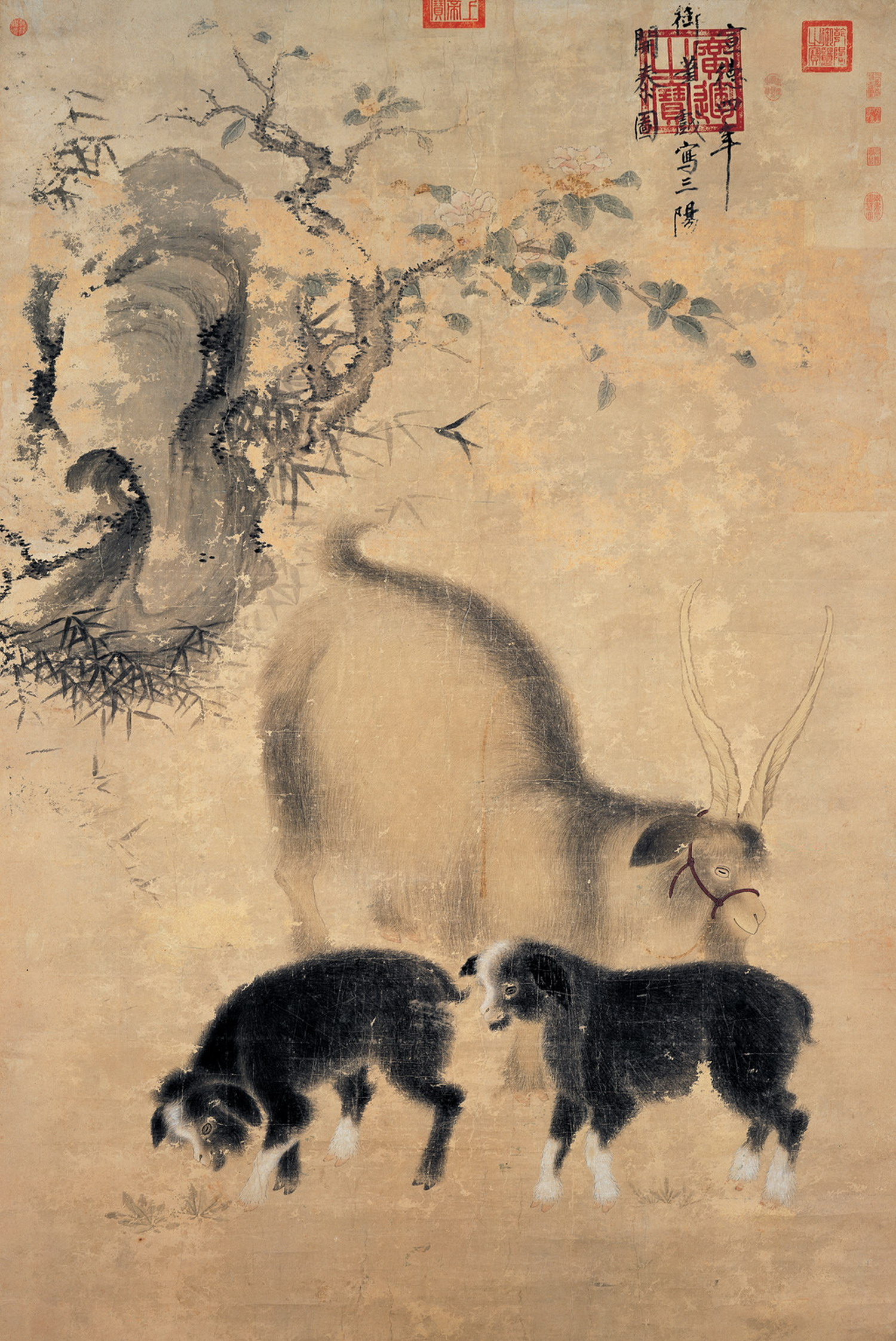
Three Yang [Goats], an Auspicious Start (to the New Year) (三陽開泰; 1429), National Palace Museum

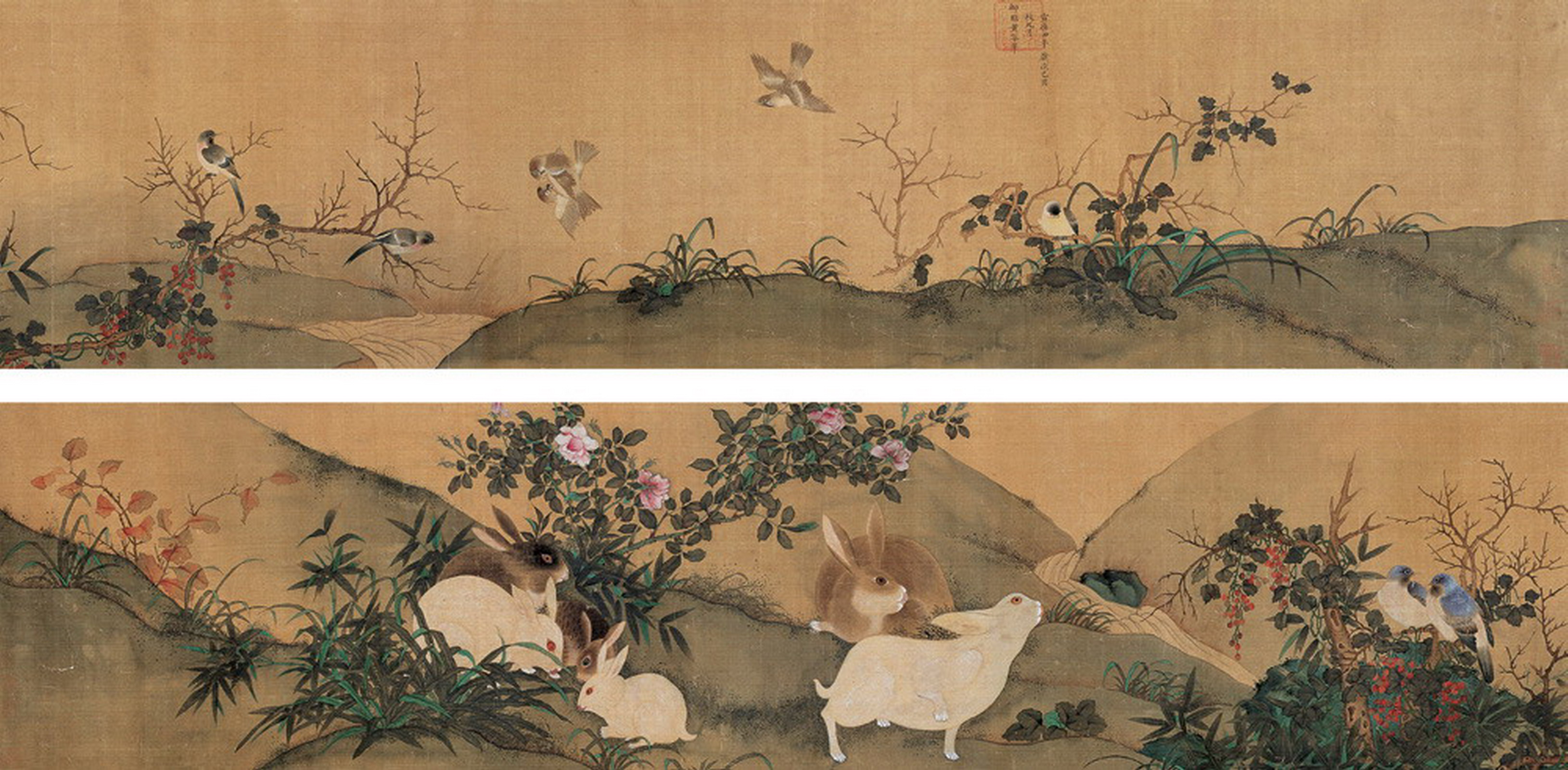
Imperial Imitation of Huang Quan's Flower-and-Bird Painting (御臨黃筌花鳥; 1429), National Palace Museum

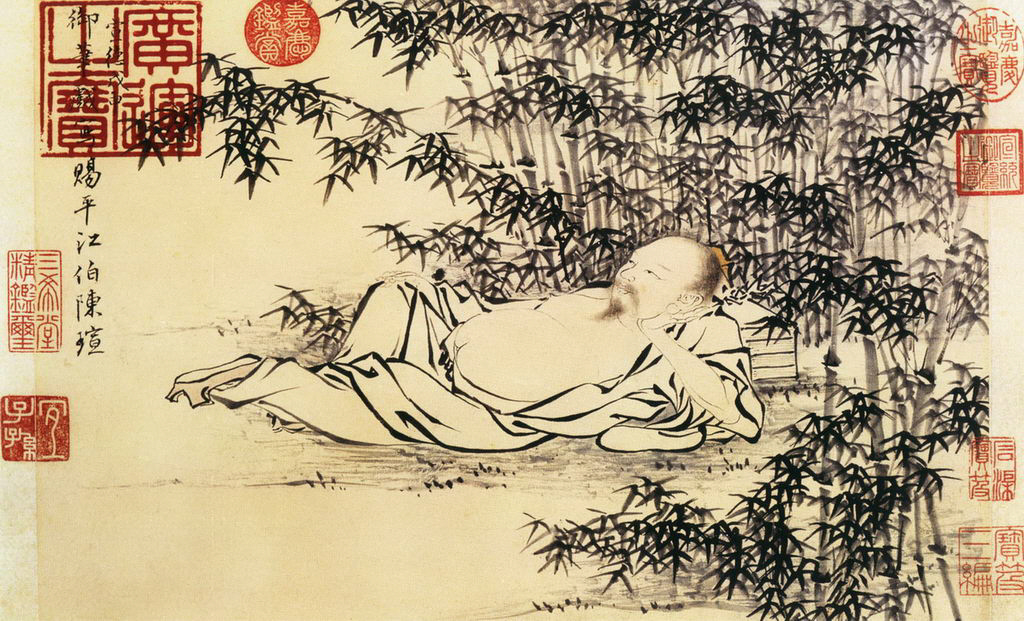
Marquis Wu (Note: Marquis of Wu was the title of Zhuge Liang (181–234), a military leader during the Three Kingdoms period.) in Repose (武侯高臥圖; 1428), The Palace Museum

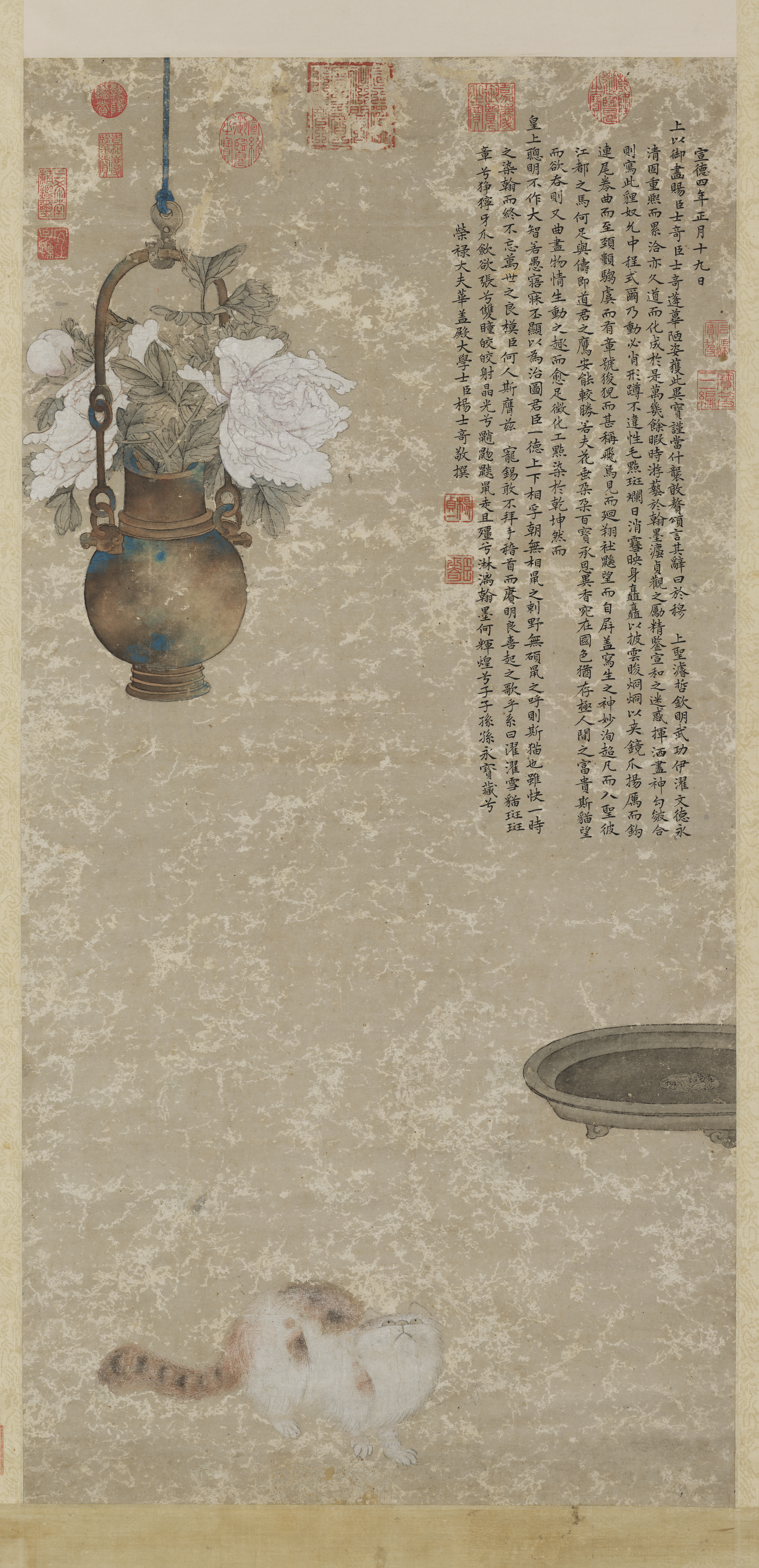
Peonies of Wealth and Prosperity in a Pot (壺中富貴圖; 1429), National Palace Museum

== Death and succession ==
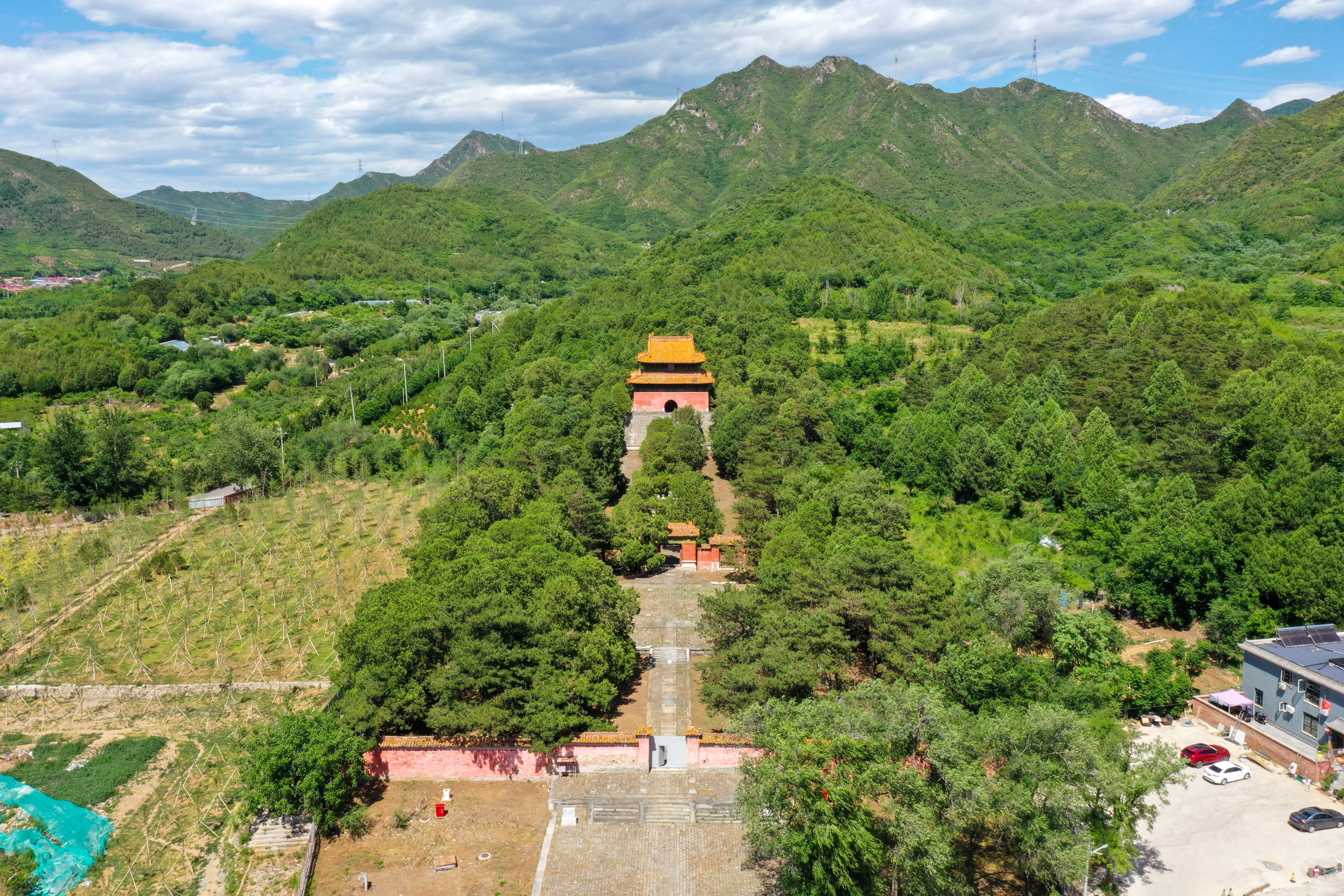
The Jing Mausoleum

In the autumn and winter of 1434, the Emperor led a military detachment on a tour of the northern border, but upon returning to Beijing, he fell ill. He was sick for almost two months and suddenly died on 31 January 1435 in the Palace of Heavenly Purity in the Forbidden City. He was given the posthumous name Emperor Zhang (章帝; 'Distinguished Emperor') and the temple name Xuanzong (宣宗; 'Penetrating Ancestor'). He was buried in the Jing Mausoleum in the Ming tombs near Beijing.

The Xuande Emperor's successor was his elder son, Zhu Qizhen, who had been designated heir to the throne in May 1428. He became emperor at the age of eight, but the rules established by the Hongwu Emperor did not anticipate the accession of a child emperor, making it impossible to appoint a regent to govern the country in place of a minor monarch. The Xuande Emperor decided to have senior officials consult on government matters with the young emperor's grandmother, Grand Empress Dowager Zhang, who became the de facto regent.

== Legacy ==
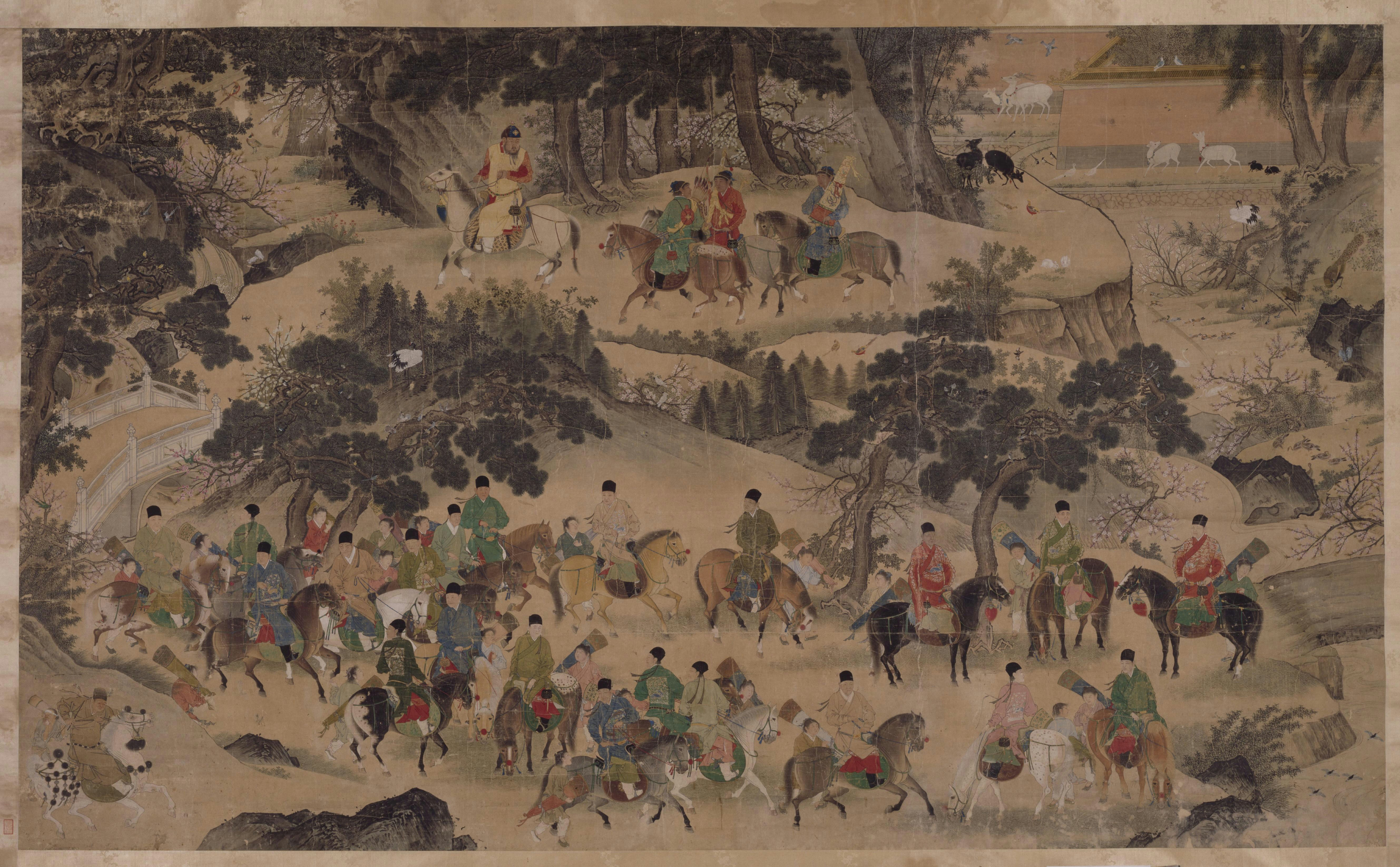
The Ming Emperor Xuanzong Enjoying Himself, by Shang Xi, depicts the Xuande Emperor going on a hunting trip.

Frederick W. Mote described the Xuande Emperor as a capable, active, and skilled ruler. Some civil officials criticized his frequent dispatch of eunuchs to the southern provinces to seek entertainers and virgins for his harem, as well as his increasing reliance on eunuchs and the authority he entrusted to them. He saw himself as a warrior and personally led military campaigns, but his actions were relatively small (such as suppressing his uncle's rebellion) or insignificant (such as clashes with the Mongols on the northern border). According to Edward Dreyer, the Xuande Emperor was the last Ming emperor who was both attentive to his duties as head of state and reasonably impartial in his treatment of the groups that made up the ruling elite. He relied on civil officials, but also frequently utilized eunuchs and military commanders. In contrast, later Ming emperors abandoned their role as stabilizing figures and instead indulged in palace pleasures. Subsequent generations of officials viewed the Xuande era as a golden age of ideal governance, in contrast to the factional conflicts and institutional decay of their own time.

Historians widely regard the Xuande era as the high point of the Ming dynasty, characterized by stability and peace. This was a stark contrast to the harsh administrative purges of the Hongwu era and the civil war of the Jianwen era. Capable and often long-serving ministers and officials, under the leadership of the "Three Yangs" (Yang Shiqi, Yang Rong, and Yang Pu), governed the country with a level of continuity and reliability unique to the Ming era, in accordance with the Confucian ideals of wise ministerial rule led by a capable ruler. The government also made efforts to improve the lives of its people, gave up expansion in Đại Việt, and implemented administrative reforms. While the Emperor may have been harsh towards officials and lenient towards high-ranking officers, this did not significantly impact the overall character of the government.

The rebellion led by the Xuande Emperor's uncle reinforced the Emperor's and his officials' conviction that members of the imperial family should be excluded from military affairs. However, the morale of the Ming army declined during his reign. The consequences of this decline in the army's strength were not fully realized until 1449, at the Battle of Tumu, when the Mongols were able to defeat the Ming army led by Emperor Yingzong and took the Emperor prisoner. The failure of the war in Đại Việt and the subsequent defeat in Tumu were constant arguments used by civil officials against military adventures. During the Xuande era, civil officials took over from military men the leading role in governing the state. Despite significant growth in population and the economy, the Ming military and political institutions remained largely unchanged until the end of the dynasty.

Emperor Xuanzong at Leisure (明宣宗行樂圖)

== Family ==
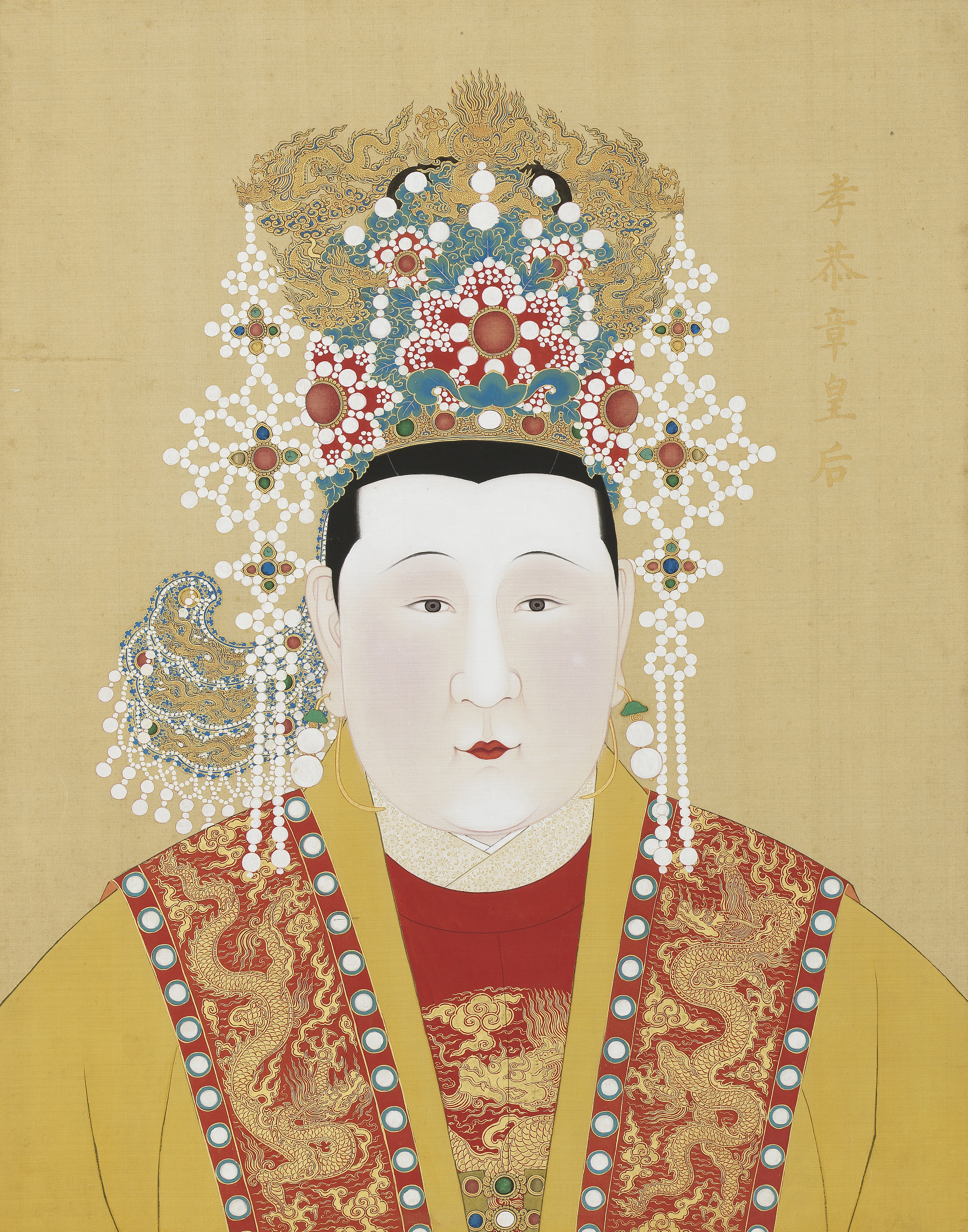
Portrait of Empress Sun, the Xuande Emperor's second empress

The Xuande Emperor had no sons with his first wife, Lady Hu, whom he married in 1417. One of the Emperor's concubines, Lady Sun, bore him a son, Zhu Qizhen, the future Emperor Yingzong. In 1428, the Xuande Emperor deposed Empress Hu and installed Lady Sun as empress. The Emperor's second son, Zhu Qiyu, was born to a concubine surnamed Wu and later ascended the throne as the Jingtai Emperor.

- Empress Gongrangzhang (恭讓章皇后) of the Hu clan (胡氏; 1402–1443), personal name Shanxiang (善祥)
  - Princess Shunde (順德公主), first daughter. Married in 1437 to Shi Jing (石璟; d. 1479).
  - Princess Yongqing (永清公主; d. 1433), second daughter
- Empress Xiaogongzhang (孝恭章皇后) of the Sun clan (孫氏; 1399–1462)
  - Princess Changde (常德公主; d. 1470), third daughter. Married in 1440 to Xue Huan (薛桓).
  - Zhu Qizhen (朱祁鎮), Emperor Yingzong (英宗; 1427–1464), first son
- Consort Rongsixian (榮思賢妃) of the Wu clan (吳氏; 1397–1462)
  - Zhu Qiyu (朱祁鈺), the Jingtai Emperor (景泰帝; 1428–1457), second son
- Noble Consort Duanjing (端靜貴妃) of the He clan (何氏; d. 1435) (Note: She died after the Emperor's death in 1435, in keeping with the practice of having concubines follow the emperor in death.)
- Consort Shu (淑妃) of the Liu clan (劉氏)
- Consort Chunjingxian (純靜賢妃) of the Zhao clan (趙氏; d. 1435)
- Consort Zhenshunhui (貞順惠妃) of the Wu clan (吳氏; d. 1435)
- Consort Zhuangjingshu (莊靜淑妃) of the Jiao clan (焦氏; d. 1435)
- Consort Zhuangshunjing (莊順敬妃) of the Cao clan (曹氏; d. 1435)
- Consort Zhenhuishun (貞惠順妃) of the Xu clan (徐氏; d. 1435)
- Consort Gongdingli (恭定麗妃) of the Yuan clan (袁氏; d. 1435)
- Consort Zhenjinggong (貞靜恭妃) of the Zhu clan (諸氏; d. 1435)
- Consort Gongshunchong (恭順充妃) of the Li clan (李氏; d. 1435)
- Consort Suxicheng (肅僖成妃) of the He clan (何氏; d. 1435)
- Lady Gongshen (恭慎夫人) of the Korean Cheongju Han clan (Note: She was the sister of the Yongle Emperor's Consort Kanghuizhuangshuli.)
- Concubine Zhen'ai (貞哀國嬪) of the Guo clan (郭氏; d. 1428), personal name Ai (愛)

== See also ==
- Chinese emperors family tree (late)

== Notes ==
Xuande Emperor House of Zhu Born: 25 February 1398 Died: 31 January 1435
Regnal titles
Preceded by Hongxi Emperor	Emperor of the Ming dynasty 29 May 1425 – 31 January 1435	Succeeded by Emperor Yingzong (Zhengtong Emperor)
Chinese royalty
Vacant Title last held by Zhu Yunwen	Imperial Grandson-heir of the Ming dynasty 1411–1424	None
Vacant Title last held by Zhu Gaochi	Crown Prince of the Ming dynasty 1 November 1424 – 29 May 1425	Vacant Title next held by Zhu Qizhen
