= Princess Changde =

Ming dynasty princess (1424–1470)

Unknown
- Princess Changde
- Born: 1424
- Died: 1470
- Spouse: Xue Huan
- Father: Emperor Xuanzong
- Mother: Empress Sun

Princess Changde (常德公主; 1424–1470), personal name unknown, was a princess of the Ming dynasty and the third daughter of Emperor Xuanzong. She was his only daughter with Empress Xiaogongzhang of the Sun Clan, thus making her the only full sister of Emperor Yingzong.

== Life ==
Princess Changde was born in the jiachen year of the Yongle era (1424) in Beijing to the then Huang Taisun ('imperial grandson-heir') Zhu Zhanji and his then concubine Sun. Her great-grandfather, the Yongle Emperor, died later the same year and her grandfather became Emperor Hongxi.

On 27 June 1425, when she was 1 year old, her grandfather died and her father became Emperor Xuanzong ⁣and her mother became the Noble Consort Sun. On March 1, 1428, when she was 4 years old, her mother became the Empress Sun. When she was 11 years old her father died and was followed as Emperor by her younger brother, who became the Emperor Yingzong.

In 1436 (the 5th year of the Zhengtong reign), when she was 12 years old, her mother, Empress Dowager Sun, arranged for her to marry Xue Huan, the son of Xue Lu, Marquis of Yangwu, whose Mother was of the Wang clan, after which she was granted the higher title of "Grand Princess". In the same instance her Husband Xue Huan, was appointed to the position of Commandant and granted the rank of fuma. Unfortunately the marriage didn't seem to be a happy one.

On 23 February 1464 — when she was 40 years old—her younger brother, Emperor Yingzong, died, and her nephew, Zhu Jianshen, became Emperor Chenghua. In the dingchou year of the Chenghua era (1477), her nephew, Emperor Chenghua, granted her the title of "Grand Princess Imperial" (大长公主), the highest titles for Ming princess.

During the early reign of Emperor Chenghua, Xue Huan was penalized for missing a court session, leading to a six-month suspension of his official salary. In response, Princess Changde submitted a formal petition to the emperor, explaining that their household had many members and was experiencing financial difficulty. She asked her nephew to reinstate the suspended grain stipend, and the emperor approved her request.

In 1470 (the 6th year of the Chenghua reign), she died at the age of 46. Upon the news of her death, the court was suspended for one day to honor her death, and she was granted a royal funeral and burial in accordance with official regulations.

Her tomb was destroyed long ago. In 1983, a tombstone cover was recovered bearing the inscription "Tombstone of the Grand Princess and Prince Consort Xue Huan."

=== Monogamy scandal ===
The most telling event in Princess Changde's life occurred during her brother's second reign, the Tianshun era (1457–1464). A severe domestic conflict arose when her husband, Xue Huan, "privately took a serving maid" (嘗私侍婢), a euphemism for starting an affair. This led to a heated argument with the princess. Feeling her honor and status had been grievously insulted, Princess Changde did not address the matter through private channels or family intermediaries. Instead, she exercised her ultimate privilege: direct access to the emperor. She went to her brother, Emperor Yingzong, and complained about her husband's infidelity and disrespect.

The emperor ordered the arrest of Xue Huan, charging him with misconduct and subjecting him to public disgrace by having him interrogated by the state judiciary "in the outer court" (法司考訊於外庭). He was sentenced to death by beheading. Following the sentence, he was thrown into the dungeons of the fearsome Jinyiwei, the Imperial Guard (下錦衣衛獄固禁). After a few days of imprisonment, Xue Huan was released.

== Religious endowments ==
Princess Changde donated funds to construct the Hongshan Temple, which was built on a grand scale with complete structures and impressive design. It was located 80 li east of the county, in Dongshaoqu Village, beneath Mount Fenglin, the former site of Longxiang Temple.
