= Shang Xi =

Chinese painter (fl. 1430s)

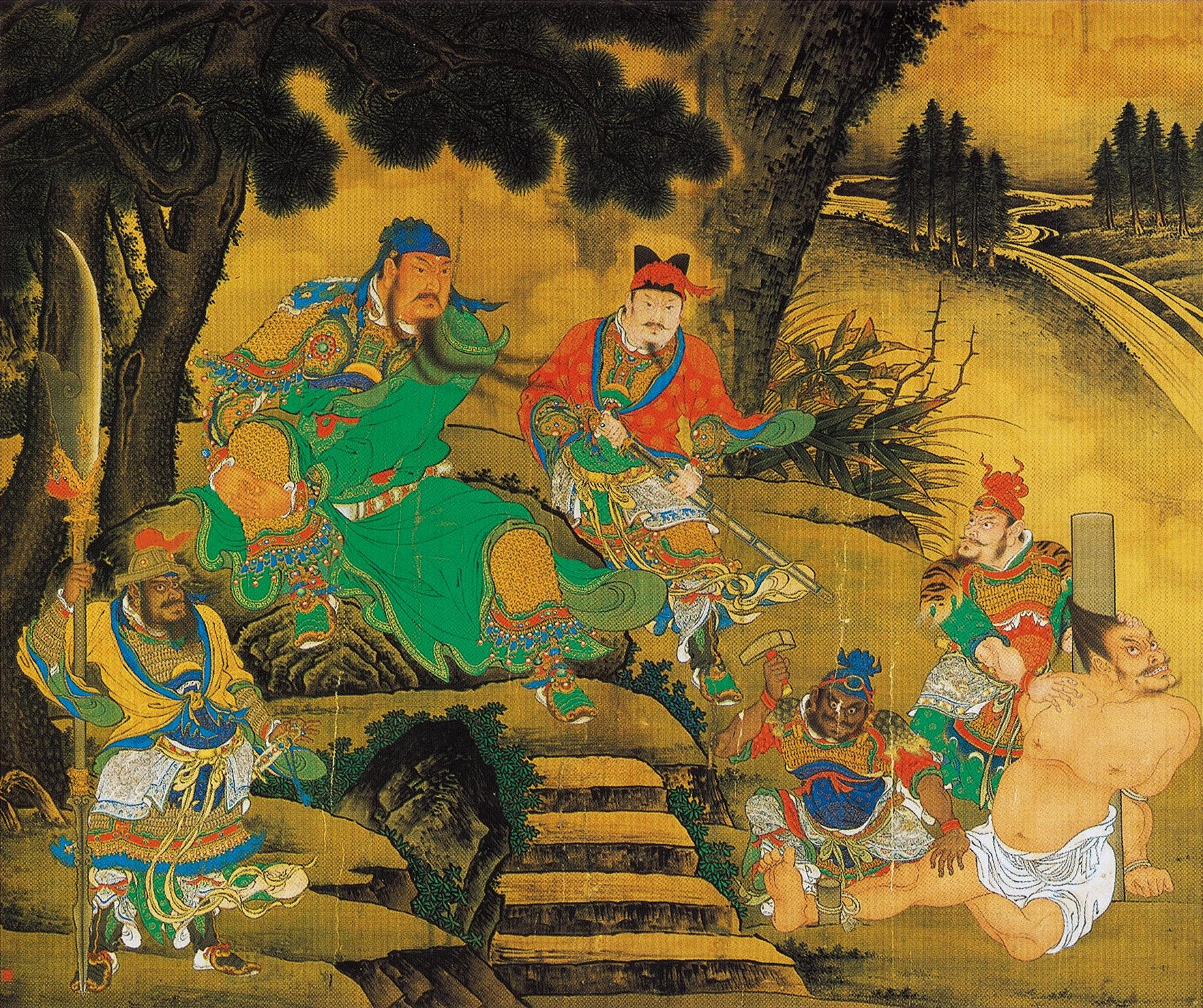
Shang Xi, Guan Yu Capturing His Enemy Pang De, Palace Museum

Shang Xi (Chinese: 商喜; pinyin: Shāng Xǐ; Wade–Giles: Shang Hsi; fl. ca. 1430–1440); was a Chinese mural and scroll painter during the Ming dynasty (1368–1644). His specific birth and death dates are not known.

Shang was born in Puyang in the Henan province. His style name was 'Weiji' (惟吉). He was an imperial court painter who was awarded the title 'Commander of the Imperial Guards'.
