= Wang Zhi (minister) =

Chinese official (1379–1462)

- 王直
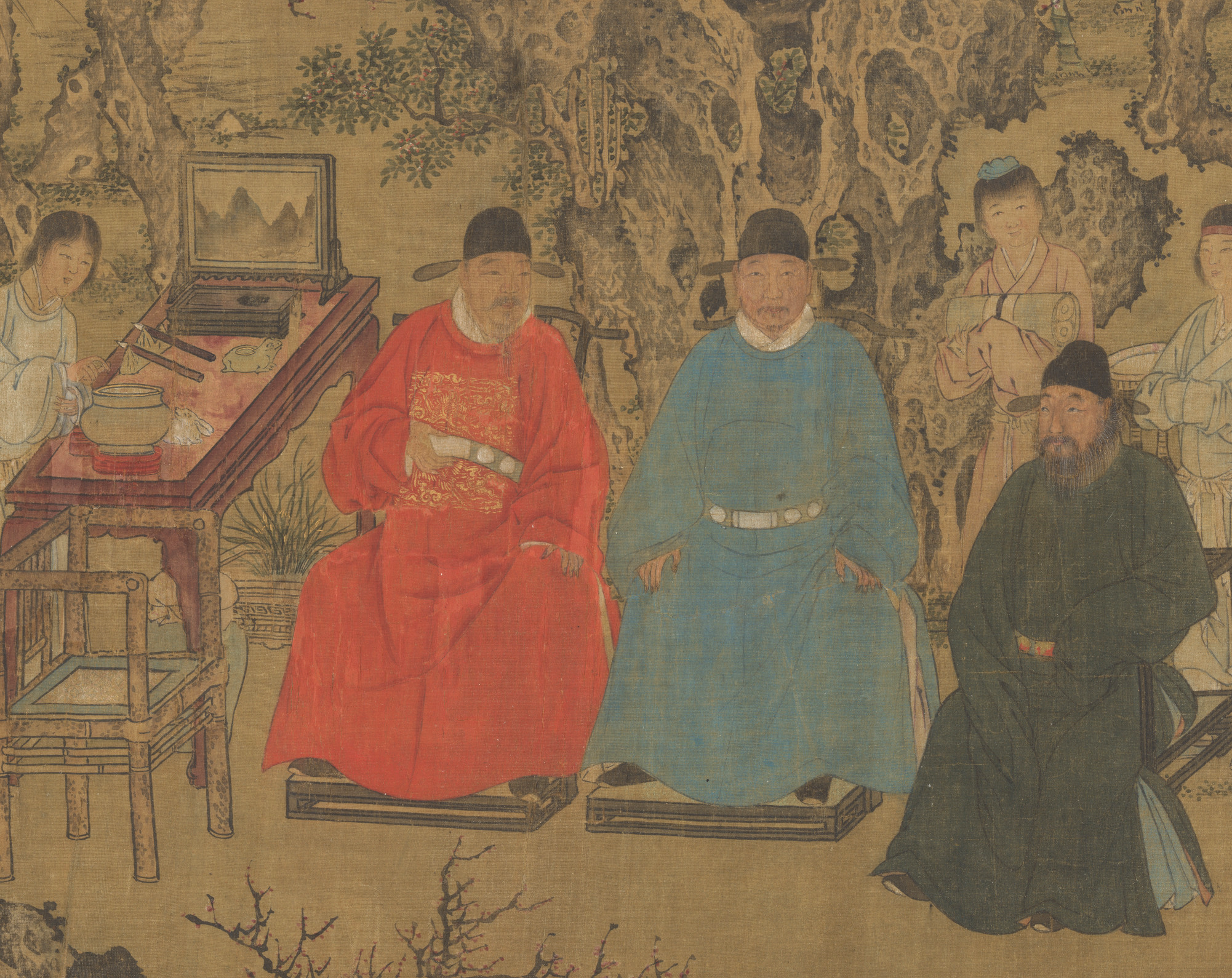
- Portrait of Wang Zhi as depicted in Elegant Gathering in the Apricot Garden by Xie Huan, c. 1437.

Minister of Personnel
- In office 1443–1457 Serving with He Wenyuan (1451–1453) and Wang Ao (from 1453)
- Monarchs: Yingzong; Jingtai
- Preceded by: Guo Jin
- Succeeded by: Wang Ao

Personal details
- Born: 1379
- Died: 15 October 1462 (aged 82–83)
- Education: jinshi degree (1404)

Chinese name
- Chinese: 王直
Transcriptions
Standard Mandarin
- Hanyu Pinyin: Wáng Zhí

Wang Zhi (Note: Wang Zhi used the courtesy name Xingjian (行儉) and the art name Yian (抑菴). He was given the posthumous name Wenduan (文端).) (1379 – 15 October 1462) was a Chinese scholar-official during the Ming dynasty. During the reigns of emperors Yingzong and Jingtai, he served as minister of personnel. He was also among the poets who wrote in the "secretariat style" of poetry.

== Biography ==
Wang Zhi was from Taihe County, Ji'an, in southern China's Jiangxi Province. He received a Confucian education during his youth and excelled in the civil service examinations, ultimately passing the highest level, the palace examination, and achieving the rank of jinshi in 1404.

He then dedicated a significant portion of his career to serving at the Hanlin Academy. In 1438, he was appointed vice minister of rites. Five years later, upon the recommendation of Grand Secretary Yang Shiqi, Wang was appointed by the Emperor Yingzong (r. 1435–1449) to the esteemed position of minister of personnel. In this role, he held the responsibility of appointing and promoting civil servants within the state administration.

Emperor Yingzong became emperor at a young age and his grandmother, Empress Dowager Zhang, held the real power with support from the "Three Yangs"—the grand secretaries Yang Shiqi, Yang Rong, and Yang Pu. After the deaths of the Three Yangs in the early 1440s, the Emperor's trusted eunuch Wang Zhen gained significant influence over the government. Wang Zhi, the highest-ranking minister, became one of Wang Zhen's main opponents. He disagreed with Wang Zhen and the Emperor's decision to personally lead a campaign against the Mongols in 1449, which resulted in the Battle of Tumu, Emperor Yingzong's capture, and the installation of a new emperor, the Jingtai Emperor.

Wang Zhi continued to serve as a minister during the Jingtai era. In 1451, he requested retirement due to old age, but his request was denied. Instead, he was relieved of some of his official duties through the appointment of a co-minister: first He Wenyuan (in office 1451–1453), and then Wang Ao (in office 1453–1467). He finally retired in early 1457, following a coup d’état and the restoration of Emperor Yingzong to the throne. The long overlapping terms of Wang Zhi and Wang Ao, along with their honesty and their ability to recognize the talents of their subordinates, contributed significantly to the continuity and stability of Ming administration in the middle third of the 15th century.

Wang Zhi was also known for his poetry, composed in the secretariat style (taige ti). Together with the Three Yangs and other high officials, such as Jin Youzi and Zeng Qi, he was considered one of the most prominent representatives of the early Ming poetry school.
