= Timeline of the Battle of Tumu =

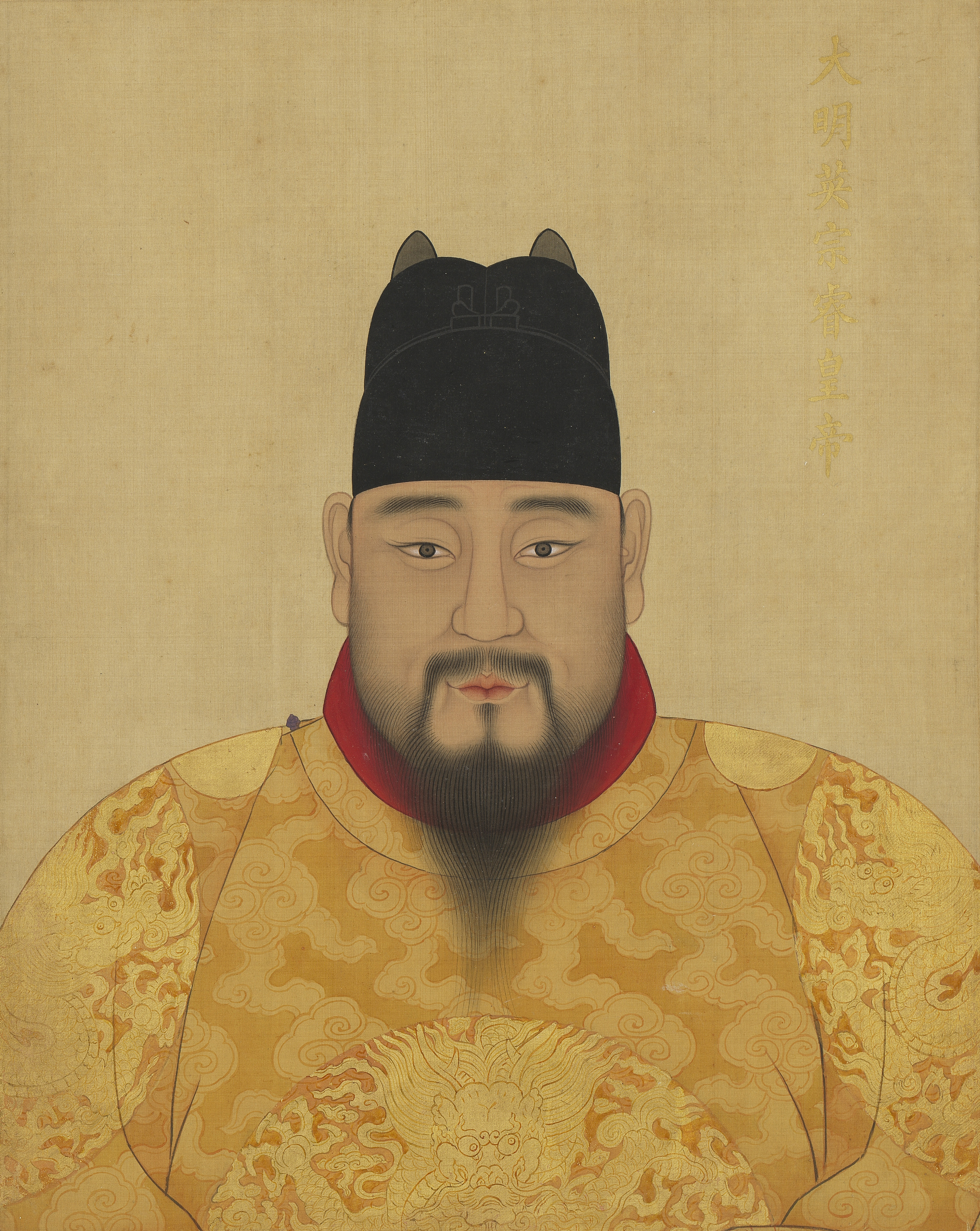
Emperor Yingzong of Ming was captured by the Mongols during the Battle of Tumu.

The Battle of Tumu was a battle in Chinese history, fought on 1 September 1449, between the Ming dynasty and the Oirat Mongols. In July 1449, Esen Taishi, leader of the Oirat Mongols, launched a large-scale, three-pronged invasion of China. Emperor Yingzong of Ming, on the advice of the eunuch Wang Zhen, decided to personally lead an expedition northward to confront Esen, despite protests from experienced generals. The Ming army was ill-prepared and became scattered during its advance. When it reached the Tumu post station, it was in a vulnerable position, trapped in narrow terrain with limited water and supplies. Esen then employed deceptive tactics to lure the Ming forces into an ambush, and Mongol cavalry units quickly surrounded them, cutting off their retreat. Meanwhile, Wang Zhen, who held de facto command, was indecisive and ignored advice from his generals to organize a withdrawal. Esen's troops subsequently overwhelmed and defeated the Ming army, killed tens of thousands of soldiers, and captured the Emperor.

== Chronology ==
=== July 1449 ===
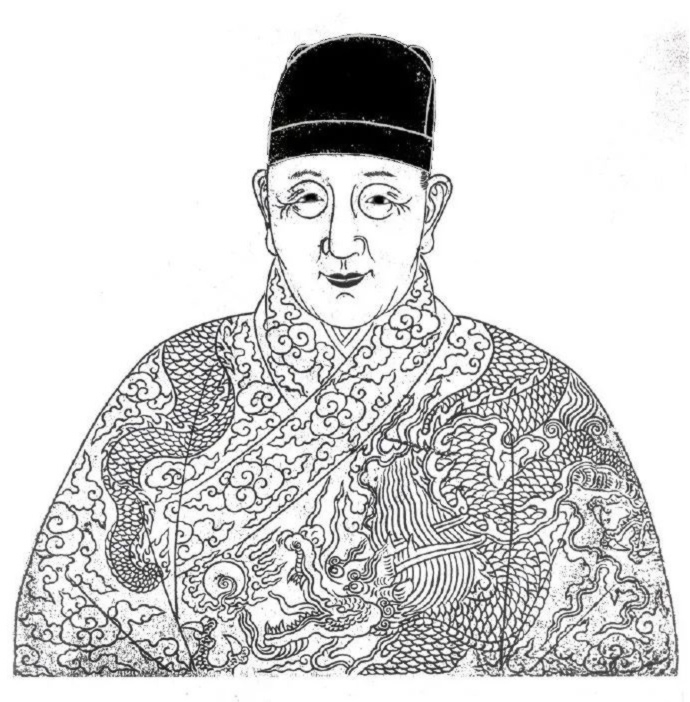
The eunuch Wang Zhen held de facto command of the Ming troops during the battle.

- The ruler of Mongolia, Oirat Mongol leader Esen Taishi, launched a large-scale invasion of Ming China, with the Mongols advancing in three directions. The main objective of this campaign was to capture the fortified cities of Xuanfu and Datong, which would grant the Mongols unrestricted access to the northern regions of China.
- 20 July: News of the invasion reached Beijing, prompting Emperor Yingzong of Ming to order four generals and 45,000 soldiers from the Beijing garrison to advance to Datong and Xuanfu for border protection.
- 30 July:
  - Esen attacked Datong region; the Mongols also attacked several points from the Liaodong Peninsula to Gansu.
  - The Emperor, after being persuaded by the eunuch Wang Zhen, decided to lead the campaign in person to counterattack and punish the Mongols, but officials led by Minister of War Kuang Ye opposed the matter.

=== August 1449 ===
- 2 August: A group of officials, led by the Minister of Personnel, submitted a memorial to protest the Emperor's decision to personally lead the army into battle, but the Emperor's resolve remained unchanged.
- 3 August:
  - The Emperor appointed his younger brother, Zhu Qiyu, as regent and formed a staff of high-ranking officials to accompany him on the campaign.
  - A commander at Xuanfu reported that his cavalry remount post was surrounded and had its water supply cut off by the marauding Mongols.
  - The Ming army suffered a crushing defeat at the hands of the Mongols at Yanghe Pass northeast of Datong, leading to the deaths of two senior field commanders. This defeat occurred after a eunuch representing Wang Zhen, who had forced military commanders to take orders from him, led disgruntled and undisciplined troops into battle; he himself escaped only by hiding in tall grass until the action concluded.

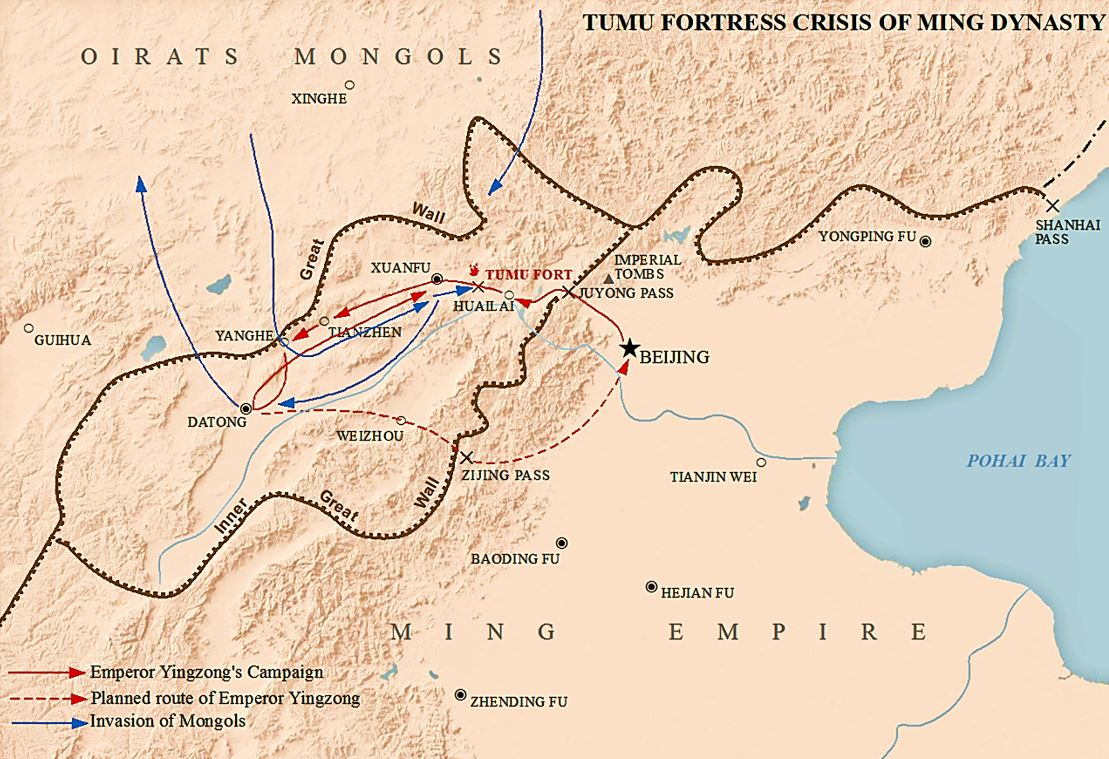
Map showing the Tumu campaign

- 4 August: The Emperor-led army departed Beijing toward the Shanxi border, camping for its first night in Tangjialing.
- 5 August: The Ming army halted for its second night in Longhutai, south of Nankou. However, an alarm during the night led to widespread disorder and confusion among the troops.
- 7 August: The Emperor and his army passed through Juyong Pass and beyond the inner line of the Great Wall, but were constantly beset by rain and storms. Despite requests from officials for a several-day halt, Wang's refusal fostered widespread displeasure and led to a decline in army discipline.
- 8 August: News arrived of an outstanding display of loyalty from the front, which was rewarded through public announcements to bolster officer morale. The army camped at Yulin post station.
- 9 August: The army settled in for the night west of Huailai County.
- 10 August: The army came to a stop for the night at Leijiazhuang.
- 11 August: The army climbed through the steep Qiming Mountain passes. As usual, the Emperor entrusted all power to Wang, who subsequently became increasingly arrogant and abused his power. There were warnings about the dangers ahead, but Wang ignored them and ordered the march to continue.
- 12 August: The Emperor and his army reached Xuanfu, where it was still raining. Growing concern over enemy movements prompted officials to urge Wang to remain in Xuanfu, but he rejected their advice. Some officials and generals even harbored intentions of assassinating Wang and bringing the Emperor back to the capital, though no one had the courage to carry out the plan. As the Ming army advanced, Esen retreated back behind the Wall and waited for an opportunity to ambush.
- 13 August: The army stopped for the night at Wanquanyu.
- 14 August: The army established a temporary camp west of Huai'an County.
- 15 August: The army settled in the west of Tiancheng (present-day Tianzhen County, Shanxi).
- 16 August: The army arrived at the battlefield in Yanghe Pass, where they saw the bodies of soldiers from the previous battle, causing the morale of the soldiers to plummet.
- 17 August: The army reached Chiluo post station, located approximately sixty li from Datong.
- 18 August: The army arrived in Datong.
- 19 August: Wang was initially reluctant to abandon his plan to march into the steppe. However, after a warning from the eunuch commander who had escaped the Battle of Yanghe Pass on 3 August by hiding in tall grass that proceeding would be dangerous and merely lead into Esen's trap, Wang decided to declare the campaign victorious and return to the capital.
- 20 August: The army began its return to Beijing. Initially, Wang intended to take the Zijing Pass route, the shortest path for a swift return to the capital. This route also passed through Yuzhou (present-day Yu County, Hebei), Wang's hometown. After one day's travel, Wang changed his mind, fearing that the army would damage the crops in his native village. He decided to alter the marching direction, choosing the old route back from Xuanfu, which prolonged the journey and caused unease among the soldiers.
- 21 August: The army halted at Dishuiya, located sixty li south west of Yanghe.
- 22 August: The army set up camp at Hongzhou Fangcheng.
- 23 August: The army camped at Baideng.
- 24 August: The army returned to a campsite west of Huai'an County that they had used ten days earlier.
- 25 August: The army stopped for the night at Wanquanyu.
- 26 August: The army established a camp north of the Yanghe River at Shalingbao.
- 27 August: The army stopped at the midpoint of the return route at Xuanfu after a week of foul weather and disorderly marches.
- 28 August: The army set up a temporary camp southeast of Xuanfu.
- 29 August: The army returned to Leijiazhuang, the site of their camp on 10 August.
- 30 August:
  - The rear guard of the Ming army, led by Wu Kezhong and Wu Kejin, who were of Mongol descent, was attacked and wiped out by the Mongols at Liangshan near Xuanfu.
  - A new rear guard of either 30,000, 40,000, or 50,000 cavalry, led by Zhu Yong and Xue Shou, was formed and sent toward Xuanfu. However, this army fell into an ambush in the Yao'er Gorge, about thirty li from where the imperial entourage had stopped, resulting in the complete annihilation of the entire force.
- 31 August: The army reached the Tumu post station. As Esen's army had quickly closed in, leading officials suggested moving to the walled county town of Huailai, only 10.5 km farther on. Wang, however, refused due to his desire to keep the huge imperial baggage with him. The army then set up camp in Tumu, but the incessant rain that had plagued the entire campaign had now ceased, and this place had no water. Esen sent his flanking force to occupy the riverbank south of the Ming camp and block their access to it. The soldiers and horses, without water and food, began to suffer, and the Mongols had completely encircled them.

=== September 1449 ===
- 1 September:
  - After two days without water, the Ming army suffered severely, and their plan to break through to Huailai had failed. The Mongols then offered negotiations. Although the Emperor drafted a peace proposal to send to Esen's camp, Wang ignored it and, without authorization, ordered the army to march toward the river. Chaos ensued, and the Mongols seized the opportunity to launch a full-scale assault. The Ming forces were annihilated, with nearly all high-ranking officials killed. According to some accounts, Wang was later murdered by his own officer.
  - As the Emperor's cavalry guards failed to break through the Mongol encirclement, he dismounted and sat on the ground as storm of arrows killed most of his attendants. He remained unharmed and quietly waited for the outcome of the battle. Mongol soldiers swarmed around him, attempting to seize his rich armor, but he refused to yield it. Just as one warrior raised his sword to kill the Emperor, a Mongol officer intervened. Recognizing the captive's noble bearing, the officer escorted him away.
- 2 September: The Emperor was taken to Leijiazhuang, a post station between Tumu and Xuanfu.
- 3 September: The Emperor was received by Esen in his camp near Xuanfu.

== Aftermath ==
When news of Emperor Yingzong's capture reached Beijing in the middle of the night of 2–3 September, chaos ensued as the city was only left with approximately 100,000 soldiers. Some officials suggested relocating the capital to the south in order to avoid the advancing Mongol army, but Vice Minister of War Yu Qian strongly advocated for defending the capital. In this urgent situation, Empress Dowager Sun made the decision to enthrone Emperor Yingzong's younger brother, Zhu Qiyu, as the Jingtai Emperor, while also honoring Emperor Yingzong as the "emperor emeritus".

On 27 October 1449, the Mongols launched an attack on Beijing. Under the leadership of Yu Qian, the Ming army put up a fierce resistance. After five days of fighting, the Mongols realized they did not have the strength to capture the city and retreated to their homeland. Despite attempts at negotiation, it was not until 1450 that Esen finally released Emperor Yingzong. However, when Emperor Yingzong returned, the Jingtai Emperor placed him under house arrest within the Forbidden City.

Esen faced criticism for failing to capitalize on his triumph at Tumu, and his subsequent friendly relations with the Ming angered Mongol hardliners. In 1453, his proclamation as khan ignited factional strife. In 1455, he was killed by a man named Bukun, whose father he had previously had executed, bringing his short-lived supremacy to an end. In 1457, Emperor Yingzong, taking advantage of his brother's failing health, swiftly regained the throne through a palace coup.
