= Wang Zhi =

Wang Zhi may refer to:

- Wang Zhi (empress) (173 BC – 126 BC), Han dynasty empress and the mother of Emperor Wu
- Wang Zhi (minister) (1379–1462), 15th-century Ming minister
- Wang Zhi (eunuch), late 15th-century Ming court eunuch who ran the Western Depot
- Wang Zhi (pirate), 16th-century Ming dynasty pirate
- Wang Zhi (actress), Chinese actress from Liaoning
- Wang Zhi (fictional), a character in Romance of the Three Kingdoms
