= Ha Ming =

Ming dynasty military officer (died 1503)

Ha Ming (Note: Chinese: 哈铭; pinyin: Hā Míng) (c. 1433 – 3 October 1503), whose name was later changed to Yang Ming, (Note: Simplified Chinese: 杨铭; traditional Chinese: 楊銘; pinyin: Yáng Míng) was a Mongol-born officer of Ming China who served as an interpreter and envoy to Mongolia for nearly fifty years.

Captured by the Oirat Mongols before the Tumu Crisis, Ha Ming later remained with Emperor Yingzong during his captivity on the Mongolian steppe. Serving as an interpreter and intermediary between the Emperor and the Oirat leadership, he accompanied the Emperor throughout his year-long captivity and returned with him to Beijing in 1450. He subsequently rose through the ranks of the Embroidered Uniform Guard, participated in the suppression of rebellions, and undertook diplomatic, military, and frontier assignments in northern China. His writings on the Emperor's captivity constitute one of the principal contemporary accounts of the episode.

== Biography ==
Ha Ming was born c. 1433 during China's Ming dynasty. Little is known about his early life. According to the History of Ming, he was a Mongol. However, his surname Ha, a partial transliteration of "Hajji", suggests that he may have been a Muslim of Uyghur-Mongol origin. His father, Ha Ji (哈只), (Note: In Chinese-language records of the Hui community, those who had completed the pilgrimage to Mecca were known as "Hajjis". Ha Ming's father was therefore called Ha Ji (Hajji), and this title subsequently evolved into the family's surname, Ha.) was a junior officer in the Ming army who commanded both Chinese and Mongol troops. In March 1448, Ha Ji accompanied Wang Xi (王喜), a Korean-born commander in the Embroidered Uniform Guard, on a mission to Esen, leader of the Oirat Mongols. Ha Ming, then still a youth, joined the delegation. The following March, Ha Ming and his father again traveled to Esen's court on a mission led by Wu Liang (吳良; 1376–1474), a Jurchen-born commander in the Guard. This time, Esen detained them, citing grievances that the Ming had previously "seized their envoys, reduced rewards, and curtailed trade". Ha Ming and the other detainees were distributed among various Mongol tribes and compelled to perform labor.

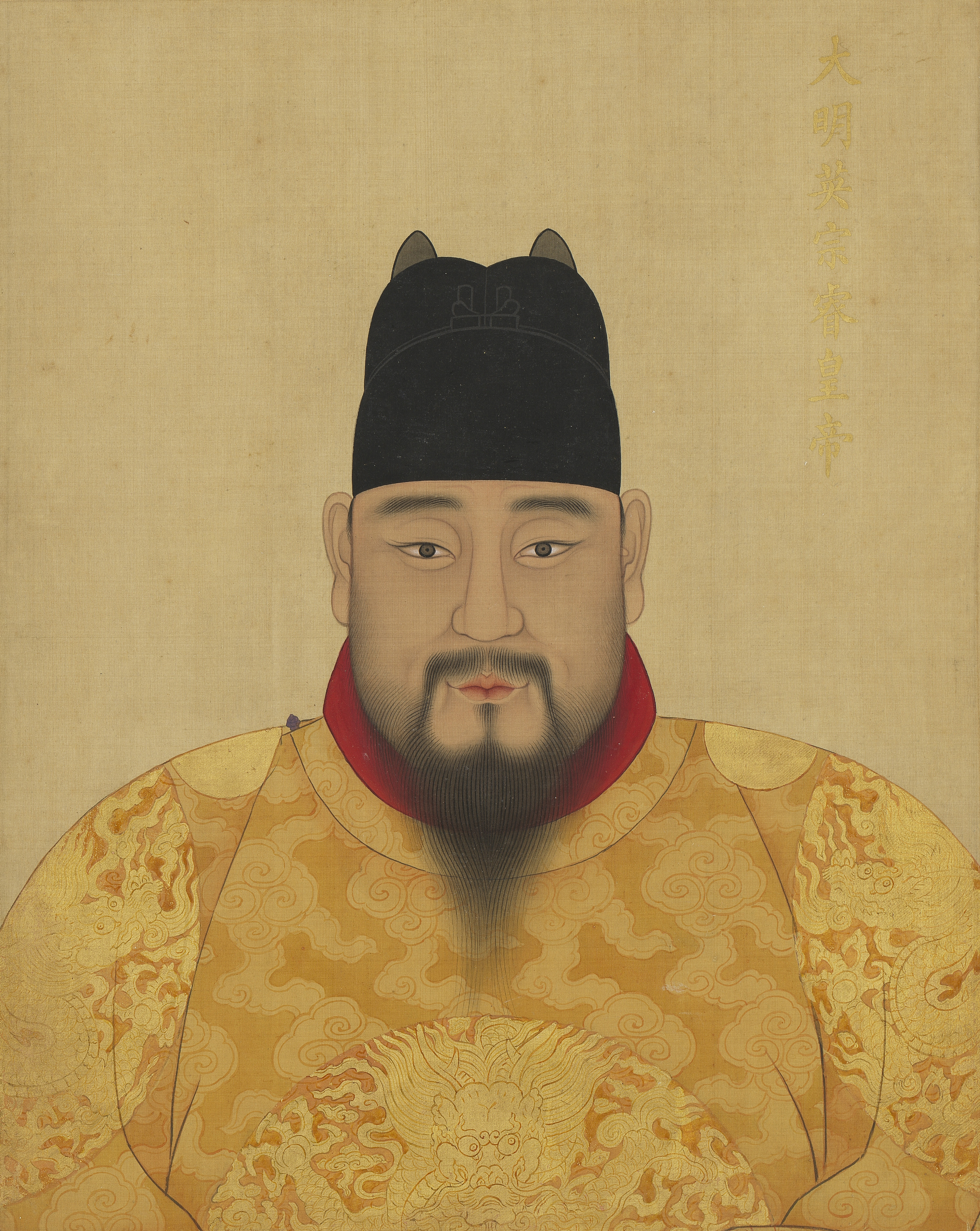
Portrait of Emperor Yingzong of Ming. During his captivity, Ha Ming provided comfort and support in every possible way, often at great personal risk.

In July 1449, the Oirat Mongols under Esen launched a full-scale invasion of China, and Emperor Yingzong (r. 1435–1449) personally led a campaign. The campaign ended in disaster when the Ming army was defeated and the Emperor was captured on 1 September at Tumu post station, an event known as the Tumu Crisis. Ha Ming and his father were allowed to meet the Emperor and remain with him. In October, when Esen brought the captive emperor to the vicinity of Beijing and was refused admittance, Ha Ji entered the city as a messenger and subsequently remained in Ming territory after being promoted to the rank of chiliarch. Ha Ming, however, continued to stay by the Emperor's side. After failing to capture Beijing, Esen withdrew to the Mongolian steppe in November. Throughout the Emperor's captivity, Ha Ming served as his attendant and acted as an interpreter between him and Esen. At the time, only Ha Ming and Yuan Bin (袁彬), the Emperor's personal guard who had been captured alongside him, remained with the Emperor. Their loyalty to and protection of the Emperor aroused Esen's suspicion, while the eunuch Xi Ning (喜寧), who had defected to the Oirats and become Esen's confidant, repeatedly sought to harm both Ha Ming and Yuan Bin.

Upon Emperor Yingzong's return to Beijing in 1450, Ha Ming and Yuan Bin accompanied him and were rewarded by the Jingtai Emperor, who had ascended the throne following Yingzong's capture. Yuan was appointed head of the Embroidered Uniform Guard, while Ha Ming was granted the surname Yang and appointed a constable in the Guard. Seven years later, Emperor Yingzong launched a palace coup and regained the throne (r. 1457–1464). Ha Ming was appointed assistant commander of the Guard and joined a mission to the Oirats under Ma Zheng (馬政). He and Ma Zheng were captured during a Mongol raid in Shaanxi. Ha Ming later escaped with Ma Zheng's son. Upon their return, both men came under suspicion and were investigated, though no punishment was imposed. In March 1459, Ha Ming was demoted to the Guizhou Guard following an incident of unknown nature, but was pardoned shortly thereafter. He later distinguished himself in the suppression of Cao Qin's rebellion in 1461, earning promotion to vice commander of the Guard. He participated in a campaign led by Zhu Yong to suppress Liu Tong's peasant rebellion in 1466 and was subsequently promoted to commander.

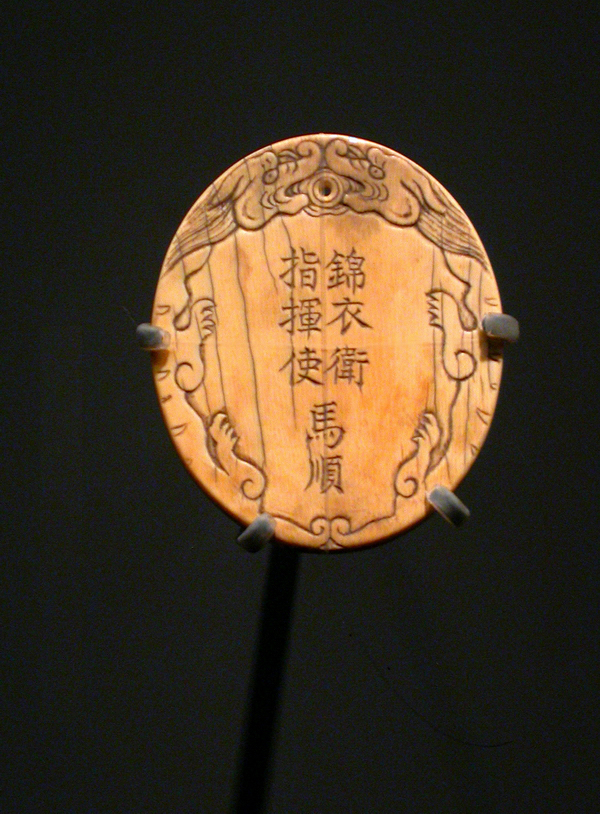
A commander's badge of the Embroidered Uniform Guard, a rank which Ha Ming was granted hereditarily.

In 1471, he was first recorded under the name Yang Ming when he was sent to Datong as an interpreter to receive and investigate a Mongol tribute mission and escort it to Beijing. He subsequently undertook similar assignments on several occasions and was regularly referred to as a grand interpreter from 1478 onward. He also conducted investigations and military assignments in the Uriankhai region and Liaodong. In 1491, the Hongzhi Emperor (r. 1487–1505) granted him a hereditary command rank in the Embroidered Uniform Guard. He remained active in frontier affairs until at least 1500. He died on 3 October 1503. His son, Yang Zong, succeeded him as a commander in the Embroidered Uniform Guard and continued to serve as an interpreter.

Ha Ming was also a writer. He authored two works, Zhengtong beishou shiji (正統北狩事跡) and Zhengtong linrong lu (正統臨戎錄), each in one volume, recording his experiences with Emperor Yingzong during the Emperor's captivity among the Oirats.
