= Wang Jin (eunuch) =

Chinese eunuch (died 1451)

Wang Jin (Note: Chinese: 王瑾; pinyin: Wáng Jǐn; Vietnamese: Vương Cẩn; lit. 'faithful to the royal cause') (died 1451) was a eunuch who served during the reigns of the Ming emperors from the 1410s to the 1450s.

== Biography ==
Born as Chen Wu (Trần Vu) in Đại Việt (present-day northern Vietnam), Wang Jin was captured as a teenager during the Ming invasion in 1407 (or 1408). He was castrated and taken to China as a prisoner of war, where he later served under the Yongle Emperor (r. 1402–1424). Together with his fellow eunuchs Fan Hong, Ruan An, and Ruan Lang, he rose to prominence during the reigns of the Xuande, Yingzong, and Jingtai emperors. During the Xuande Emperor's reign (r. 1425–1435), he participated in various military campaigns, such as suppressing the rebellion of the Emperor's uncle Zhu Gaoxu in 1426, during which he was bestowed the name Wang Jin, and the revolt of the Quxian Guard in the western region in 1430. He was also entrusted with inspecting Zheng He's treasure ships in preparation for the seventh voyage in 1433, as well as upon their return. During the reign of Emperor Yingzong (r. 1435–1449), he took part in the campaign to suppress Deng Maoqi's miners' revolt in Fujian in 1448. At his height of career, Wang Jin received numerous honors and awards, including rare books, jade belts, gold saddles, steeds, gold coins, and other treasures.

In July 1449, the Oirat Mongols under Esen launched a full-scale invasion of China, and Emperor Yingzong personally led a campaign. The campaign ended in disaster when the Ming army was defeated and the Emperor was captured on 1 September at Tumu post station, an event known as the Tumu Crisis. In this turbulent situation, Wang Jin was one of the courtiers who supported the Emperor's younger brother, Zhu Qiyu, ascending the throne as the Jingtai Emperor (r. 1449–1457) in order to stabilize the crisis. In 1450, the Jingtai Emperor sought to depose the heir apparent, the son of the Emperor Yingzong who had been appointed during the 1449 crisis, and replace him with his own son. Wang Jin supported his decision, and when he died during the Jingtai Emperor's reign, he was honored with high posthumous awards, far exceeding those given to any other eunuch of his time.
