= Yang Shiqi =

Chinese official (1364–1444)

- 楊士奇
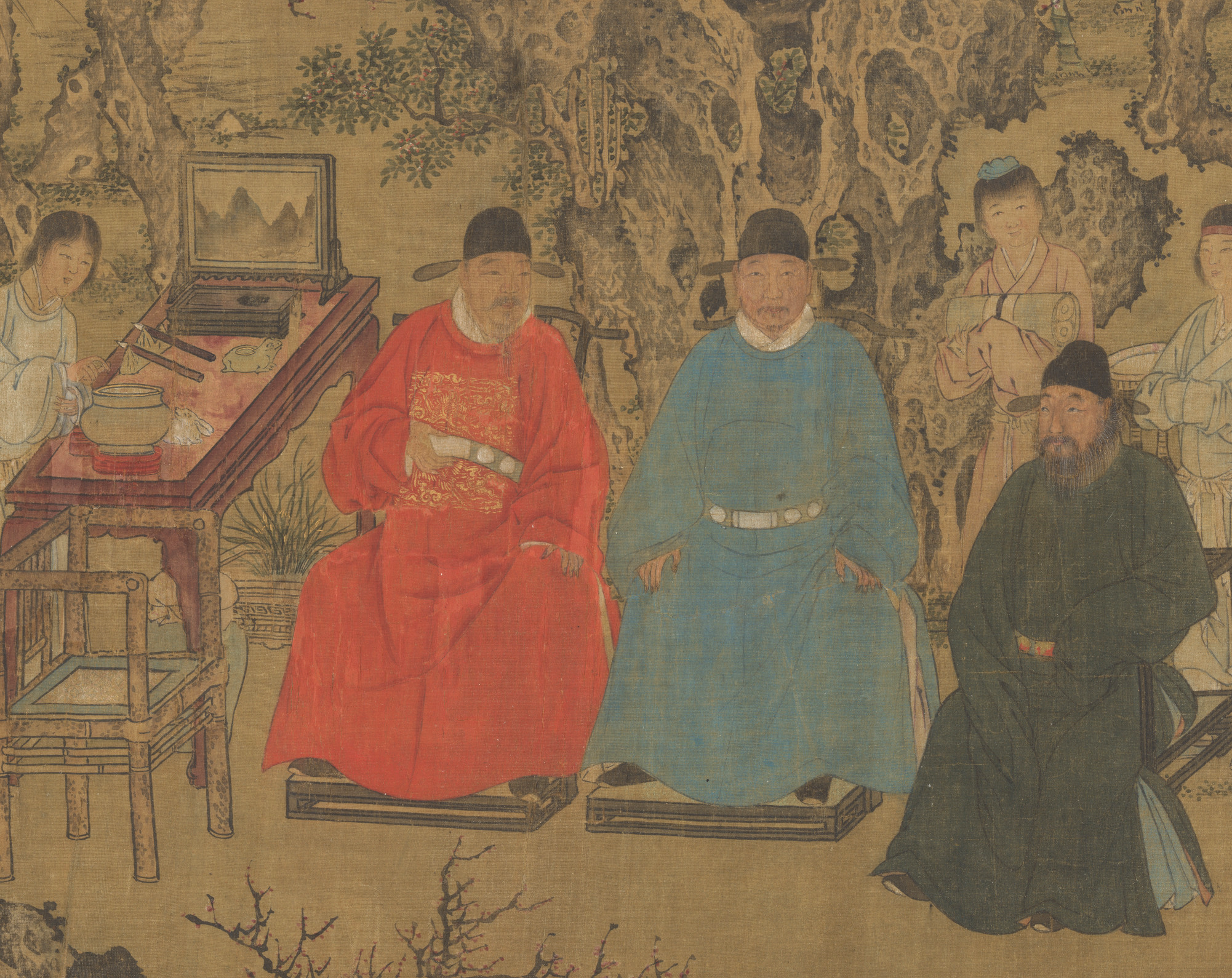
- Portrait of Yang Shiqi as depicted in Elegant Gathering in the Apricot Garden by Xie Huan, c. 1437.

Senior Grand Secretary
- In office 1424–1444
- Monarchs: Hongxi; Xuande; Yingzong
- Preceded by: Yang Rong
- Succeeded by: Yang Pu

Grand Secretary
- In office 1402–1444
- Monarchs: Yongle; Hongxi; Xuande; Yingzong

Personal details
- Born: 1365 Taihe, Jiangxi
- Died: 2 April 1444 (aged 78–79) Taihe, Jiangxi

Chinese name
- Traditional Chinese: 楊士奇
- Simplified Chinese: 杨士奇
Transcriptions
Standard Mandarin
- Hanyu Pinyin: Yáng Shìqí

Yang Shiqi (Note: Yang Shiqi's personal name was Yang Yu (楊寓), while Shiqi was his courtesy name. He also used the art name Dongli (東里) and was given the posthumous name Wenzhen (文貞).) (1365 – 2 April 1444) was a Chinese scholar-official during the Ming dynasty. He served as grand secretary during the reigns of emperors Yongle, Hongxi, Xuande, and Yingzong from 1402 until his death, with a brief hiatus in 1414. In 1424, he became the leader of the corps of grand secretaries, effectively holding the position of informal head of the Chinese government.

== Biography ==
Yang Shiqi was born in China, then under the rule of the Yuan dynasty, in Taihe County, Ji'an, in the southern part of present-day Jiangxi Province. He later became a member of the Hanlin Academy and was one of the young scholars entrusted by the Yongle Emperor of the Ming dynasty with handling his extensive correspondence. Along with six of his colleagues (Huang Huai, Xie Jin, Hu Guang, Yang Rong, Jin Youzi, and Hu Yan), Yang was appointed as a grand secretary. Their duties included reading memorials to the throne and drafting responses, but they did not hold any authority over the state administration. Nevertheless, their significant influence stemmed from their daily interactions with the Emperor and the potential to sway his decisions.

In 1414, the Yongle Emperor launched a campaign against the Mongols and appointed his eldest son and heir apparent, Zhu Gaochi, as regent. Zhu Gaoxu, the younger brother of the heir apparent, attempted to remove him from his role in governing the state. This resulted in a conflict between the two brothers, with Yang Shiqi and Huang Huai siding with the heir apparent. When the Yongle Emperor returned from the campaign, the heir apparent's entourage were accused of arriving late to the welcoming ceremony, and Zhu Gaoxu urged his father to punish them. The Emperor imprisoned several of the heir's advisors, including Yang Shiqi and Huang Huai. Although Yang was eventually able to clear his name and return to his position, Huang remained in prison until the Yongle Emperor's death in 1424. In the same year, Yang Shiqi succeeded Yang Rong as senior grand secretary and held this position until his death.

Yang Shiqi, along with Yang Rong, who died in 1440 after serving as grand secretary for 38 years, and Yang Pu, who held the same position from 1424 to 1446, were seen as the embodiment of government continuity and the stability of the empire in the latter half of the 1420s. They worked closely with the emperors Hongxi and Xuande, with the latter showing great respect for these accomplished statesmen who had served during the reigns of his father and grandfather. After the Xuande Emperor's death, they, along with Empress Dowager Zhang, took charge of the country in place of the underage Emperor Yingzong.

The "Three Yangs" were widely regarded as the most talented poets of their era. They were known for their mastery of the popular taige ti style of poetry, which focused on simple and sometimes monotonous verses that praised the ruler and the prosperity of the nation.
