= Wang Zhi (eunuch) =

Chinese court eunuch of Ming Dynasty

- 汪直
- Born: Guangxi, Ming Empire
- Occupation: Commander of Western Depot

Wang Zhi (Chinese: 汪直; pinyin: Wáng Zhí) was a Chinese court eunuch best known for commanding the Western Depot under the Chenghua Emperor from 1477 to its abolishment in 1483. Although labelled as one of the "four evil eunuchs of the dynasty", Wang Zhi never fully controlled the government like his contemporary Wang Zhen or Liu Jin under the Zhengde Emperor.

== Early life and capture ==
Wang Zhi was a Yao aborigine born in Southwest China and was amongst the several young boys captured and castrated during the military campaigns against the Yao people during the 1460s.

== Rise to power ==
Wang Zhi was initially assigned to the Palace of Auspicious Virtue as a minor attendant to Consort Wan, the favored consort of the Chenghua Emperor (Emperor Xianzong), and his career prospered under her patronage. He later transferred to the Imperial Stables of the Inner Court as a eunuch official, where he gained the emperor's confidence through his service and was assigned espionage and surveillance duties, though he remained outside the traditional eunuch power structure which centered on the Directorate of Ceremonial.

=== The Western Depot ===
In the first month of 1477, Emperor Xianzong established the Western Depot (Xichang), modeled on the existing Eastern Depot (Dongchang), and appointed Wang Zhi as its director. The agency was originally created to deal with Li Zilong, a transvestite who allegedly practiced witchcraft and had infiltrated the palace with the help of a court eunuch, and was housed in a dilapidated old lime factory. Under Wang Zhi's direction, the Western Depot quickly became more feared than the Eastern Depot and exceeded the authority of even the Embroidered Uniform Guard, the emperor's secret police.

Wang Zhi developed an aggressive approach to intelligence gathering, often disguising himself as a civilian and personally searching for suspects accompanied by a dozen imperial guards also in disguise. During his first five months in office, he apprehended Li Zilong, broke up a salt smuggling ring, and restored order in the palace. His intelligence system relied heavily on terror and torture to extract confessions from suspects, and he oversaw the training of officials and spies while forming a powerful faction with Uniform Guard captain Wei Ying as a key confidant. According to the Ming Veritable Records, agents working under Wang Zhi tortured and killed people while claiming to be acting upon the emperor's secret orders.

Wang Zhi's power became so notorious that it was satirized by the court entertainer A Chou, whose comedic style was said to have resembled that of the Han Dynasty advisor and court jester Dongfang Shuo. In one performance, A Chou portrayed a drunk who ignored announcements of both an official's and the emperor's arrival, but immediately stood trembling when told "Eunuch Wang has arrived." When questioned why he feared Wang Zhi more than the emperor, the character replied, "I only know of Eunuch Wang; I know nothing of the Son of Heaven."

In another skit, A Chou portrayed Wang Zhi advancing while carrying "axes and halberds," explaining they represented censors Wang Yue and Chen Yue—officials who had aligned themselves with the eunuch. Grand Censor Wang Yue had befriended Wei Ying during a western campaign and subsequently allied with Wang Zhi, while Right Vice Censor-in-Chief Chen Yue similarly rose to prominence through this connection.

Opposition to Wang Zhi's methods also mounted among high-ranking officials. Grand Secretary Shang Lu, who had placed first at every level of the civil service examinations and was admired for his open-minded and decisive judgement, submitted a memorial stating that ever since Wang Zhi took charge, officials felt insecure in their positions, merchants feared for their safety, and even ordinary people could not focus on their work due to Wang Zhi's highhanded and oppressive surveillance. Minister of War Xiang Zhong also repeatedly criticized Wang Zhi. Emperor Xianzong, who stuttered and tended to avoid officials, reportedly responded: "I merely use a castrato—how would that endanger the world?" The emperor's temperament shaped his handling of Wang Zhi's abuses. Sixteenth-century historian Cheng Xiao described him as balancing magnanimity with control, neither rushing to promote capable officials nor quick to remove problematic ones, preferring instead to manage situations through his own methods. This cautious approach meant he retained confidence in subordinates once appointed while tolerating their excesses longer than critics thought appropriate. Nevertheless, facing persistent criticism from his court, the emperor agreed to suspend the Western Depot's operations.

The suspension proved short-lived. In the summer of 1477, Wang Zhi regained favor and was reinstated, with the Western Depot gaining double the personnel of the Eastern Depot, prompting Grand Secretary Shang Lu to request early retirement.

== Military campaigns ==
In autumn 1479 Emperor Xianzong commissioned Wang Zhi to inspect the empire's garrison strongholds and frontier fortifications. He rode hundreds of li daily with a large retinue, gathering intelligence and sending detailed reports to Beijing while local officials lavishly entertained his party. Two years later, in autumn 1481, he was appointed as an imperial military supervisor to counter a Mongol advance on the northern frontier led by Yisimaler, achieving a victory at Xuanfu for which he was rewarded. That same year, Wang Zhi and General Zhu Yong led a campaign to suppress the Jianzhou Jurchen in what became known as the Second Chenghua Campaign, and the emperor entrusted him with command of the Twelve Garrison Units and ordered him to garrison strategic frontier towns of Datong and Xuanfu.

== Downfall ==
Wang Zhi's influence began to wane after 1481. The emperor kept him away from the court for most of 1482 while the Censorate continued impeaching him for oppressive governance. During his time on the frontier, Datong Governor Guo Tang accused him of discord with General Xu Ning, while a rival eunuch within the Eastern Depot pressed additional charges and offered to serve the emperor more effectively. Finally, in 1483, Emperor Xianzong permanently abolished the Western Depot and demoted Wang Zhi to a menial position in the eunuch guard unit at the founder's tomb in Nanjing. Several of his former associates were stripped of their ranks, but Wang Zhi himself escaped further punishment. Official histories provide no detailed record of his subsequent fate, but is assumed to have died of natural causes.

== In popular culture ==
- In the 2011 film Flying Swords of Dragon Gate (龙门飞甲), Chen Kun portrayed Yu Huatian, the Western Depot commander, a character based on Wang Zhi.
- In the 2011 television series The Emperor's Harem (后宫), Patrick Tam portrayed Wang Zhi.
- In the 2015 television series Medical Shop (医馆笑传), Zhang Yilong portrayed Wang Zhi.
- In the 2020 television series The Sleuth of Ming Dynasty (成化十四年), Liu Yaoyuan portrayed Wang Zhi.
