= Hu Yan (official) =

Chinese official (1361–1443)

- 胡儼
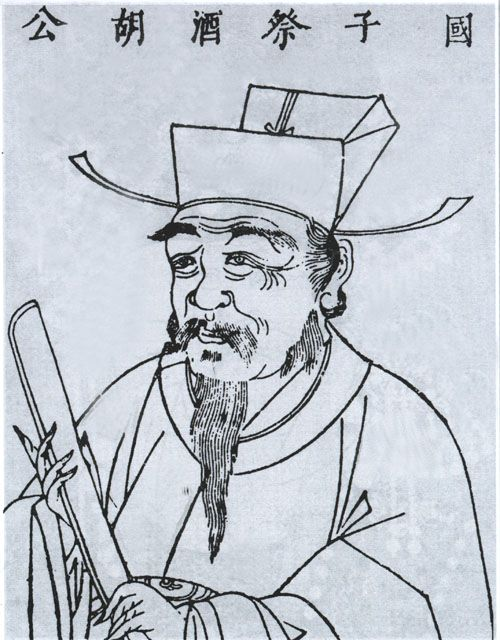
- Portrait of Hu Yan as depicted in the Sancai Tuhui

Chancellor of the Imperial University
- In office 1404–1425
- Monarchs: Yongle; Hongxi
- Preceded by: Xie Jin
- Succeeded by: Yang Rong

Grand Secretary
- In office 1402–1404
- Monarch: Yongle

Personal details
- Born: 1361 Nanchang, Jiangxi
- Died: 20 September 1443 (aged 81–82)
- Education: juren degree (1387)

Chinese name
- Traditional Chinese: 胡儼
- Simplified Chinese: 胡俨
Transcriptions
Standard Mandarin
- Hanyu Pinyin: Hú Yǎn

Hu Yan (Note: Hu Yan used the courtesy name Ruosi (若思) and the art name Yi'an (頤菴).) (1361 – 20 September 1443) was a Chinese scholar-official during the Ming dynasty. He was appointed as grand secretary in 1402 during the reign of te Yongle Emperor and served in this position for two years before being transferred to the head of the Imperial University, where he remained for two decades.

== Biography ==
Hu Yan was born in Nanchang, Jiangxi, China, during the Yuan dynasty. In 1387, during the Ming dynasty, he passed the provincial examination and obtained the juren degree. Although he did not pass the metropolitan examination the following year, he was able to secure a teaching position at a county school. He was appointed as a magistrate in Tongcheng County in 1399 and within three years, he gained recognition from his senior officials. In 1402, the Jianwen Emperor summoned him to the capital, Nanjing, but before he could be officially appointed, the government underwent a change due to the Emperor's loss in a civil war known as the Jingnan campaign.

The new Yongle Emperor was impressed by Hu Yan's extensive education, particularly in the field of astrology, and assigned him to the prestigious Hanlin Academy. In September 1402, he was appointed as one of the seven grand secretaries, serving as the Emperor's personal secretary. In May 1404, he also took on the role of teacher to the heir to the throne. Just a few months later, in October 1404, he was transferred to the position of head of the Imperial University. He was dismissed from the Grand Secretariat due to his colleagues' fear of his directness, openness, and scholarly abilities.

Despite this setback, he remained at the helm of the university for an impressive two decades. As the head of the university, he played a significant role in the government's major literary projects and led the second revision of the Veritable Records of Emperor Taizu. When the capital was relocated to Beijing in 1420–1421, the university also moved there. Hu Yan continued to serve as the head of the university until his retirement in 1425, earning great respect and honor for his long and dedicated service. In fact, he held the longest tenure as head of the university in the three centuries of the Ming dynasty. He was highly regarded as an exceptional teacher and scholar.
