= Yang Pu (Ming dynasty) =

Chinese official (1372–1446)

- 楊溥
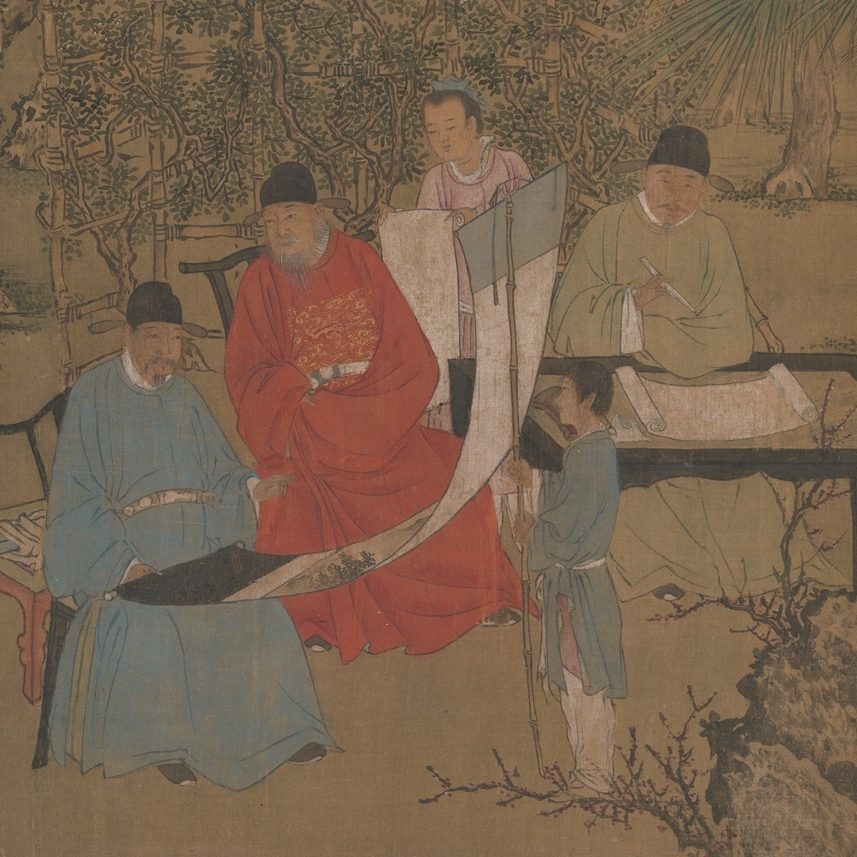
- Portrait of Yang Pu as depicted in Elegant Gathering in the Apricot Garden by Xie Huan, c. 1437.

Senior Grand Secretary
- In office 1444–1446
- Monarch: Yingzong
- Preceded by: Yang Shiqi
- Succeeded by: Cao Nai

Grand Secretary
- In office 1424–1446
- Monarchs: Xuande; Yingzong

Personal details
- Born: 1372 Shishou, Hubei
- Died: 6 August 1446 (aged 73–74) Jingshi
- Education: jinshi degree (1400)

Chinese name
- Traditional Chinese: 楊溥
- Simplified Chinese: 杨溥
Transcriptions
Standard Mandarin
- Hanyu Pinyin: Yáng Pǔ

Yang Pu (Note: Yang Pu's courtesy name was Hongji (弘濟), and he was given the posthumous name Wending (文定).) (1372 – 6 August 1446) was a Chinese scholar-official during the Ming dynasty. He was appointed as the grand secretary in 1424, at the beginning of the Hongxi Emperor's reign, and held the position until his death. In his final two years, he served as the senior grand secretary.

== Biography ==
Yang Pu was born during the Ming dynasty in southern China, in present-day Shishou County, Jingzhou, Hubei. He achieved the highest level of success in the official examinations, known as the palace examination, and was granted the rank of jinshi in 1400. After this accomplishment, he served at the Hanlin Academy.

Along with Huang Huai, Yang Shiqi, and Yang Rong, he was part of the inner circle of the heir apparent, Zhu Gaochi. In September 1414, after the Yongle Emperor's return from a campaign in Mongolia, Zhu Gaoxu accused his elder brother, Zhu Gaochi, of neglecting his duties. The Emperor punished the heir's advisors, including grand secretaries Huang Huai and Yang Shiqi, as well as Yang Pu, who was removed from his position and imprisoned.

After Zhu Gaochi ascended to the throne as the Hongxi Emperor, Yang Pu was released and appointed as grand secretary on 9 September 1424. He held this position until his death, serving as one of the "Three Yangs" (along with Yang Shiqi and Yang Rong). This trio of highly experienced, capable, and influential officials governed the Ming dynasty from the late 1420s under the leadership of the Hongxi Emperor's eldest son and successor, the Xuande Emperor. After the Xuande Emperor's death in 1435, "Three Yangs" continued to serve alongside Empress Dowager Zhang, the widow of the Hongxi Emperor and mother of the Xuande Emperor, as well as leading eunuchs. In 1444, following the death of Yang Shiqi, Yang Pu assumed his role as senior grand secretary.

The Three Yangs were also renowned poets of their time, writing in the popular style of taige ti (secretariat style). Their poems were simple and monotonous, reflecting the shared values of the official class and praising the able government and monarch for the country's prosperity.
