= Achou =

Chinese palace huanguan (eunuch)

Achou (Chinese: 阿丑; pinyin: Āchǒu) was a Chinese palace huanguan (eunuch) of the Ming dynasty who often acted in fumo (副末 or 付末; jester) roles in yuanben to entertain (and influence) the Chenghua Emperor (reigned 1464–1487).

One day, Achou created a skit for the emperor in which he portrayed a drunkard. In this performance, when he was told that a certain government official was coming, the drunkard remained drunk and acted wild and rowdy. Next, he heard a warning that the emperor was here, but he continued his frolicking. Finally, a warning came that the head eunuch Wang Zhi had arrived, and the drunkard immediately became quiet. When asked about his behavior, he said he only knew of Wang Zhi's power but not of the emperor's. With this performance, Achou warned the Chenghua Emperor that Wang Zhi was becoming too influential in politics, at his expense.

Wang Zhi was supported by the generals Wang Yue and Chen Yue. During another performance, Achou carried two yue (halberds), one in each hand. When asked what these were, he joked they were yue's, named Chen Yue and Wang Yue! Achou was able to remonstrate the emperor this way because the emperor still trusted another head eunuch and Wang Zhi's rival, Huai'en.

On another occasion, Achou exposed the corruption of Zhu Yong, the Duke of Baoguo, with a skit in which he played a Confucian scholar. When he recited a well-known poem "Wu River" (烏江) by the Tang-dynasty poet Hu Zeng about Xiang Yu, he changed "eight thousand soldiers" in a verse to "six thousand soldiers". When he was corrected, he replied that the missing two thousand had gone to build a mansion for the Duke of Baoguo. At that time, Zhu Yong was the garrison commander of the capital who was known to use his soldiers for his personal use. The emperor was alerted, but still doubtful, he asked the eunuch Shang Ming (尚明) to investigate. Zhu Yong was scared and stopped the construction.
