= Fan Hong =

Chinese eunuch (died 1449)

Fan Hong (Chinese: 范弘; pinyin: Fàn Hóng; Vietnamese: Phạm Hoằng; died 1449) was a eunuch who served during the reigns of the Ming emperors from the 1410s to the 1440s.

== Biography ==
Born as Fan An (Phạm An) in Đại Việt (present-day northern Vietnam), Fan Hong was captured, castrated, and taken to China, where he served under the Yongle Emperor (r. 1402–1424), during the Ming invasion of the country in 1407. Together with his fellow eunuchs Jin Ying, Ruan An, and Ruan Lang, he rose to prominence during the reigns of the reigns of the Xuande Emperor (r. 1425–1435) and Emperor Yingzong (r. 1435–1449). He was known for his higher education and was appointed to the Directorate of Ceremonial during the reign of the Emperor Yingzong. However, his activities are not well recorded. In July 1449, the Oirat Mongols under Esen launched a full-scale invasion of China, and Emperor Yingzong personally led a campaign. The campaign ended in disaster when the Ming army was defeated and the Emperor was captured on 1 September at Tumu post station, an event known as the Tumu Crisis. Among the casualties was Fan Hong.
