= Yang Rong (mandarin) =

Chinese official (1371–1440)

- 楊榮
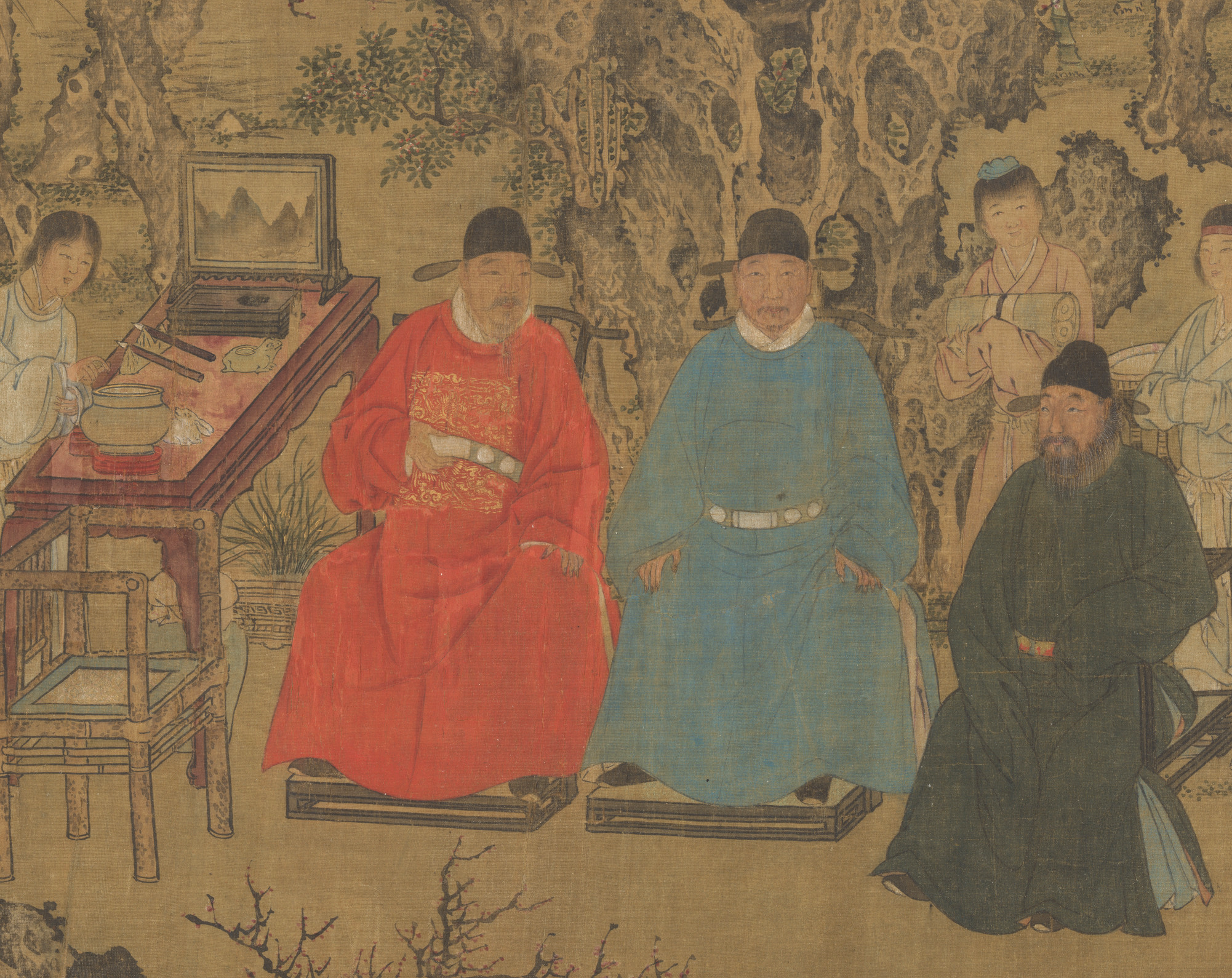
- Portrait of Yang Rong as depicted in Elegant Gathering in the Apricot Garden by Xie Huan, c. 1437.

Senior Grand Secretary
- In office 1418–1424
- Monarch: Yongle
- Preceded by: Hu Guang
- Succeeded by: Yang Shiqi

Grand Secretary
- In office 1402–1440
- Monarchs: Yongle; Hongxi; Xuande; Yingzong

Personal details
- Born: 1371 Jian'ou, Fujian
- Died: 1440 (aged 68–69) Beijing
- Education: jinshi degree (1400)

Chinese name
- Traditional Chinese: 楊榮
- Simplified Chinese: 杨荣
Transcriptions
Standard Mandarin
- Hanyu Pinyin: Yáng Róng

Yang Rong (Note: Yang Rong's birth name was Yang Ziyong (楊子榮). He used the courtesy name Mianren (勉仁) and the art name Dongyang (東楊), and was given the posthumous name Wenmin (文敏).) (1371–1440) was a Chinese scholar-official during the Ming dynasty. He was appointed as grand secretary in 1402 by the Yongle Emperor and held this position until his death. From 1418 to 1424, he served as senior grand secretary. He was known for his role in maintaining the stability of the government and the empire during the first half of the 15th century.

== Biography ==
Born in 1371 during China's Ming dynasty, Yang Rong was from Jian'an County (present-day Jian'ou), Fujian. He passed the palace examination, the highest level of civil service examinations, and received the rank of jinshi in 1400. He then served at the Hanlin Academy. In September 1402, the Yongle Emperor appointed him as his grand secretary, making him one of the Emperor's closest assistants. After the death of Hu Guang in 1418, Yang Rong became the head of the grand secretaries and served as senior grand secretary. Following the death of the Yongle Emperor, he handed over the position of senior grand secretary to Yang Shiqi. However, he remained a grand secretary until his death and was known as one of the "Three Yangs" (along with Yang Pu). From the second half of the 1420s, they jointly administered the Ming dynasty with the Xuande Emperor and, after his death in 1435, with Empress Dowager Zhang.

As a politician, Yang Rong was known for his cunning nature, in contrast to the straightforward Yang Shiqi. Despite this, he was also considered a decisive and trustworthy advisor to the emperors. He advocated for a moderate policy, as seen when the local authorities of Zhejiang requested a military campaign against rebels hiding in the mountains. Yang Rong argued that these rebels were simply poor and displaced individuals who needed appeasement, rather than violence. In the late 1420s, he was one of the politicians who urged for a withdrawal from occupied Đại Việt (present-day northern Vietnam). During the Zhu Gaoxu rebellion, he demonstrated his decisiveness by pushing for quick and energetic action from the imperial troops.

Yang Rong, along with his colleagues Yang Shiqi and Yang Pu, was a highly influential poet during his time. They were known for their contributions to the popular style of taige ti (secretariat style), which consisted of simple and sometimes monotonous poems that praised the accomplishments of the monarch and the progress of the country. His family published his collected works, titled Yang Wenmingong ji (楊文敏公集), in 25 juan.
