= Emperor Yingzong of Ming =

Emperor of China (1435–1449, 1457–1464)

Emperor Yingzong of Ming 明英宗
- Palace portrait on a hanging scroll

Emperor of the Ming dynasty
- First reign: 31 January 1435 – 22 September 1449
- Enthronement: 7 February 1435
- Predecessor: Xuande Emperor
- Successor: Jingtai Emperor
- Regents: See list: Grand Empress Dowager Zhang (1435–1442) Yang Shiqi (1435–1442) Yang Rong (1435–1440) Yang Pu (1435–1442) Zhang Fu (1435–1442)
- Second reign: 11 February 1457 – 23 February 1464
- Predecessor: Jingtai Emperor
- Successor: Chenghua Emperor
- Born: 29 November 1427
- Died: 23 February 1464 (aged 36)
- Burial: Yu Mausoleum, Ming tombs, Beijing
- Consorts: Empress Xiaozhuangrui (m. 1442) Empress Xiaosu (before 1464)
- Issue Detail: Chenghua Emperor; Zhu Jianjun, Prince Jian of Ji
Era dates
- Zhengtong: (Note: Simplified Chinese: 正统; traditional Chinese: 正統; pinyin: Zhèngtǒng) 18 January 1436 – 13 January 1450; Tianshun: (Note: Simplified Chinese: 天顺; traditional Chinese: 天順; pinyin: Tiānshùn) 11 February 1457 – 26 January 1465
Posthumous name
- Emperor Fatian Lidao Renming Chengjing Zhaowen Xianwu Zhide Guangxiao Rui (Note: Simplified Chinese: 法天立道仁明诚敬昭文宪武至德广孝睿皇帝; traditional Chinese: 法天立道仁明誠敬昭文憲武至德廣孝睿皇帝 (conferred by the Chenghua Emperor in 1464))
Temple name
- Yingzong
- House: Zhu
- Dynasty: Ming
- Father: Xuande Emperor
- Mother: Empress Sun

Chinese name
- Chinese: 明英宗
Transcriptions
Standard Mandarin
- Hanyu Pinyin: Míng Yīngzōng
- Wade–Giles: Ming^{2} Ying^{1}-tsung^{1}
- IPA: [mǐŋ íŋ.tsʊ́ŋ]

Zhengtong Emperor
- Traditional Chinese: 正統帝
- Simplified Chinese: 正统帝
Transcriptions
Standard Mandarin
- Hanyu Pinyin: Zhèngtǒng Dì
- Wade–Giles: Chêng^{4}-tʻung^{3} Ti^{4}
- IPA: [ʈʂə̂ŋ.tʰʊ̀ŋ tî]

Tianshun Emperor
- Traditional Chinese: 天順帝
- Simplified Chinese: 天顺帝
Transcriptions
Standard Mandarin
- Hanyu Pinyin: Tiānshùn Dì
- Wade–Giles: Tʻien^{1}-shun^{4} Ti^{4}
- IPA: [tʰjɛ́n.ʂwə̂n tî]

Emperor Yingzong of Ming (29 November 1427 – 23 February 1464), personal name Zhu Qizhen, (Note: Simplified Chinese: 朱祁镇; traditional Chinese: 朱祁鎮; pinyin: Zhū Qízhèn) was the sixth and eighth emperor of the Ming dynasty of China. He ruled as the Zhengtong Emperor from 1435 to 1449, and as the Tianshun Emperor from 1457 to 1464.

Emperor Yingzong was the eldest son and successor of the Xuande Emperor. After ascending the throne, he adopted the era name Zhengtong, which means "right governance". During his first reign, the empire was at its height of prosperity and power. As the first child emperor of the Ming dynasty, his rule was heavily influenced by high dignitaries at court. Initially, his grandmother, Grand Empress Dowager Zhang, along with the "Three Yangs" (Yang Shiqi, Yang Rong, and Yang Pu), held the highest positions of power. However, after his grandmother died in 1442, the Emperor began to listen more to the eunuch Wang Zhen.

In 1449, at Wang Zhen's suggestion, Emperor Yingzong personally led the army against the Mongol army of Esen Taishi, but at the Battle of Tumu Fortress, Esen's army defeated the Ming army and captured the Emperor. This event shocked the government and the country, leading the court to elevate Emperor Yingzong's brother, Zhu Qiyu, to the throne as the Jingtai Emperor. During his captivity, Emperor Yingzong established good relations with Esen and was eventually released in 1450.

After Emperor Yingzong returned to his homeland, the Jingtai Emperor felt threatened and ordered him to stay in the Southern Palace within the Forbidden City. He also restricted Emperor Yingzong's contact with the outside world. After the Jingtai Emperor fell ill in early 1457, Emperor Yingzong regained power after dethroning his brother in a palace coup. The era name of his second reign was Tianshun, which means "obedience to Heaven". The following month, the Jingtai Emperor died. Emperor Yingzong ruled for another seven years before his death in 1464. His eldest son, the Chenghua Emperor, then ascended to the imperial throne.

== Early life and accession ==
Zhu Qizhen, the future Emperor Yingzong, was born on 29 November 1427 as the elder of the two sons of the Xuande Emperor, the fifth emperor of China's Ming dynasty. The Emperor was overjoyed by his son's birth and showed him love and affection. Zhu Qizhen's mother, Lady Sun, was one of the Emperor's concubines. The Xuande Emperor designated him heir to the throne on 20 February 1428, and promoted Lady Sun to empress in March of the same year. He also ensured that Zhu Qizhen received proper military training. In 1433, the Ministry of War assembled a detachment of 7,112 physically fit 11–12-year-old youths, as ordered by the Emperor, and the prince was appointed as their commander. According to historian Fang Chao-ying, Zhu Qizhen began his education with his teacher, who was likely the court eunuch and former pedagogue Wang Zhen.

The Xuande Emperor died on 31 January 1435 after a brief illness. Zhu Qizhen was only eight years old, prompting a proposal to place his father's younger brother Zhu Zhanshan, Prince of Xiang, on the throne. The 17th-century Chinese historian Mao Qiling claims that the late emperor's mother, Empress Dowager Zhang, supported Zhu Zhanshan. Empress Sun quickly intervened and prevented Zhu Zhanshan's ascension, resulting in Zhu Qizhen being crowned as the new emperor. Despite this, Lady Zhang still held significant influence in the government.

In contrast, the editors of the History of Ming, the official history of the Ming dynasty completed in 1739, portrayed Empress Dowager Zhang as a supporter of Zhu Qizhen's rights. According to their version, she summoned the grand secretaries—Yang Shiqi, Yang Rong, and Yang Pu, known as the "Three Yangs"—and emphasized that Zhu Qizhen was now emperor. Thereupon, the grand secretaries expressed their allegiance to the young prince, followed by the entire court.

== Regency of Grand Empress Dowager Zhang ==
Emperor Yingzong's ascension to the throne was in accordance with the rules of the Ming dynasty, as he was the eldest son of the deceased emperor. However, the laws established by the founder of the dynasty, the Hongwu Emperor, enshrined a system of government in which a strong and decisive monarch was expected to make decisions independently, with the advice of ministers. This system did not account for the scenario of a child ruler, leaving no provisions or precedents for how to handle the situation. At court, the most respected and highest-ranking individual was Grand Empress Dowager Zhang, who effectively became the regent. Empress Dowager Sun was also occasionally consulted, but she held a lower status than her mother-in-law.

Lady Zhang was the leader of the council, which consisted of the three grand secretaries and three eunuchs. The Three Yangs had served as grand secretaries for many years, with Yang Pu serving since 1424 and the other two since 1402. They were highly skilled, influential, and respected. The eunuchs, Wang Jin, Fan Hong, and Jin Ying, were in charge of the Directorate of Ceremonial, the most powerful office in the Imperial Palace. They had all held their positions under the previous reign. The Grand Empress Dowager acted as a mediator between the grand secretaries and the head eunuchs. The Emperor's exclusion from decision-making was considered illegal, but it allowed for the successful rule of experienced statesmen, particularly the Three Yangs. This period of political stability was later seen as a golden age by future generations.

Wang Zhen served as the teacher, tutor, and confidant of the Emperor. He was from the northern Chinese province of Shanxi, like Lady Zhang, and was significantly younger than the other members of the Imperial Council, being in his thirties. It soon became clear that the Emperor had full confidence in him, which led to a rise in his influence and compelled the grand secretaries to take his views into account. Lady Zhang viewed Wang Zhen's influence on the Emperor as dangerous and attempted to restrict him, even going so far as to order him to commit suicide in 1437. However, the Emperor, with the support of some officials, managed to prevent the order from being carried out.

The political landscape underwent significant changes in the early 1440s. In 1440, Grand Secretary Yang Rong died at the age of sixty-nine. On 8 June 1442, the Emperor married Lady Qian, and on 18 November 1442, just eleven days before his fifteenth birthday, he assumed control of the government. Two days later, Grand Empress Dowager Zhang died.

== Domination of Wang Zhen ==
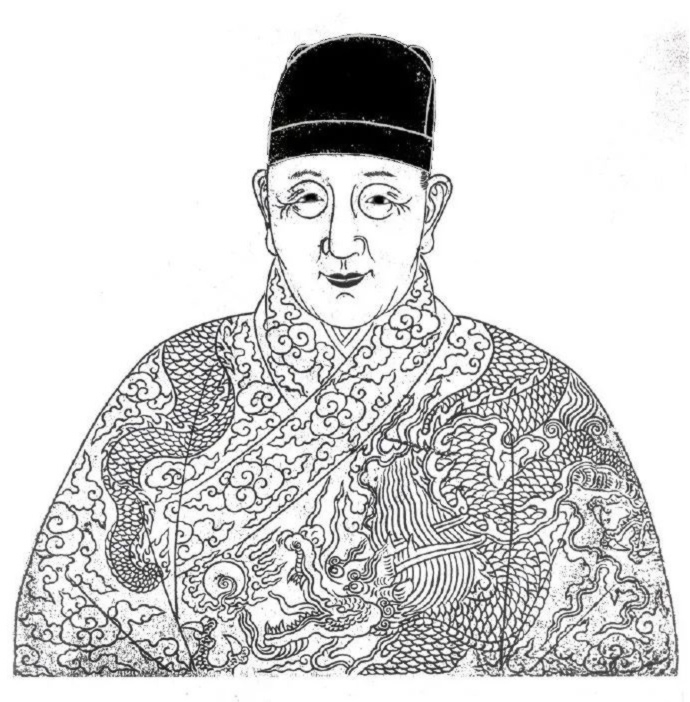
Wang Zhen led Emperor Yingzong's government from 1442 to 1449.

Wang Zhen's time had finally arrived. He possessed great talent, was direct, attentive, and charismatic, but over time, he became conceited. His power primarily stemmed from his personal influence over the Emperor, who held his teacher in the highest regard. Wang Zhen was also a skilled politician. He formed alliances with Xu Xi (徐晞), who was later promoted to minister of war, as well as Imperial Guard commander Ma Shun and his deputy and nephew Wang Shan, and Left Vice Minister of War Wang Ji, who previously organized the "youth-guards" (幼軍) of the young emperor, later also appointed as minister of war. Wang Zhen also had control over the Imperial Guard, which he did not hesitate to use against his opponents, and he had influence among the ministers. With these advantages, Wang Zhen easily gained the upper hand in politics. He began to push the grand secretaries, who were now in their seventies, out of active politics. Yang Shiqi died in 1444, and two years later, Yang Pu also died. After their deaths, only Cao Nai (曹鼐) remained a strong figure among the grand secretaries. His colleague Ma Yu (馬愉) only handled routine work, and the new grand secretaries appointed in the late 1440s—Gao Gu (高穀), Chen Xun (陳循), and Miao Zhong (苗衷)—did not have a significant impact on politics.

The system of grand coordinators (xunfu), who managed the "three provincial offices" (civil, military, and surveillance), had taken a definitive form in the provinces. They operated in all provinces except Fujian and in six of the nine border garrisons on the northern border. The immediate consequence of the introduction of grand coordinators was the transfer of command over the troops in the provinces to civilian hands. According to Fang Chao-ying, this change was likely due to the decline in the quality of hereditary officers.

During Emperor Yingzong's reign, the re-publishing of sets of Buddhist and Taoist classics was completed. Specifically, in 1440, the Buddhist collection Chinese Buddhist Canon (大藏經; Dàzàngjīng; 'Great Storage of Scriptures') consisted of 6361 volumes in 636 books, with a preface written by the Emperor. In 1445, the Taoist collection Zhengtong-era Daoist Canon (正統道藏; Zhèngtǒng dàocáng) consisted of 5305 volumes 481 books, and in 1443, a work on the moral patterns of On the Five Relationships (五倫書; Wǔlúnshū) with 62 volumes. The Emperor also wrote a preface to the new edition of the Song work on acupuncture Illustrated Manual of Acupuncture Points on a Bronze Figure (铜人腧穴针灸图经; Tóngrén Shùxué Zhēnjiǔ Tújīng) in 3 volumes. This work included text and illustrations engraved in stone and a bronze sculpture with 360 acupuncture points. The original illustrations and statue, created during the Song dynasty, had eroded and faded, so both were remade.

== Economy and finance ==
=== Economic downturn ===
In the mid-1430s, a sixty-year cold period began in the Northern Hemisphere, accompanied by sporadic floods and droughts that resulted in crop failures, leading to famines and epidemics. China was also struck by a series of natural disasters in the late 1430s and 1440s, with floods, droughts, epidemics, and famines occurring in succession. In 1448, the Yellow River breached its dams, causing the waters to flow into northern Jiangsu. The following year, another dam broke, diverting part of the Yellow River's flow into the Guo River and then the Huai River, eventually reaching the sea in southern Jiangsu. Flooding persisted into the 1450s, and the changing course of the Yellow River posed a threat to the water supply of Beijing.

The government attempted to assist the victims by remitting taxes in large quantities, particularly during the regency of Grand Empress Dowager Zhang, who consistently showed concern for the impoverished, but despite these efforts, dissatisfaction among the population continued to grow. This was largely due to the compulsory work system, which placed an unbearable burden on the people in some regions. Artisans evaded state demands and peasants abandoned their land, leading to a significant decrease in population in certain areas. On the other hand, bandits and vagabonds multiplied.

The economic decline in China from the early 1440s to the mid-1460s resulted in a decrease in porcelain production, particularly for export. The Emperor's prohibition on the private sale of blue-and-white porcelain in 1439, intended to safeguard the governmental monopoly, set further limits on production. In January 1448, the ban was reinforced and extended to forbid the production of porcelain in any colors other than blue and white for private sale in Raozhou Prefecture, where Jingdezhen, known for its porcelain, is located. These prohibitions may have been one of the reasons for the scarcity of porcelain from the Zhengtong, Jingtai and Tianshun eras (1436–1464).

The Three Yangs responded to the economic problems by cutting state spending. This was made worse by the struggles in the southwest during the 1430s and 1440s, which led to a decline in mining in the region. They subsequently cancelled overseas expeditions and restricted official foreign trade. These austerity measures were easier for them to accept because they directly affected the economic power of the eunuchs in the imperial palace, who were competing with other groups for power. The eunuchs were the ones involved in maritime expeditions and had a vested interest in silver mining, which was also limited in the mid-1430s.

=== Currency—the recognition of silver ===
By the end of the Xuande era, the government had recognized the failure to enforce baochao banknotes as the main currency and began tolerating silver. In 1433, Governor of South Zhili, Zhou Chen (周忱), introduced the payment of land tax in silver instead of rice in the most tax-burdened prefectures. From 1436, the officers of the Beijing garrison were paid in silver. In the same year, the land tax in South Zhili, Zhejiang, Jiangxi, and Huguang was also converted to silver; this transition was accompanied by a tax cut. According to historian Ray Huang, this was a concession to southern landowners and a reversal from the Hongwu Emperor's policy of suppressing the influence of wealthy landowners. Another historian, Richard Von Glahn, believes that it was an attempt to get the rich people's silver out of their coffers. Additionally, the government reduced silver mining to a minimum.

The surviving land sales contracts concluded in Huizhou from 1368 to 1500 demonstrate the complex search for the most suitable currency during the early Ming period. Initially, prices were set in silver until 1375, after which baochao banknotes were predominantly used until 1425, but there were instances where the price was set in grain from 1396 to 1436, and during the Xuande era (1426–1435), cloth was the preferred currency for price determination. Eventually, silver emerged as the clear winner, as all land contracts from 1456 to 1644 were priced in it.

After Wang Zhen gained influence in the government, the eunuchs pushed for the reopening of the silver mines under their supervision, but due to the low productivity of mining and the high demands of the eunuchs, there were a series of mining uprisings in Fujian, Zhejiang, and Jiangxi. After Emperor Yingzong was captured in a war with the Mongols in 1449, the new government restricted mining once again, but when he returned to power in 1457, the restrictions were lifted. Despite this, mining yields remained low.

The government's decision to allow payment in silver resulted in the rapid decline of banknotes, much to the dismay of the statesmen. By the 1430s, banknotes had practically disappeared from use, with the state only using them to pay employees to a limited extent and withdrawing them as a compulsory payment for trade fees. However, these small transactions were relatively isolated from the country's economy. While silver was used for large payments and taxes, copper coins remained the dominant currency for small transactions in cities.

=== Closure of state mints ===
In 1436, the Minister of Revenue proposed to buy out old banknotes and replace them with new ones covered in silver, but this proposal was ultimately unsuccessful. Around the same time, the government began to tolerate the use of coins in commerce, although their prohibition was not consistently enforced even before this time. While the use of coins was officially not allowed until 1436, following a petition from a prefect of Guangxi, the government had actually stopped the production of coins in either 1433 or 1436.

The lifting of the ban on the use of silver and copper coins in trade is a good example of the functioning of Ming legislation. Changes to laws were typically made based on petitions from mid-level officials (such as prefects) who requested exceptions for their areas of jurisdiction. After the Emperor's approval, which was published in the official gazette, such exceptions could be seen by other authorities as a precedent for establishing a new procedure and could be further expanded based on analogy. In this case, a request for permission to use copper coins as currency in one prefecture led to the legalization of not only copper coins, but also silver, throughout the country.

With the closure of the mints, the shortage of coins worsened over time. (Note: The state production of coins was not resumed until 1503.) Entrepreneurs responded to the demand for coins by producing them privately, which was illegal. Despite the efforts of disgruntled officials in Beijing, they were unable to suppress this private production, but they also failed to take measures to restore the state's coin production.

In the northern cities, particularly Beijing, coins were the primary form of currency during the 15th century. This led officials to criticize them as the reason for the failure of banknotes. In 1447, the Governor of North Zhili called for a renewed campaign against coinage, citing its exclusive use in trade in Beijing and the Grand Canal cities as the cause of the banknotes' failure. Despite efforts by his successor to lift the ban, the Ministry of Revenue continued to prohibit coinage until 1453. By the mid-1450s, private coins from Jiangnan had become more prevalent in the markets of Beijing, replacing Yongle's coins. Suggestions to combat private coinage by opening state mints were rejected, leading to the proliferation of illegal mints. These private coins were of lower quality, often containing tin or iron, but due to the scarcity of old coins, merchants had no choice but to use them, even at a nominal value. Some merchants refused to accept Ming coins altogether, while others only accepted silver. The shortage of currency resulted in a return to barter in certain regions, including Yunnan, Guizhou, Sichuan, Jiangxi, Huguang, Shaanxi, and Shanxi.

Private mints in Ming China also had an impact on foreign trade, as their coins were accepted as currency in other countries, despite the Chinese government's refusal to recognize them. The closure of these mints had far-reaching consequences, causing problems in places like Japan and Java. Japan, which had not minted coins since the 10th century, relied heavily on imports from China. The disruption of this supply in the early 15th century had a significant impact on the Japanese economy and even led to political turmoil, resulting in the division of Japan into competing domains during the Sengoku period.

== Fighting in the South ==
=== War in the Southwest ===
In the first quarter of the 15th century, on the southwestern borders of the Ming dynasty, one of the Shan states, Möng Mao, called Luchuan by the Ming, grew in strength under the rule of the ambitious Si Renfa, who ruled from 1413. By 1436, Si Renfa had begun to pose a threat to Ming positions in the area. In 1438, Mu Sheng, the military commander of Yunnan, was ordered to attack Möng Mao with an army of conscripts from Guizhou and Huguang. Initially, the Ming army was successful in defeating the enemy, but they soon encountered supply problems and struggled to adapt to the subtropical climate. The weakened Ming army subsequently suffered a heavy defeat in 1440.

Wang Zhen believed that Grand Empress Dowager Zhang's tax policy was too lenient and saw the war as an opportunity to increase state revenue. He therefore pushed for a new campaign to be launched. Reinforcements were sent from Sichuan, Guizhou, and Huguang to Yunnan, and in early 1441, Minister of War Wang Ji was placed in overall command. Wang Ji was an experienced civil official who had held the position of minister of war since 1435. He had also commanded the second to fourth campaigns in the Luchuan–Pingmian campaigns from 1441 to 1449. This was the first time in the history of the Ming dynasty that a civil official was given supreme command of the troops. Under Wang Ji's leadership, a Ming army of 50,000 soldiers successfully defeated the Shans. Si Renfa fled to Ava, a Burmese kingdom, and the territory of Luchuan was divided among other Shan states. As a reward for his success, Wang Ji was promoted to the rank of Count of Jingyuan, and his deputy Xu Xi took over as minister of war. Any criticism that resources were being drained from the North to fund the war in the South was suppressed.

In 1443–1444, the war continued with Ming troops unsuccessfully fighting against Ava, but in 1445, Ava surrendered, and Si Renfa committed suicide. Another campaign took place in 1448–1449, during which the Chinese and Ava successfully defeated Si Renfa's son, Si Jifa, who resided in Mong Yang west of the Irrawaddy River. In March 1449, Emperor Yingzong celebrated the victory.

These wars ultimately solidified Ming power in Yunnan, but at a high cost. Local rulers acknowledged Ming sovereignty and paid tribute to Beijing until the 16th century. Domestically, these wars were a success for Wang Zhen, increasing his prestige and reputation as a statesman, but they also revealed a lack of financial reserves and experienced generals on the northern frontier.

=== Rebellion in the Southeast ===
The increased demand for silver due to the implementation of silver-based taxes in 1436 led the government to shut down silver mines and prohibit small-scale silver mining along the border of Zhejiang and Fujian two years later. However, in an area with a high population and limited job opportunities, illegal silver mining persisted. In 1447, the leader of a group of silver miners in the mountains between Zhejiang and Fujian openly rebelled, gathering followers and forming an army.

In the interior of Fujian, two brothers, Deng Maoqi (鄧茂七) and Deng Maoba (鄧茂八), opposed the exploitation of tenants. The tenants themselves demanded that landlords cancel payments beyond the scope of their leases. In March 1448, the Deng brothers rebelled and began to conquer one county after another. The government attempted to calm the situation by forgiving unpaid taxes and granting a three-year exemption from compulsory labor for the population in the region, but the more radical faction of the rebels, numbering several hundred thousand men, refused to back down. The local militia was unable to handle the situation, prompting the government to send an army of 50,000 to the southeast in September 1448.

In late 1448, the rebel miners were defeated by government forces on the border between Fujian and Jiangsu. The Deng brothers were captured in February 1449, and their successors were defeated in May of the same year. According to Japanese historian Tanaka Masayoshi, the Deng brothers' revolt was the first Chinese peasant uprising aimed at challenging class relations within the village. The miners' revolt was ultimately suppressed by August 1449, and the remaining Fujian rebels were dispersed by 1452.

According to Fang Chao-ying, the Emperor's successes in the southeast and southwest may have led him to overestimate the strength of the Ming troops and his own willingness to personally lead the army.

== Trouble in the North ==
=== Relations with the Mongols ===
The Mongols were divided into three main groups: the Uriankhai in the southeast, the Eastern Mongols (also known as Tatars) in the east, and the Oirats in the west. In 1434, the leader of the Eastern Mongols, Arughtai, was defeated in battle by the Oirats. This gave the Oirats control over Mongolia, and their chief Toghon solidified their power by arranging for his daughter to marry the young Khan of the Eastern Mongols, Toghtoa Bukha. (Note: Toghon was not a descendant of Genghis Khan, therefore he could not become Khan.) Toghon emerged as the "de facto ruler of all Mongols", and after his death in 1440, his son Esen took over his position. Esen was more ambitious than his father, and in 1443 and 1445, he launched attacks on Hami, an important city on the route from China to Central Asia near the Chinese border. In 1448, he successfully conquered it. He also attempted to gain the support of the Mongol divisions in the Ming army in western Gansu. In the east, his authority extended to the borders of Korea. In Beijing, the unification of Mongolia was perceived as a threat by Wang Zhen's opponents. (Note: Wang Zhen profited from illegal trade activities, such as selling metal tools and weapons to the Oirats. He ignored proposals to strengthen defenses on the northern border and warnings about threats from Esen.)

The Mongols were primarily interested in free trade with China, specifically exchanging horses for luxury goods such as tea and silk. Some Mongols who resided along the border relied on agriculture for their livelihood and sought support from the Ming authorities, but the Ming government focused on trading tea for horses in Gansu, with tribes in present-day Qinghai, rather than on the border with the Mongols. This trade involved exchanging a million jin (258 tons) of tea for 14 thousand horses every three years. The Ming authorities tightly regulated and restricted trade with the Mongols, with Wang Zhen overseeing the profitable trade through a network of eunuch-trustees in border towns.

As Esen's power grew, so did his need for goods in order to maintain the loyalty of the Mongol tribes. This resulted in protests from the Chinese, who were concerned about the increasing influx of Mongols. By the late 1440s, up to two thousand Mongols were arriving in Datong, the main trading center, every year. The presence of such large groups of armed horsemen posed a security threat. This caused the Ming authorities to become increasingly hostile and fearful. (Note: Emperor Yingzong made efforts to suppress the influence of Mongolian culture by prohibiting the wearing of Mongolian attire and the use of the Mongolian language in Beijing.) In 1449, the Mongols were only given a fifth of the required goods, which led them to resort to force. The immediate cause of the war was Ming's refusal to grant Esen's request to marry an imperial princess for his son.

=== Defense of the Northeast ===
After the death of the Yongle Emperor, the state of defense along the northern borders began to deteriorate gradually. The quality of training, as well as the weapons and equipment, were declining. Soldiers from the Beijing garrison were even being used for the construction of government and private buildings. At this time, the Great Wall had not yet been built, and the border was only guarded by patrol battalions. These battalions were expected to hold off the enemy until the main forces arrived. The main forces were located in three fortified cities—Xuanfu, Datong, and Beijing—each housing several tens of thousands of soldiers. The largest force, consisting of 160,000 men, was stationed in Beijing. The reserves were scattered throughout northeastern China, in North Zhili, Shandong, and Henan. Since Xuanfu was less than 200 km from Beijing, the defense system lacked depth and relied on a quick and decisive response to any potential attack.

=== Tumu Crisis ===
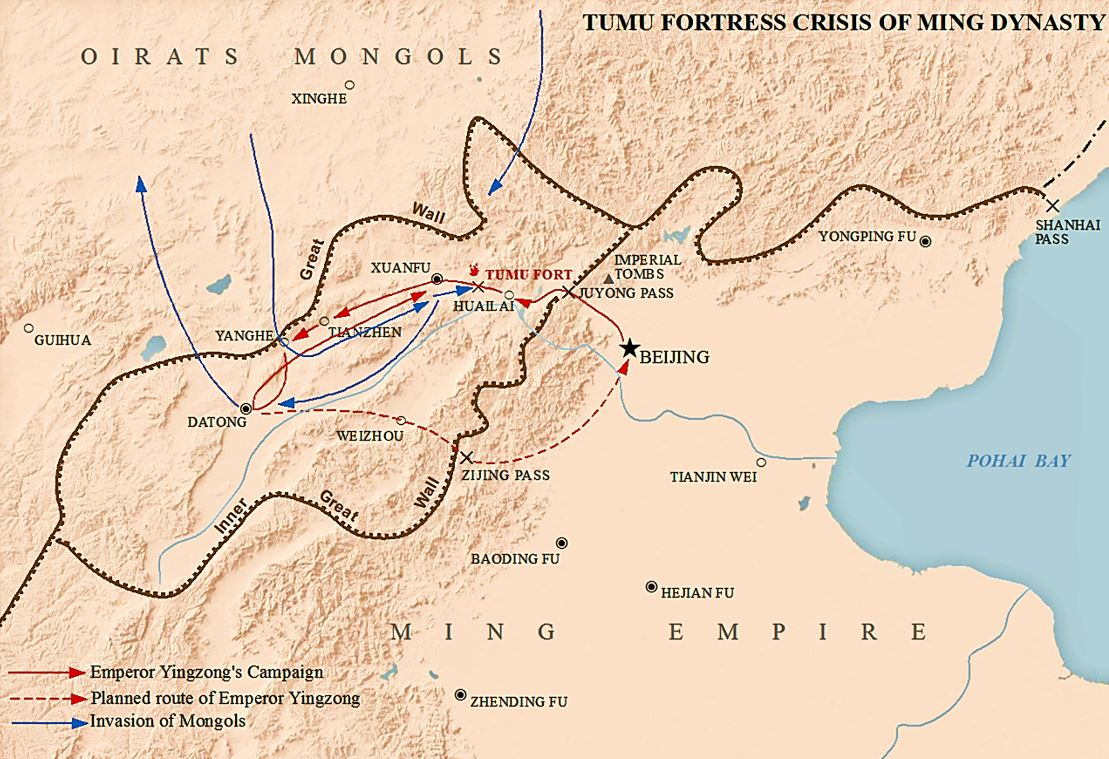
Emperor Yingzong's Tumu campaign in 1449

In the summer of 1449, unrest was spreading on the northern border. On 20 July, news arrived of a Mongol raid led by Esen. Emperor Yingzong ordered four generals and 45,000 soldiers from the Beijing garrison to advance to Datong and Xuanfu to guard the border. On 30 July, news reached Beijing that the Mongols had launched a large-scale invasion and had already attacked Datong. Without consulting the government, Emperor Yingzong ordered the Beijing garrison to be mobilized on 1 August and decided to personally lead the campaign against the Mongols. This decision was met with protest from Minister of War Kuang Ye (鄺埜) and his deputy, Yu Qian. Later, Minister of Personnel Wang Zhi also joined in the protest on behalf of a number of concerned officials. They believed that the Emperor's participation in the expedition was an unacceptably risky adventure. Emperor Yingzong defended his decision by citing precedents—all previous Ming emperors, except for the Jianwen Emperor, had personally led armies into battle.

On 3 August, the Emperor entrusted his younger brother, Zhu Qiyu, with the provisional administration of Beijing and departed the city on 4 August. However, due to a storm, he arrived at Xuanfu seven days later. The Emperor was accompanied by 20 experienced generals, most of whom held noble titles, and an equal number of high-ranking officials. They were also accompanied by hundreds of lower-ranking dignitaries. While the number of mobilized soldiers is unknown, it is often estimated to be around half a million, but according to Philip de Heer, this number is likely an exaggeration from a single contemporary source, as the actual number was likely much lower. Even under optimal conditions, it would have been difficult to supply such a large army. The troops were hastily assembled, poorly prepared, and incompetently led. Despite pleas from many members of his entourage to turn back, Wang Zhen advised the Emperor to continue on. The army reached Datong on 18 August, with more soldiers dying from starvation during the journey than from skirmishes with Mongol troops. Two days later, Emperor Yingzong finally issued the order to return. Upon reaching Xuanfu on 30 August, the Emperor learned that the rearguard had been defeated by the Mongols and that the auxiliary detachment of 40,000 men had been completely destroyed. The next evening, the army camped at the Tumu post station, without a source of water.

On the morning of 1 September, 20,000 Mongols launched a surprise attack on the Ming army, resulting in their defeat. Due to hunger and thirst, the Ming soldiers were unable to put up much resistance and only a few high-ranking officials were able to escape. Among the casualties were Wang Zhen, two dukes, two marquises, five counts, several generals, and hundreds of officials. The Emperor was captured and on 3 September was sent to Esen's main camp near Xuanfu. After reclaiming the area, the Ming troops recovered tens of thousands of firearms, armor, and other equipment. Despite their initial success, the Mongols failed in their attempts to occupy Xuanfu and Datong by using the captured Emperor Yingzong. They were also unsuccessful in their pursuit of Beijing and eventually retreated back to the steppe in November 1449. The Ming government restored the border but did not take any further offensive action.

Historians at the time, in an effort to avoid what is an obvious taboo of the country's head of state becoming a prisoner of war, referred to this chapter of Emperor Yingzong's life as the "Northern Hunt" (北狩). In Chinese historiography, the consequences of the Tumu crisis are often referred to as Tumu zhi bian. The term bian means "to turn" and is used to denote important turning points in Chinese history. As historian Charles Patrick Fitzgerald writes: "the event was a landmark in the Ming period. The era of Chinese military supremacy had ended, and henceforth the empire was on defensive on the northern frontier, a defensive which increasingly failed to withstand the nomad onslaughts".

== Captivity, return and house arrest ==
After news of Emperor Yingzong's capture reached Beijing, Empress Dowager Sun proclaimed the Emperor's two-year-old son, Zhu Jianshen, heir to the throne. (Note: Zhu Jianshen remained heir to the throne even after the Jingtai Emperor ascended to the throne. The Jingtai Emperor's own son did not replace him until June 1452.) She also appointed the Emperor's brother, Zhu Qiyu, to administer the country. Officials demanded punishment for the followers of Wang Zhen, whom they believed were responsible for the disaster, but when Zhu Qiyu refused, the officials became angry and killed two of Wang's allies. At the insistence of Yu Qian, Zhu Qiyu eventually agreed to confiscate Wang Zhen's fortune and execute his relatives. Yu Qian was then appointed as minister of war. He stabilized the situation by organizing the defense of Beijing with a new army. On 17 September, Zhu Qiyu ascended the throne as the Jingtai Emperor and declared his captured brother as Taishang Huangdi (太上皇帝; 'Emperor Emeritus').

The new Jingtai regime aimed to discredit the previous ruler, who was regarded as a failure. Border commanders were instructed not to communicate with him. Esen attempted to secure the release of Emperor Yingzong and sent two delegations to China to negotiate his return. However, it was not until September 1450 that he was successfully returned. During his time in captivity, the Oirats treated him fairly, and he returned to China as their friend. (Note: During his captivity, Yuan Bin, an officer who was also captured, and Ha Ming, an interpreter, provided Emperor Yingzong with meticulous care, greatly alleviating his predicament. Esen made sure to present a sheep to the Emperor every two days and a cow every seven days. In addition, banquets were held every five, seven, and ten days, and cow's milk and mare's milk were provided daily. Esen also arranged for Oirat women to clean the yurt given to the Emperor. Whenever the Emperor sat in the heated tent or rode on horseback, the Oirat men and women would bow down to show their respect. Emperor Yingzong even considered marrying Esen's sister.)

On 19 September, Emperor Yingzong arrived in Beijing. Officials were forbidden to greet him, and only two or three people were sent to meet him with a sedan chair and two horses. The Jingtai Emperor met him at the side door of the palace, and Emperor Yingzong renounced all claims to the throne. He was then assigned to the Southern Palace in the southeast of the Forbidden City, where he spent the next six and a half years as a virtual prisoner. His wives also lived with him there, and during this time, he fathered three sons. The living conditions were poor and the supply of resources was limited. Despite this, officials still requested permission to congratulate Emperor Yingzong on his birthday every year, but the government consistently refused.

On the night of 11 February 1457, the quiet atmosphere of the Southern Palace was abruptly shattered by a group of soldiers who forcefully entered the building, announcing to the former emperor that he had been reinstated and bringing him to the throne room. This coup was orchestrated by a small group, led by the eunuch-general Cao Jixiang (曹吉祥), the generals Shi Heng (石亨) and Zhang Yue (張軏), and the strategist Xu Youzhen. The initial invasion of the Southern Palace was carried out by 400 men, primarily consisting of Mongols. Later, an additional 2,800 men joined, with half of them escorting Emperor Yingzong and the other half occupying strategic locations in Beijing. The conspirators had contacted Emperor Yingzong two days prior to the coup, although there is another version that suggests it was a surprise for him. This event became known as the duomen—"forcing the palace gate", but later this name was considered too vulgar and the term fubi—"restoration of the throne"—began to be used.

== Second reign ==
Emperor Yingzong initially honored and promoted the organizers of the coup, (Note: Xu Yuzhen was appointed as the head of the Grand Secretariat and, concurrently, minister of war. Shi Heng was granted the title of duke (gong), while his corrupt cousin Shi Biao became a marquis (hou). Cao Jixiang was appointed as the head of the Directorate of Ceremonial, effectively becoming the leader of the eunuchs and the commander of the Beijing garrison. His adopted son, Cao Qin, was given the title of count (bo).) but once he solidified his position as the leader of the government, he gradually removed them one by one. Xu Youzhen was dismissed in August 1457, Shi Heng died in prison in February 1460, and Cao Jixiang and his family were executed for treason in August 1461. The new regime wasted no time in purging the Jingtai Emperor's followers, many of whom were falsely accused, such as Yu Qian. According to Fang Chao-ying, the deposed Jingtai Emperor was likely strangled, and his reputation tarnished. In contrast, Wang Zhen was given an official burial, a statue in the Zhihua Temple, and the posthumous name "Jingzhong" (旌忠). These purges only served to make Emperor Yingzong's regime unpopular. In an attempt to improve his image, the Emperor appointed respected scholars Xue Xuan and Li Xian (李賢) to the Grand Secretariat. In late June 1457, Shi Heng and Cao Jixiang decided that they no longer needed the cooperation of Xu Youzhen, who headed the Grand Secretariat, and had him arrested and banished to Yunnan. This move prompted the resignation of Xue Xuan and Minister of Justice Xuan Ni in protest.

In early 1460, mutual accusations and arrests led to the death of Shi Heng. Fearing a similar fate, Cao Jixiang and his adopted son Cao Qin planned a rebellion. In August 1461, Cao Qin, along with the Mongol troops under his command, rose up in rebellion. The immediate cause of this uprising was the death of the head of Imperial Guard who was investigating Cao's illegal business dealings with the Mongols. The rebel troops, led by Cao, set fire to both the west and east gates of the imperial city, but the flames were quickly extinguished by rain once the fighting began. They also killed several ministers before eventually surrendering to government troops. After the rebellion was defeated, Cao Qin committed suicide.

After the suppression of Cao's rebellion, the government regained stability. Li Xian took charge of the Grand Secretariat with support from Peng Shi, while Minister of Personnel Wang Ao oversaw the outer court and maintained the standards of the officials. The government remained stable in the subsequent years, with ministers and grand secretaries serving until their death or retirement.

Despite this, there were frequent conflicts between natives from the northern and southern regions of China. Until 1449, northerners were given preferential treatment, which was criticized by some as being influenced by Wang Zhen's pro-northern bias. During the reign of the Jingtai Emperor, many southerners had advanced in their careers, but after the restoration, the influence of southerners decreased. The Jingtai Emperor relied heavily on the advice of Li Xian, a prominent grand secretary from Henan who was known for his support of the northern party and tendency to favor northerners in appointments.

During his second reign, Emperor Yingzong was actively involved in managing the government, starting his day early and attending to state affairs and correspondence daily. He was known for his compassion, and he abolished the practice of concubines committing suicide following the Emperor's death. In 1457, he also granted freedom to Zhu Wengui, the Jianwen Emperor's son, who had been imprisoned in Nanjing since his father's overthrow in 1402.

Emperor Yingzong died on 23 February 1464 after a brief illness. His eldest son, Zhu Jianshen, succeeded him as the Chenghua Emperor. Emperor Yingzong's relationship with his son was strained, as he had doubts about his son's ability to rule. It was only after the grand secretaries, led by Li Xian, convinced him to preserve the succession of his eldest son that he agreed.

== See also ==
- Chinese emperors family tree (late)

== Notes ==
Emperor Yingzong of Ming House of Zhu Born: 29 November 1427 Died: 23 February 1464
Regnal titles
Preceded by Xuande Emperor	Emperor of the Ming dynasty (First reign); 31 January 1435 – 22 September 1449	Succeeded by Jingtai Emperor
Preceded by Jingtai Emperor	Emperor of the Ming dynasty (Second reign); 11 February 1457 – 23 February 1464	Succeeded by Chenghua Emperor
Chinese royalty
Vacant Title last held by Zhu Zhanji	Crown Prince of the Ming dynasty 1428–1435	Vacant Title next held by Zhu Jianshen
Honorary titles
Vacant Title last held by Emperor Shenzong of Western Xia	Emperor Emeritus of China; 22 September 1449 – 11 February 1457	Vacant Title next held by Qianlong Emperor (Qing dynasty)
