= Wang Zhen (eunuch) =

Chinese eunuch (d. 1449)

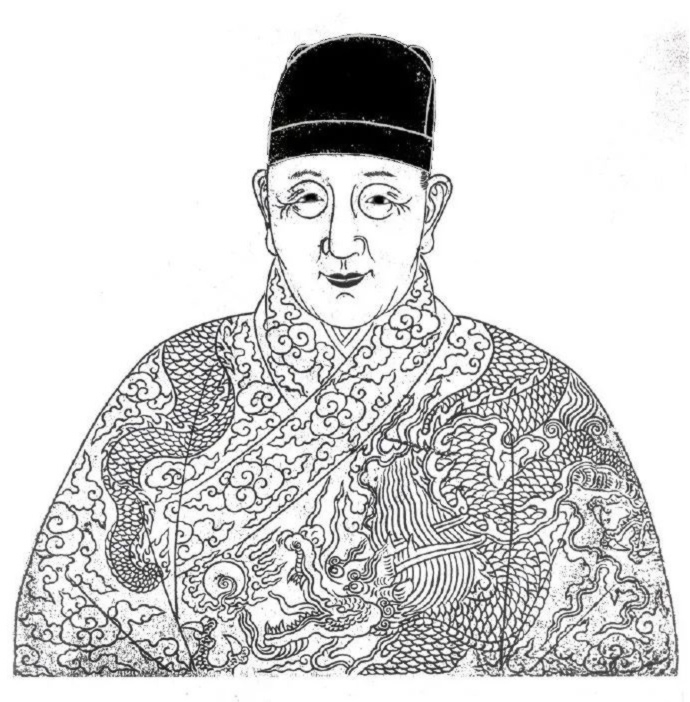
Wang Zhen

Wang Zhen (Chinese: 王 振; pinyin: Wáng Zhèn) was a Chinese court eunuch. As tutor and advisor to the underage Zhengtong Emperor, Wang Zhen rose to become the first Ming dynasty eunuch to wield significant political power, exercising dictatorial control over the court during the 1440s. He was killed in the Tumu Crisis of 1449 when Mongol forces defeated the Ming army he had advised the emperor to lead personally, resulting in the emperor's capture.

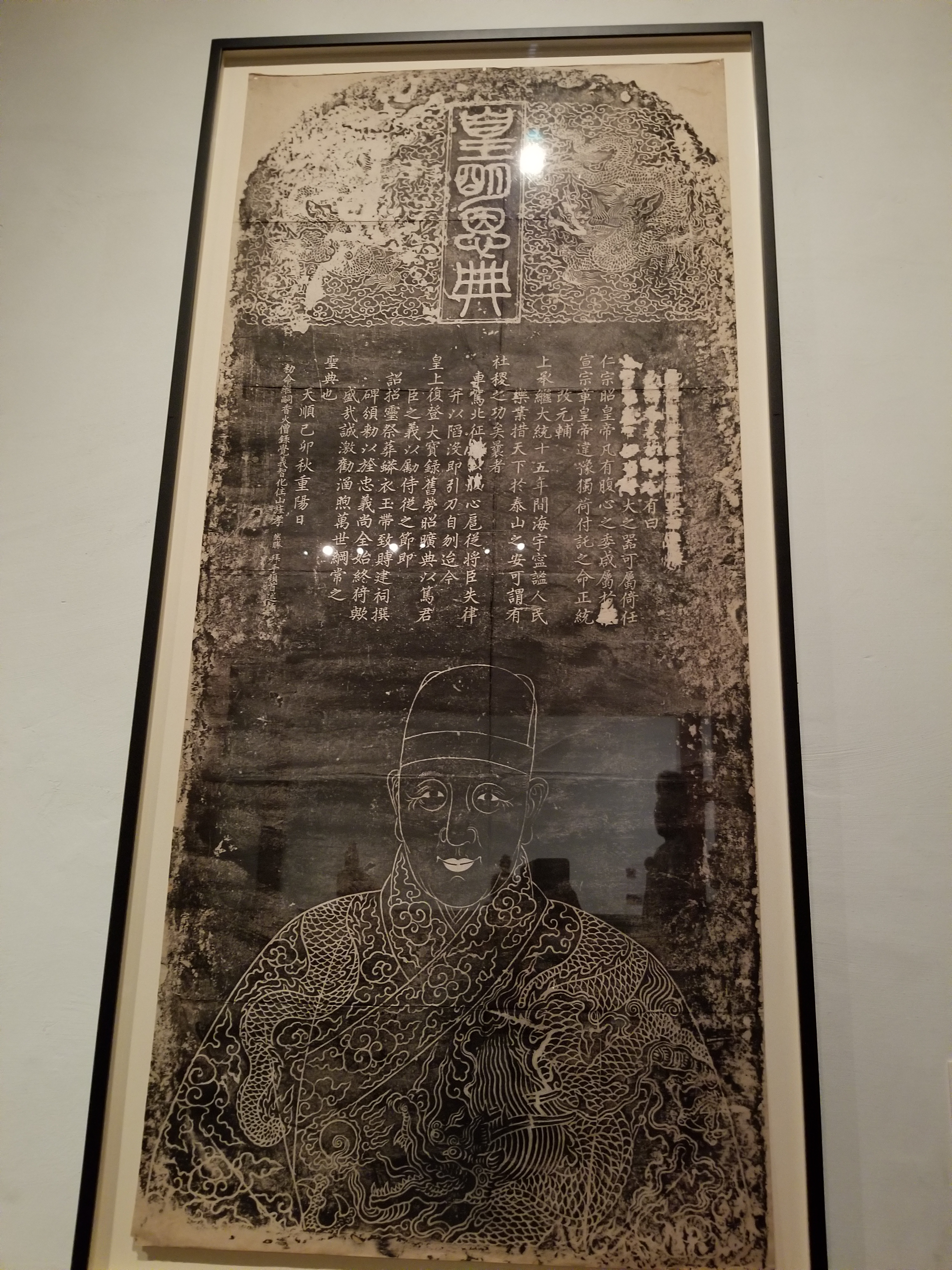
Rubbing of the Stele of Yingzong's Edict to make sacrifices to Wang Zhen in Zhihua Temple, now in the Philadelphia Museum of Art

== Early career and education ==
Wang Zhen hailed from Shanxi Province, and was possibly originally one of a group of Confucian teachers whom the Yongle Emperor had persuaded to undergo voluntary castration in order to instruct the palace women. If accurate, this background would have given him significant advantages when he entered the palace school for eunuchs (neishutang), which had been established by the Xuande Emperor in 1426. Wang received thorough literary education and administrative training at this school, becoming among the earliest chief eunuchs to benefit from formal education—a development that directly contradicted the Hongwu Emperor's policies against both educating eunuchs and allowing their participation in politics.

Prior to the death of the Xuande Emperor, Wang Zhen served as tutor to his son the crown prince, Zhu Qizhen.

== Rise to power ==
The sudden death of the Xuande Emperor in January 1435 at age thirty-seven created an institutional crisis. His eight-year-old son Zhu Qizhen succeeded him as the first child emperor of the Ming Dynasty, and thus there was no precedence on how the state would be governed, and his grandmother Grand Empress Dowager Zhang eventually emerged as leader of an informal regency that included three veteran grand secretaries—Yang Shiqi, Yang Rong, and Yang Pu (nicknamed the "Three Yangs")—who had served since the beginning of the Yongle reign, and three senior eunuch officials from the Directorate of Ceremonial, the highest office in the palace eunuch hierarchy. Wang Zhen joined this group in autumn 1435 when appointed to the Directorate at approximately age thirty-three, markedly younger than his colleagues but already influential through his close relationship with the new boy emperor, who viewed him as a mentor and confidant.

Initially, Grand Empress Dowager Zhang was able to successfully mediate between the powerful collective of officials and eunuchs, but her death in November 1442 removed the main check on Wang's ambitions just as the young emperor, now sixteen and recently married, began attending to government business. Yang Rong had died two years earlier, leaving two septuagenarian grand secretaries who lacked the energy to resist Wang's maneuvering. The grand empress dowager had recognized the danger and contemplated ordering Wang's suicide in 1437, but her young grandson and other officials had persuaded her not to.

After the grand empress dowager's death, Wang convinced the elderly grand secretaries to retire from active service, ostensibly to spare them the burden of drafting edicts. Their replacements proved unable to contest his control. Cao Nai, the most capable among them, died in 1449, while others either accommodated Wang's wishes or proved ineffectual. The deaths of Yang Shiqi in 1444 and Yang Pu in 1446 eliminated the last officials with sufficient prestige to challenge Wang's position. By the mid-1440s, Wang exercised extensive control over government operations. Officials deferred to him because the emperor continued to rely on his former tutor. Contemporary sources describe Wang as clever, alert, and charming. He overrode criticism from officials, imprisoned those who opposed him, and in some cases brought about their deaths.

The Zhihua Temple in Beijing was built in 1443 at his order.

In 1449, during the Tumu Crisis campaign against the Northern Yuan, he was killed, and the Ming emperor Zhu Qizhen was captured by Oirat Mongols. According to some reports, Wang Zhen was killed by his own officers.
