= Xie Huan =

Chinese painter

Xie Huan (simplified Chinese: 谢环; traditional Chinese: 謝環; pinyin: Xiè Huán; Wade–Giles: Hsieh Huan; active 1426–1452) was a Chinese painter of the early Ming Dynasty. He is best known for his painting of domestic settings, story-theme artwork, and landscape paintings.

The famous Chinese painter Shen Zhou admired his artwork, and collected art pieces by Xie Huan.

== Gallery ==
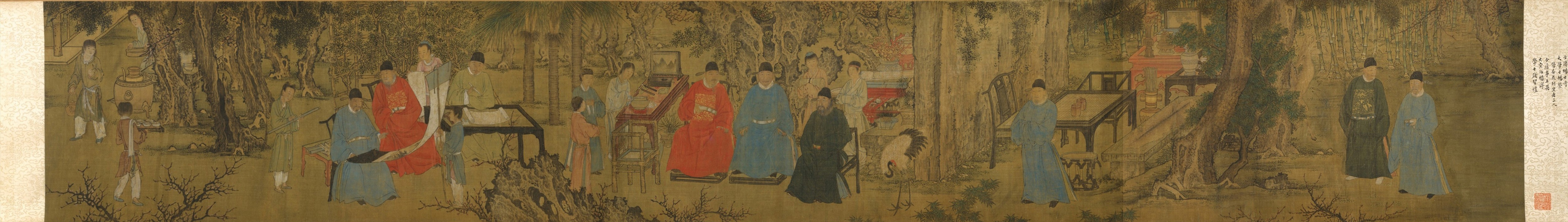
Xie Huan, Elegant Gathering in the Apricot Garden

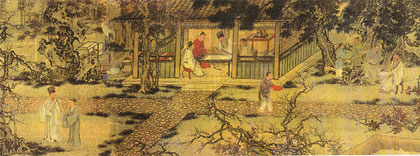
Xie Huan, Nine Old Charts in Xiangshan

== See also ==
- List of Chinese people
- List of Chinese painters
- Chinese art
- Chinese painting
