= 1453 =

1453 in various calendars
- Gregorian calendar: 1453; MCDLIII
- Ab urbe condita: 2206
- Armenian calendar: 902; ԹՎ ՋԲ
- Assyrian calendar: 6203
- Balinese saka calendar: 1374–1375
- Bengali calendar: 859–860
- Berber calendar: 2403
- English Regnal year: 31 Hen. 6 – 32 Hen. 6
- Buddhist calendar: 1997
- Burmese calendar: 815
- Byzantine calendar: 6961–6962
- Chinese calendar: 壬申年 (Water Monkey); 4150 or 3943 — to — 癸酉年 (Water Rooster); 4151 or 3944
- Coptic calendar: 1169–1170
- Discordian calendar: 2619
- Ethiopian calendar: 1445–1446
- Hebrew calendar: 5213–5214
- Hindu calendars
- Vikram Samvat: 1509–1510
- Shaka Samvat: 1374–1375
- Kali Yuga: 4553–4554
- Holocene calendar: 11453
- Igbo calendar: 453–454
- Iranian calendar: 831–832
- Islamic calendar: 856–857
- Japanese calendar: Kyōtoku 2 (享徳２年)
- Javanese calendar: 1368–1369
- Julian calendar: 1453; MCDLIII
- Korean calendar: 3786
- Minguo calendar: 459 before ROC 民前459年
- Nanakshahi calendar: −15
- Thai solar calendar: 1995–1996
- Tibetan calendar: ཆུ་ཕོ་སྤྲེ་ལོ་ (male Water-Monkey); 1579 or 1198 or 426 — to — ཆུ་མོ་བྱ་ལོ་ (female Water-Bird); 1580 or 1199 or 427

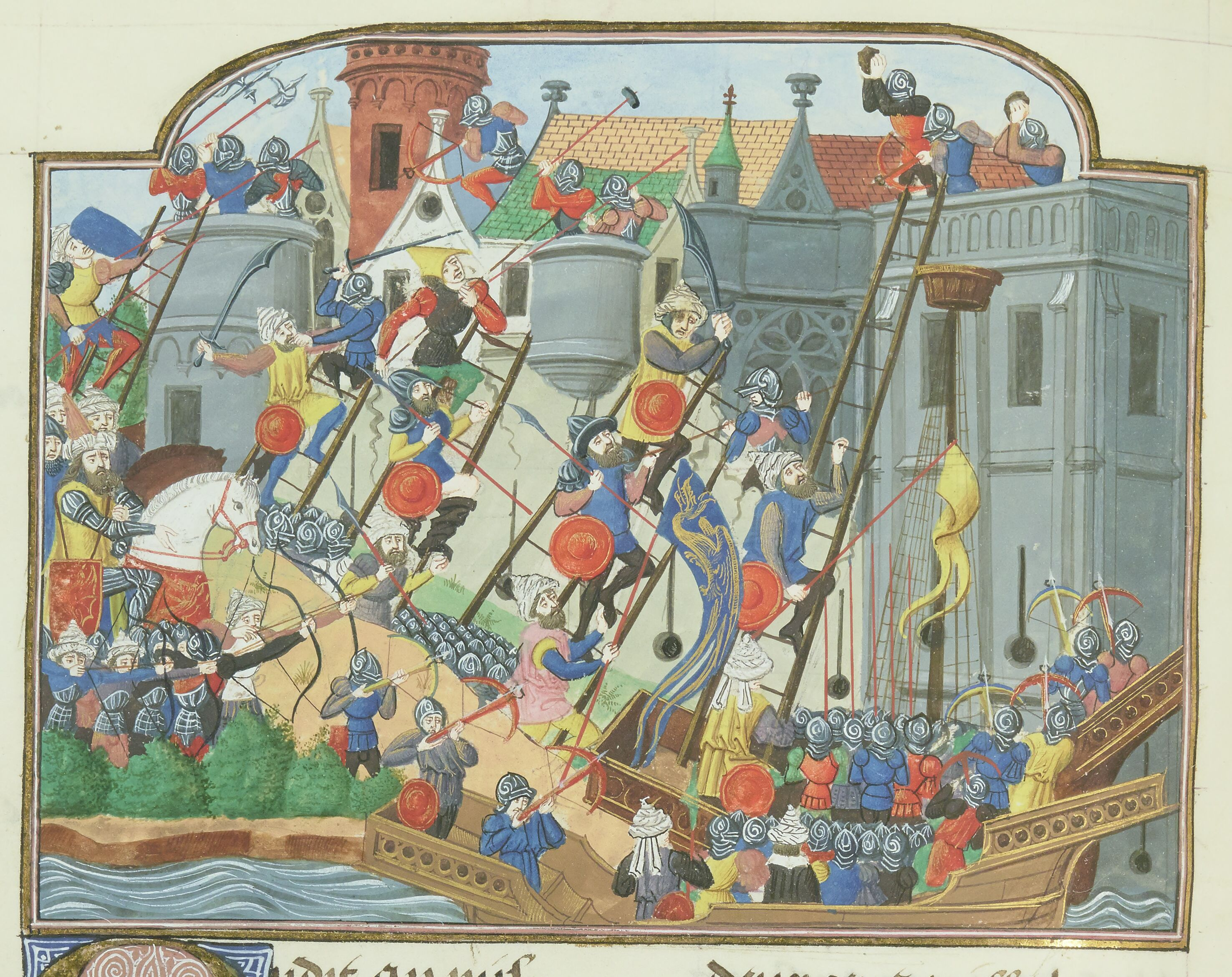
May 29: The Ottoman Turks conquer Constantinople, bringing the Byzantine Empire to an end.

Year 1453 (MCDLIII) was a common year starting on Monday of the Julian calendar, the 1453rd year of the Common Era (CE) and Anno Domini (AD) designations, the 453rd year of the 2nd millennium, the 53rd year of the 15th century, and the 4th year of the 1450s decade.

In April, the forces of the Ottoman Empire began besieging the Byzantine capital of Constantinople. The city's fall and the destruction of the empire in May sparked fear and religious fervor against the Ottomans across Europe. Pope Nicholas V issued a crusading bull and attempted to negotiate a peace in the ongoing war in northern Italy, which saw Venice and Naples fight with the forces of Florence, Milan, and their French allies. In July, France routed the forces of England at the Battle of Castillon, and subdued the last English holdouts over the following months, ending the Hundred Years' War and English territorial control in France. The Ming dynasty of China was troubled by the growing power of the newly-proclaimed Khagan Esen Taishi in Mongolia. A diplomatic incident occurred when an embassy mission from the Japanese Ashikaga shogunate rioted and attacked Chinese civilians. Violent succession disputes broke out in several countries, including the Ryukyu Kingdom in Okinawa and the Mamluk Sultanate of Egypt.

A "mystery eruption" occurred at an unknown location in the northern hemisphere in late 1452 or early 1453, beginning a 15-year period of colder weather across the hemisphere. A major drought continued in the Aztec Empire, leading to famine and many deaths. China was devastated by catastrophic flooding along the Yellow River and an exceptionally cold winter.

== Global events ==
A major volcanic eruption of unknown source likely occurred somewhere in the Northern Hemisphere in late 1452 or early 1453. Kuwae, a Pacific caldera (volcanic landmass) in Vanuatu, was previously seen as a candidate for this eruption, but ice core analysis has instead linked it to another mystery eruption in 1458. Attested through dendrochronology (analysis of tree rings) across the northern hemisphere for 1453, temperatures decreased by 0.4–6.9°C (0.7–12.4°F), beginning a 15-year cold period.

== Africa ==
Sayf al-Din Jaqmaq, sultan of the Mamluk Sultanate of Egypt since 1438, died on February 13. His son Al-Mansur Uthman, only 18 years old, ascended to the throne; desperate to avoid being overthrown for his youth, Uthman attempted to purchase the loyalty of various high-ranking mamluks using heavily debased coinage. Supreme Commander Sayf al-Din Inal led a coup d'état alongside his Zahiri emir allies against the young sultan, seizing the Cairo Citadel. In April, Abbasid caliph Al-Qa'im accepted Inal as sultan.

== Asia ==
Hostile relationships continued between the Ming dynasty and the growing Oirat confederation of Esen Taishi. Esen had captured Emperor Yingzong in battle in 1449, and killed Northern Yuan leader Taisun Khan in early 1452. In early 1453, Minister of War Yu Qian considered a plan for an offensive campaign against the Oirat and Mongols, but ultimately focused on maintaining the northern border, unwilling to disrupt the newly reformed command structure of the Ming military. Having dominated the Mongol tribes after defeating Taisun, Esen declared himself Khagan of the Northern Yuan, becoming the first Northern Yuan ruler outside the Borjigin clan. The alarmed Ming government heightened border security, and debated whether to recognize Esen as Khagan. However, Esen's declaration led to significant internal conflict against his rule.

A recent series of annual floods worsened in central China, with the Yellow River devastating Henan. Urgent repairs to dikes along the Grand Canal were initially unsuccessful, leading to the appointment of the engineer Xu Youzhen to supervise efforts to maintain the canal and vital grain shipments to Beijing. An exceptionally cold winter caused heavy snow across northern and central China at the end of the year, with many deaths reported in the icebound Huai River valley. Following years of unrest among the Yao and Miao peoples, a regional uprising against Ming rule broke out in Guizhou and Huguang. The somewhat unstable political legitimacy of the Jingtai Emperor in the wake of Yingzong's capture was heightened after the death of Zhu Jianji, his son and heir apparent, on December 18.

After a twenty-year halt, the Japanese Ashikaga Shogunate dispatched a large tribute mission to the Ming court. The envoys were angered by court officials' refusal to pay high prices for the wares, and rioted along their return journey, looting civilian houses in Lingqing, Shandong, and attacking officials sent to investigate. Emperor Jingtai decided not to capture the riotous diplomats, hesitant to upset diplomatic relations with Japan. In the Ryukyu Kingdom on the island of Okinawa, a succession dispute between Princes Shiro and Furi resulted in the burning of Shuri Castle. Shō Taikyū, possibly a third party to the conflict, was enthroned as king the following year.

== Europe ==
=== Central and Eastern Europe ===
In 1452–1453, the twelve-year-old Ladislaus the Posthumous assumed power in Hungary without a coronation. The previous de facto ruler, regent János Hunyadi, maintained a position in government. On October 28, Ladislaus was crowned King of Bohemia in Prague, ending an interregnum that had lasted since the death of Albert II in 1439.

Grand Prince Vasily II of Moscow solidified his power in the waning years of the Muscovite War of Succession. Rival throne claimant Dmitry Shemyaka had been forced to flee to the Novgorod Republic several years prior after a military defeat in Galich. He continued his efforts to take control of Moscow, with his strongholds in the rural northern areas along the Northern Dvina and Vychegda. In 1453, he returned to Veliky Novgorod, where he was fatally poisoned, possibly on Vasily's orders.

==== Fall of Constantinople ====
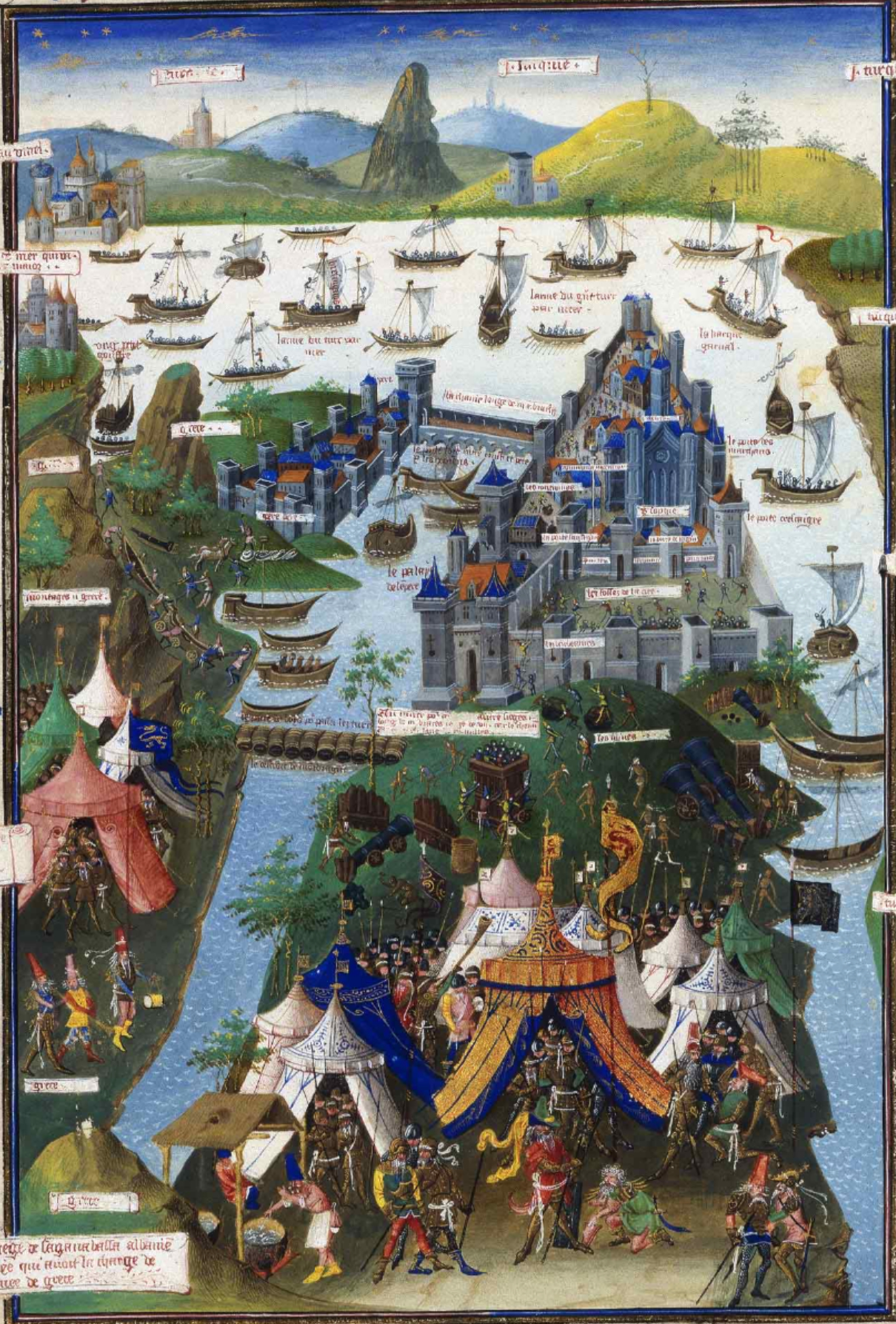
Mid-1450s French miniature depicting the Fall of Constantinople

Ottoman sultan Mehmed II began preparations to conquer the city of Constantinople, the capital of the declining Byzantine Empire, soon after his ascension to the throne in 1451. He had fortified the European coast north of the city, giving him full control over the Bosporus Strait. Mehmed mobilized the Ottoman army in early January, and arranged for large bombards to be brought to the staging areas. Some Ottoman forces attacked the Byzantine strongholds of Mesambria and Selybria later in January; Mesambria quickly surrendered, while Selybria held out until March. Mercenary forces led by the Genoese captain Giovanni Giustiniani arrived in the city on January 26, joining Venetian forces stationed in the city.

Ottoman forces began besieging Constantinople itself on April 6, with Mehmed hoping to starve the city into surrender. Although the city's population had declined greatly since its peak, food shortages set in quickly; an emergency order was given to distribute bread to the family of soldiers, as many had abandoned their posts to care for their starving families. With the entrance to the city's harbor, the Golden Horn, blocked by the Byzantines, Ottoman forces transported their ships from the Bosporous into the Golden Horn by hauling them over the hills of Pera. After three smaller assaults over the prior weeks, the Ottomans launched a mass assault on the morning of May 29. The third wave of the assault took the city's walls and subdued the defenders, with the Byzantine emperor Constantine XI Palaiologos dying in unclear circumstances. Ottoman forces sacked the city for three days.

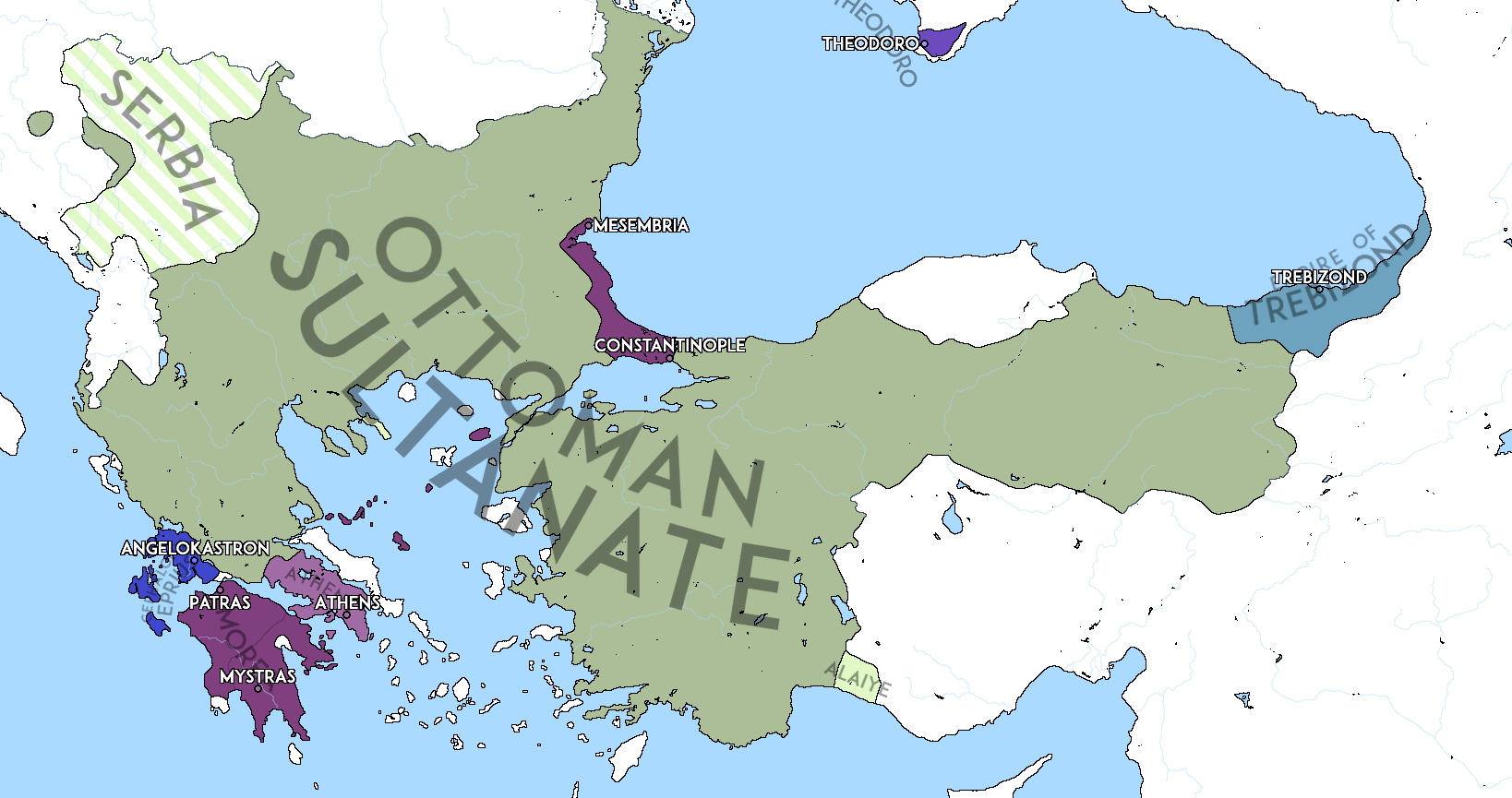
The Byzantine Empire and its successor states before the fall of Constantinople in 1453

Some rump states of the Byzantine Empire still remained — the Despotate of the Morea and the separatist Empire of Trebizond. Demetrios and Thomas Palaiologos shared the title of Despot of the Morea, and fought among themselves. Later in 1453, a rebel leader named Manuel Kantakouzenos led a group of Albanians in the Morea into a rebellion against the Palaiologos despots. Mehmed dispatched the Ottoman general Turahanoğlu Ömer Bey to put down the revolt, although he would not see immediate success.

The fall of Constantinople caused great fear, anxiety, and anger among Christian leaders throughout Europe. Anti-Turkish sentiment spread widely. As the news spread across Europe, songs and poems were composed lamenting the fall of the city and condemning the Ottoman Empire. Prominent examples from 1453 include Balthasar Mandelreiß's poem Türkenschrei, commissioned by the Holy Roman imperial court, and Michael Beheim's song-poem Von den Türken und dem adel sagt dis. Pope Nicholas V called for a crusade against the Ottoman Empire, issuing a crusading bull on September 30.

=== Western Europe ===
==== Italy ====
In Rome, a plot by the humanist nobleman Stefano Porcari to overthrow Pope Nicholas V was discovered and put down by Papal forces in early January. Porcari escaped capture multiple times, but was eventually discovered hiding in a chest, and was executed on January 9. Meanwhile, a series of northern Italian regional conflicts centered on Lombardy continued in 1453. Francesco Sforza, who had risen to power in Milan, allied with the Republic of Florence against their mutual enemies, Venice and the Kingdom of Naples under Alfonso V of Aragon. In 1452, Milan and Florence entered into an alliance with Charles VII of France, who was opposed to the potential expansion of Alfonso's control in Italy. Held up by its campaign against the English, France was initially unable to offer any direct aid, but was able to prevent the Duchy of Savoy, a Venetian ally, from invading Lombardy.

On June 14, Ludovico Gonzaga of Mantua defended Mantua against Venetian forces led by his brother, Carlo Gonzaga. René of Anjou, a French nobleman who had previously ruled Naples, allied with Florence and invaded Italy in August 1453 with a force of 2,000 soldiers, which soon grew to 3,000. Initially attempting to negotiate with the Venetians, René declared war on the republic on 10 October. Together with Milan and Florence, his forces managed to capture the region around Cremona, Bergamo, and Brescia by late November, although the onset of winter put a halt to the campaign. Concerned by the fall of Constantinople, Pope Nicholas V attempted to negotiate peace in the region in order to unite Christian Europe against the Ottoman Empire. Peace talks sponsored by Nicholas began in November. His efforts would materialize in April of the following year as the Treaty of Lodi.

==== England and France ====
The Parliament of England met at Reading on March 6. The members of the parliament were highly receptive to King Henry VI's rule due to the crushing of Jack Cade's Rebellion in 1450 and the reconquest of Gascony by John Talbot in 1452. Parliament approved a grant giving Henry the ability to raise an army of 20,000 archers for a period of six months, likely intend for a future reconquest of Gascony or Normandy.

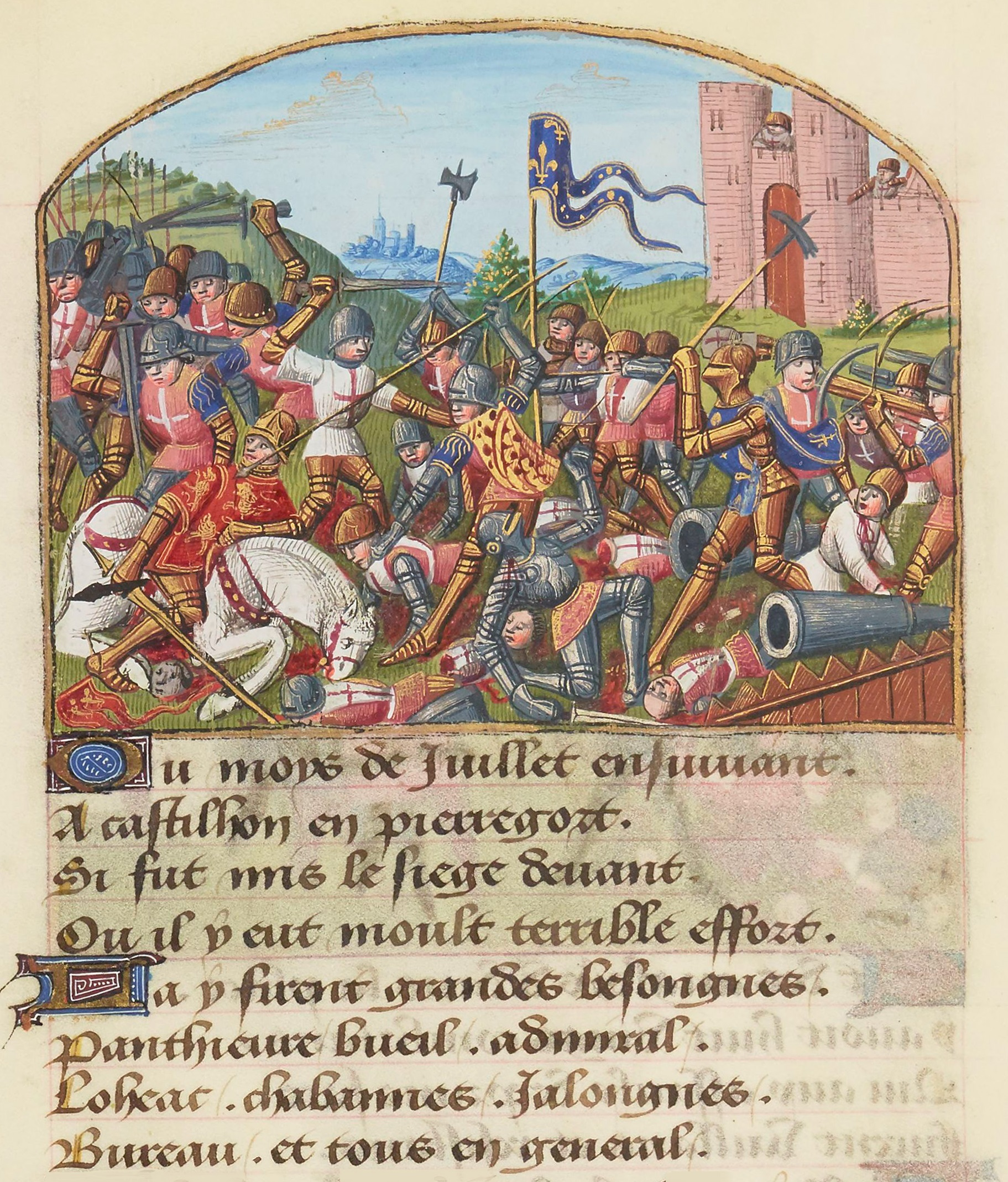
1484 depiction of the Battle of Castillon

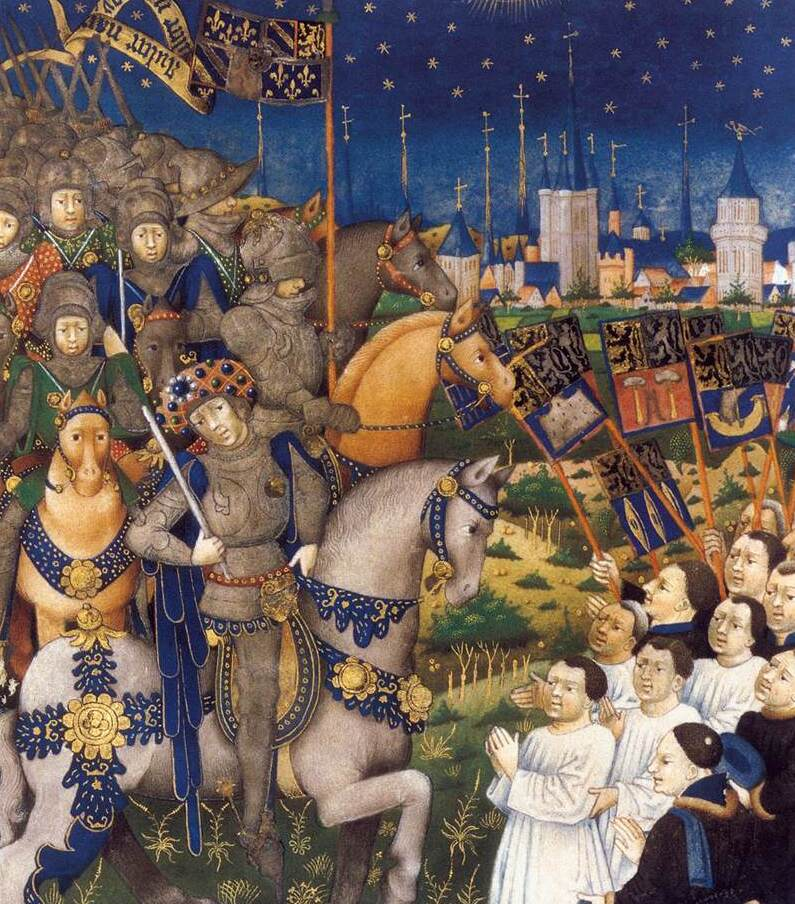
1450s depiction of the surrender of Ghent to Philip the Good after the Battle of Gavere

A reinforcement of over 2,000 men led by a number of prominent noblemen was sent to Gascony in March, increasing Talbot's forces to upwards of 7,300. However, the French navy was able to cut off English access to Bordeaux via the Gironde estuary, preventing further reinforcement. On July 17, the French routed the English army at the Battle of Castillon, killing Talbot. Charles VII's forces moved further into Gascony, laying siege to Bordeaux in August. The city, alongside the holdout of Rions, surrendered on October 20, ending the English presence in the region and bringing a close to the last phase of the Hundred Years' War.

==== Holy Roman Empire ====
The town of Ghent was embroiled in a rebellion against the Burgundian State under Duke Philip the Good. Originating from a political dispute between Philip and Ghent, Philip declared war on the town in 1452. In February–March 1453, a Ghenter raiding party attacked several towns in the surrounding region, including Kortrijk. Philip's rival, Charles VII of France, supported the Ghent rebels, although was unable to offer direct military support due to his ongoing war against the English. With peace negotiations over the spring stalled, Philip attacked the castles around Ghent in June and July, and decisively defeated the rebels at the Battle of Gavere on July 23. The town was forced to pay reparations to fund Philip's campaign, although it was not occupied or plundered.

The Giant Bible of Mainz was finished on July 9, 1453. It possibly served as an inspiration for the Gutenberg Bible, the first large-scale book produced using a printing press and moveable type. Johannes Gutenberg was overseeing preparations for his bible in 1453 after beginning work on it in 1450. Early copies would be bound and distributed by 1456.

== The Americas ==
A major drought which began in 1450 continued to affect the Aztec Empire. Although famine conditions had already begun to set in, they worsened in 1453, and people resorted to famine foods such as the roots of wild plants, corn silk, and agave. Some sold themselves into slavery in exchange for maize. Many died from starvation, especially due to early frosts in the autumn of 1453. The drought and famine would only intensify in the following year.

== Births ==
- January 6 – Girolamo Benivieni, Italian poet
- March 2 – Johannes Engel, German doctor, astronomer and astrologer
- September 1 – Gonzalo Fernández de Córdoba, Spanish general and statesman
- October 13 – Edward of Westminster, Prince of Wales, only son of Henry VI
- October 25 – Giuliano de' Medici, Italian nobleman
- November 7 – Filippo Beroaldo, philosopher and scholar
- November 15 – Alfonso, Prince of Asturias

=== Date unknown ===
- Afonso de Albuquerque, Portuguese naval and military commander
- Firdevsī-i Rūmī, Turkish poet
- Shin Mahasilavamsa, Burmese poet
- Sultan-Khalil, Sultan of the Aq Qoyunlu

== Deaths ==
- January 9 – Stefano Porcari, Italian nobleman and humanist politician
- February 13 – Sayf al-Din Jaqmaq, Egyptian Mamluk sultan
- May 29
  - Constantine XI Palaiologos, Byzantine emperor
  - Demetrios Palaiologos Metochites, Byzantine noble and ambassador
  - Orhan Çelebi, Ottoman prince
- June 2 or June 3 – Loukas Notaras, Byzantine statesman and naval commander
- June 22 – Álvaro de Luna, Spanish knight and statesman
- July – Jacques de Lalaing, Burgundian knight
- July 17
  - John Talbot, 1st Earl of Shrewsbury, English nobleman and military leader
  - John Talbot, 1st Viscount Lisle, English nobleman, son of the Earl of Shrewsbury
- December 16 – Zhu Jianji, crown prince of the Ming dynasty
- December 24 – John Dunstaple, English composer

=== Date unknown ===
- Dmitry Shemyaka, claimant to the Principality of Moscow
- Giovanni Giustiniani, Genoese mercenary
- Nguyễn An, Vietnamese-born Ming dynasty court eunuch and architect
- Sophia of Lithuania, Grand Princess of Moscow
