= Xing An (eunuch) =

Chinese eunuch (1389–1459)

Xing An, (Note: simplified Chinese: 兴安; traditional Chinese: 興安; pinyin: Xīng ān; Vietnamese: Hưng An) a native of Đại Việt (present-day northern Vietnam), was a Ming dynasty eunuch.

== Biography ==
During the reign of the Xuande Emperor (r. 1425–1435), Xing An served as Personnel Eunuch Attendant (長隨) and Chief Steward (奉御), managing the treasury's receipts and disbursements. In 1436, when Emperor Yingzong ascended the throne, he and the eunuch Jin Ying were both favored and trusted.

In the autumn of 1449, Emperor Yingzong was captured by the Oirats during the Tumu Crisis. Zhu Qiyu, Prince of Cheng (the later Jingtai Emperor), called upon him and Xing An convene court officials to discuss state affairs. Reader-in-waiting Xu Cheng proposed relocating the capital south, but was rebuked by Xing, who said, "Anyone who dares to suggest relocation will be executed". Xing then went to inform Empress Dowager Sun and advised Prince of Cheng to appoint Yu Qian to prepare for war and defense.

In 1450, the leader of the Oirats, Esen, besieged the capital and reached the Deshengmen. The Jingtai Emperor ordered Xing and Li Yongchang (李永昌) to work together with Yu and Shi Heng to manage military affairs. Esen sent envoys to negotiate peace and wanted to return Emperor Yingzong. When the court discussed appointing envoys to go on the mission, the Jingtai Emperor asked him to come out and speak to the courtiers, saying, "Who among you is suitable to respond to the envoy? Who can be like Wen Tianxiang and Fu Bi?" Minister Wang Zhi said that his scolding of the courtiers was inappropriate, and Xing was speechless. Chief Supervising Secretary Li Shi (李寔) was sent to deliver a message, but the edict did not mention the return of the former emperor. Li was greatly surprised and asked for clarification at the Grand Secretariat, where he met Xing on the way. Xing told him, "Just follow the decree and don't worry about anything else". Later, the Jingtai Emperor wanted to crown his son Zhu Jianji as the heir to the thorne, and many suspected that he was involved in the conspiracy. Xing possesses moral integrity and recognizes Yu's virtuous character, making every effort to protect him.

In 1456, he was ordered to visit the critically ill Yu with Shu Liang (舒良). In 1457, Emperor Yingzong was restored to the throne, and the eunuchs Wang Cheng (王誠), Shu, Zhang Yong (張永), Wang Qin (王勤), and others who had been trusted by the Jingtai Emperor were executed. They were said to be involved in changing the heir and conspired with Yu and Wang Wen (王文) to enthrone a vassal prince. The supervising secretaries and censors accused Xing, Wang Cheng, and Shu of being accomplices and should be punished together. However, Emperor Yingzong took into consideration Xing's old age and showed leniency by only stripping him of his positions and allowing him to retire.

== Notes ==
Political offices
Preceded by Jin Ying	Seal-holding Eunuch Director of the Directorate of Ceremonial; 1450–1457	Succeeded by Niu Yu
