= Defense of Beijing =

1449 conflict between the Oirats and the Ming dynasty

Defense of the Capital
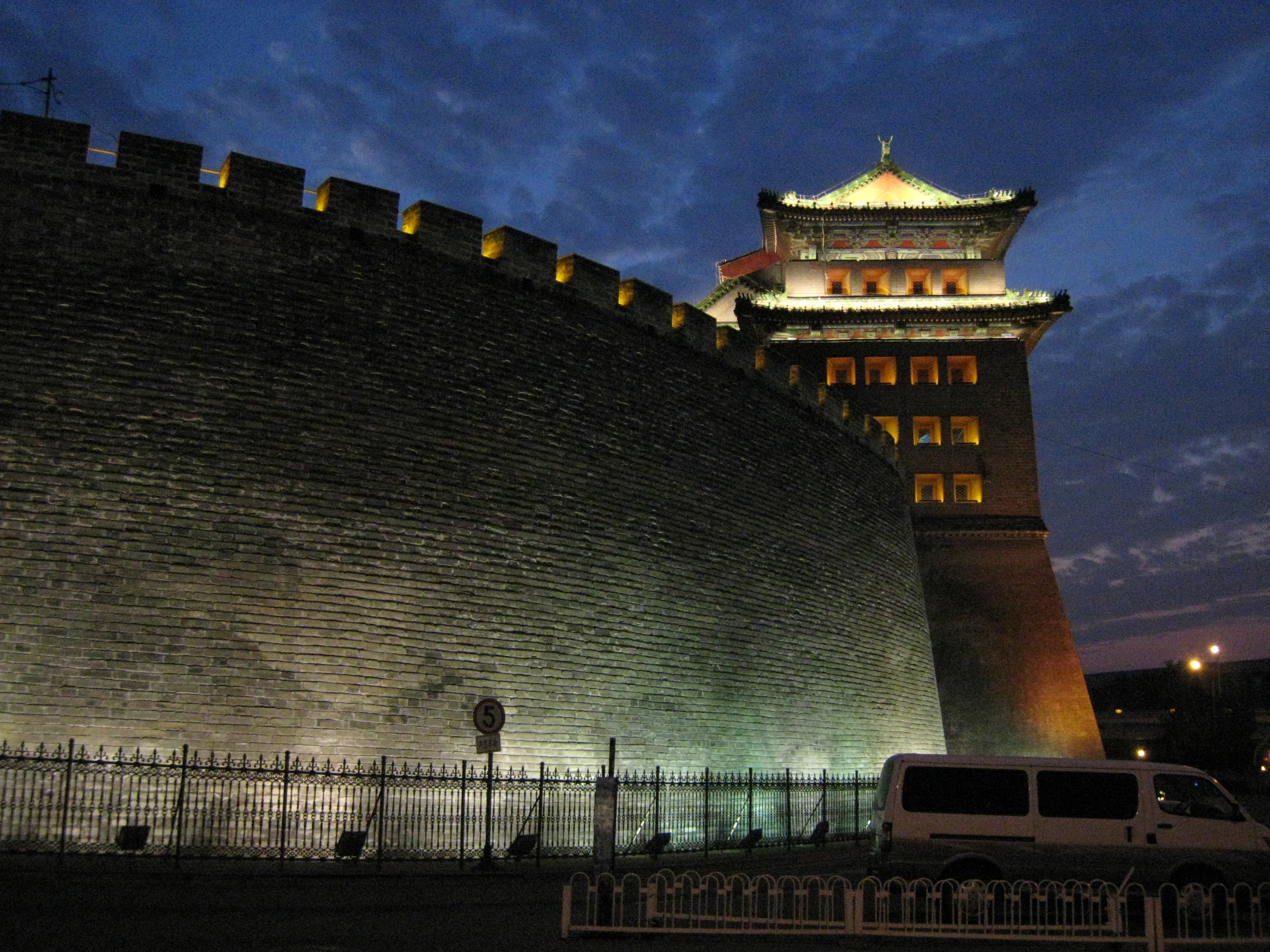
- Deshengmen, one of the main gates of Beijing
Date	October 1449
Location	Beijing
Result	Ming victory

Belligerents
Oirat Mongols	Ming dynasty

Commanders and leaders
Esen Taishi	Jingtai Emperor; Yu Qian

Strength
70,000	220,000

Chinese name
- Traditional Chinese: 京師保衛戰
- Simplified Chinese: 京师保卫战
Transcriptions
Standard Mandarin
- Hanyu Pinyin: Jīngshī bǎowèi zhàn

Defense of Beijing
- Traditional Chinese: 北京保衛戰
- Simplified Chinese: 北京保卫战
Transcriptions
Standard Mandarin
- Hanyu Pinyin: Běijīng bǎowèi zhàn

The Defense of the Capital, also known as the Defense of Beijing, was a defensive battle fought between the Ming dynasty of China and the Oirat Mongols in 1449. The battle followed the Ming defeat in the Tumu Crisis, during which Emperor Yingzong was captured by the Oirat leader Esen Taishi. Seeking to exploit the Emperor's captivity, Esen advanced on the Ming capital, but the Ming court rejected his overtures, enthroned the Jingtai Emperor, and placed Minister of War Yu Qian in charge of the city's defense. Under Yu's leadership, Ming forces repelled the invading army led by Esen outside the walls of Beijing.

== Background ==
The Ming dynasty was established in China in 1368 when Zhu Yuanzhang (the Hongwu Emperor), a former peasant rebel, overthrew the Mongol-led Yuan dynasty and forced the Mongols to retreat back to the Mongolian steppe. In the early Ming period, the Oirats, or Western Mongols, were one of the major Mongol groups on the steppe, ruled successively by Mahmud (d. 1416) and his son Toghon, and frequently clashed with the Eastern Mongols. In 1434, the Oirats defeated the Eastern Mongols and emerged as the dominant power on the steppe. Toghon died in 1439 and was succeeded by his son, Esen Taishi. He subsequently completed the unification of the Mongol tribes by force and brought the Three Uriankhai Guards, which had been under Ming control, under his authority. As Esen's power and influence expanded, so did his dependence on these goods to maintain the loyalty of the Mongol tribes. By the late 1440s, up to 2,000 Mongols arrived annually at the border markets, raising security concerns for the Ming authorities. The Ming government protested the excessive number of incoming Mongols, further straining relations.

In early 1449, Esen sent a tribute mission of 3,500 men with horses to the Ming court, but the Ming reduced the rewards granted to the envoys and lowered the price paid for the horses. Angered by the decision, Esen assembled his forces and launched a major invasion of the Ming frontier in July 1449.

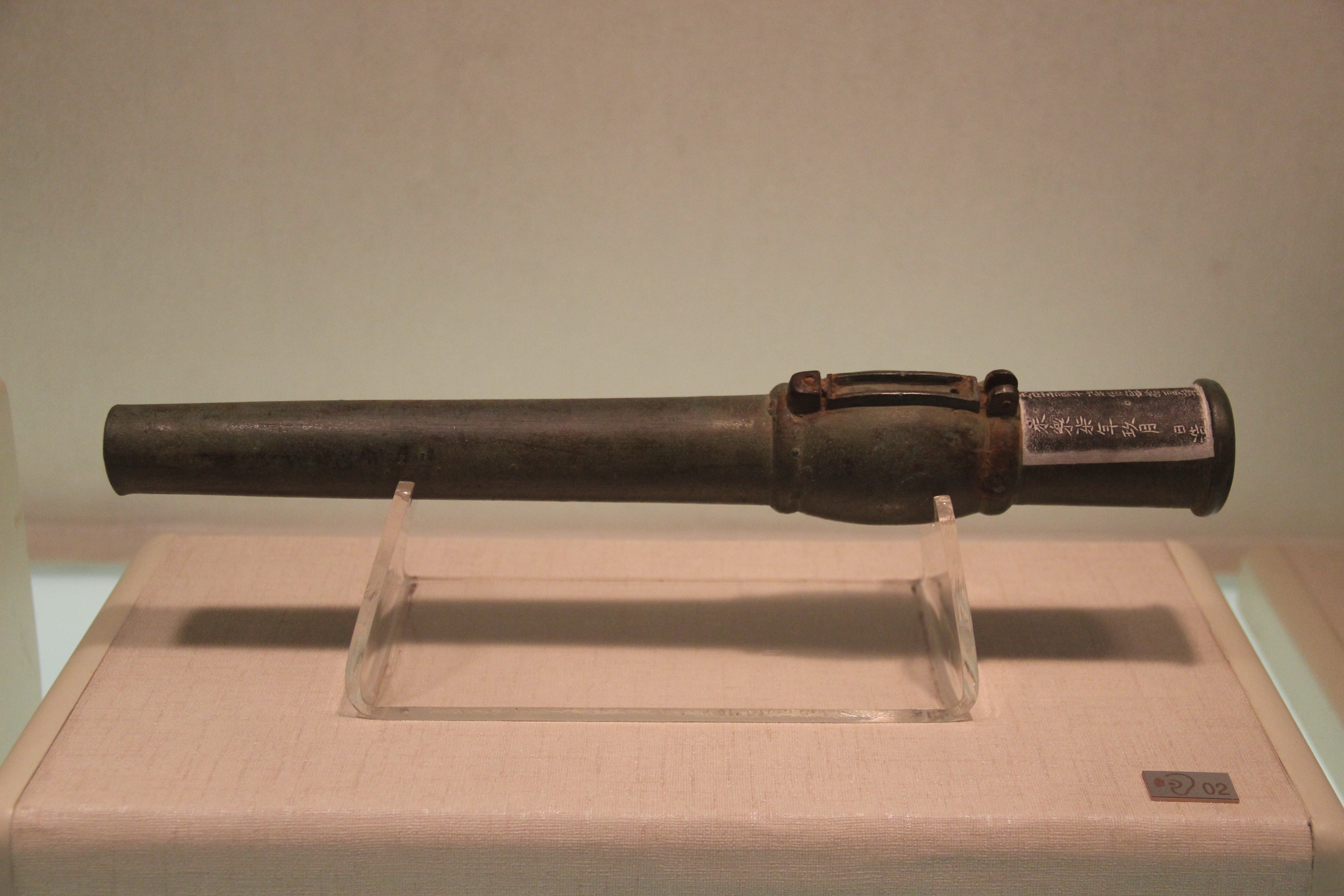
A Ming hand cannon, 1409. Liaoning Museum, Shenyang

The eunuch Wang Zhen, who held considerable influence at the Ming court, persuaded Emperor Yingzong (r. 1435–1449) to personally lead an army of 500,000 against the Oirats. In August, as the Ming army reached Datong, it received news that Ming forces on the frontier had suffered a series of defeats. Rather than continue the campaign, Wang ordered a withdrawal. When the army reached Tumu post station, it was surrounded by the Oirats. After several days of fighting, the Ming army was annihilated on 1 September; Wang and many senior commanders were killed, while Emperor Yingzong was captured alive. This event became known as the Tumu Crisis.

Empress Dowager Sun, the mother of Emperor Yingzong, appointed his younger brother, Zhu Qiyu, Prince of Cheng, as regent and convened court officials to discuss a response to the crisis on 4 September. The Ming court at first was inclined to follow the counsel of Xu Youzhen, an official who suggested that since the garrison forces around Beijing, the Ming capital, were less than 100,000, the court should retreat south to Nanjing, the secondary capital, while things were still in balance. This was following the example of when the Song dynasty moved to Hangzhou after the Jurchen-led Jin dynasty captured its capital of Kaifeng in 1127. However, Vice Minister of War Yu Qian rejected this proposal and said those who advocated retreat should be executed. Supported by influential eunuchs and ministers, Yu prevailed, and the Ming began preparations to resist the approaching Oirat army.

On 22 September, the Prince of Cheng ascended the throne as the Jingtai Emperor (r. 1449–1457). With the Ming having installed a new emperor, Esen was no longer able to use the captured Emperor Yingzong as leverage in negotiations. Therefore, his chieftains agreed to move forward to invading Beijing with the claim of wanting to restore Emperor Yingzong to power.

Yu Qian was promoted to minister of war after already organizing Beijing's defenses. Yu believed that a major reason for the defeat in the Tumu Crisis was poor logistics and lack of supplies. Large granaries were set up and the logistic network was reworked. Reserve forces from neighboring provinces such as Shanxi, Shandong and Henan were mobilized to defend the capital and weapon manufacturing was significantly increased. By the time of the battle, Beijing had a force of around 220,000 soldiers ready.

== Battle ==
Esen and his forces advanced toward Beijing, first attacking Datong on 17 October. They brought the captured Emperor Yingzong to the city gates and declared that they had come to restore him to the throne, but the defenders ignored their demands. He eventually abandoned plans to attack Beijing through the Juyong Pass and instead advanced through the Zijing Pass, southwest of Beijing. Although the defenders delayed the Oirat advance for several days, they eventually broke through. By 27 October, Esen had reached Beijing at the head of an army of 70,000.

Map of Beijing during the Ming dynasty, showing key locations and city gates, including Deshengmen and Xizhimen, which were attacked by the Oirats; the Outer City wall was not built until 1553.

Esen once again tried his diplomatic approach but was rebuffed by Ming forces. He then invited the Ming court to send leading officials to escort Emperor Yingzong back to the capital, hoping to take more high-ranking hostages; however, the ploy failed when the court sent only two low-ranking officers. Military operations began. On 29 October, the Oirats attacked Deshengmen, where Yu Qian had ordered General Shi Heng to prepare an ambush in nearby buildings. After Ming cavalry feigned a retreat to lure the Oirat forces forward, they were met with concentrated firearm volleys and flank attacks from concealed troops. During the engagement, Esen’s younger brother was killed. The Oirats shifted their offensive to Xizhimen but were repulsed by Sun Tang’s forces, who were bolstered by reinforcements from Shi Heng.

On 30 October, the Oirats attacked the earthen wall at Zhangyimen (present-day Guang'anmen). Although Ming generals Wu Xing, Wang Jing, and Wang Yong initially repulsed the vanguard using bows, firearms, and melee weapons, the formation was thrown into chaos when several hundred mounted eunuchs charged forward in an unauthorized attempt to claim military glory. In the ensuing disorder, Wu Xing was killed and the Oirats counterattacked, pursuing the Ming forces back to the city wall. The tide only turned when local residents began hurling stones and bricks from rooftops, allowing arriving reinforcements to drive the Oirats back once more. After a five-day siege, Esen recognized that his forces were outnumbered and that reinforcements had been blocked at Juyong Pass, (Note: The Oirat reinforcements of 50,000 attacked Juyong Pass. Ming forces took advantage of the freezing weather and used water to ice over the city walls, preventing the Oirat troops from advancing. After seven days of fighting, the Oirats suffered heavy casualties.) prompting his withdrawal from Beijing on 31 October.

== Aftermath ==
Esen continued attempting to use Emperor Yingzong to negotiate with the Ming court but to no avail as the new emperor was gaining power and had no intention of giving it back to his brother. Esen released the captured emperor in 1450. This was because he saw no advantage keeping him any longer and the Mongol economy relied on their trade with the Ming dynasty so Esen was obligated to reopen negotiations. Upon Emperor Yingzong's return, the Jingtai Emperor feared for the security of his throne and ordered him to remain in the Southern Palace within the Forbidden City, limiting his contact with the outside world. Emperor Yingzong was placed under house arrest.

Esen faced criticism for his failure to capitalize his initial victory over the Ming. Instead of securing better terms, he was ultimately forced to accept less favorable ones in exchange for the resumption of trade with the Ming. Following his self-proclamation as Khan in 1453, Esen faced internal strife; he was assassinated by his own men two years later.

In 1457, Emperor Yingzong launched a palace coup and regained the throne (r. 1457–1464). Yu Qian was then falsely accused of treason and sentenced to death. Nine years later, Yu was posthumously rehabilitated by the Chenghua Emperor.
