= Jin Ying (eunuch) =

15th-century Chinese eunuch

Jin Ying (Note: Chinese: 金英; pinyin: Jīn Yīng) (fl. 1425–1450) was a Chinese eunuch who served during the reigns of the Ming emperors Xuande, Yingzong, and Jingtai. He held several senior court appointments and played a role in both judicial administration and major political events of the mid-15th century. During the Tumu Crisis of 1449, he supported Yu Qian in opposing proposals to relocate the capital and backed the Defense of Beijing following the capture of Emperor Yingzong by the Oirat Mongols. After the Emperor's capture, his younger brother ascended the throne as the Jingtai Emperor, under whom Jin Ying retained influence. His opposition to altering the line of succession, however, contributed to his loss of favor, and he was later imprisoned on corruption charges before receiving an imperial pardon.

== Biography ==
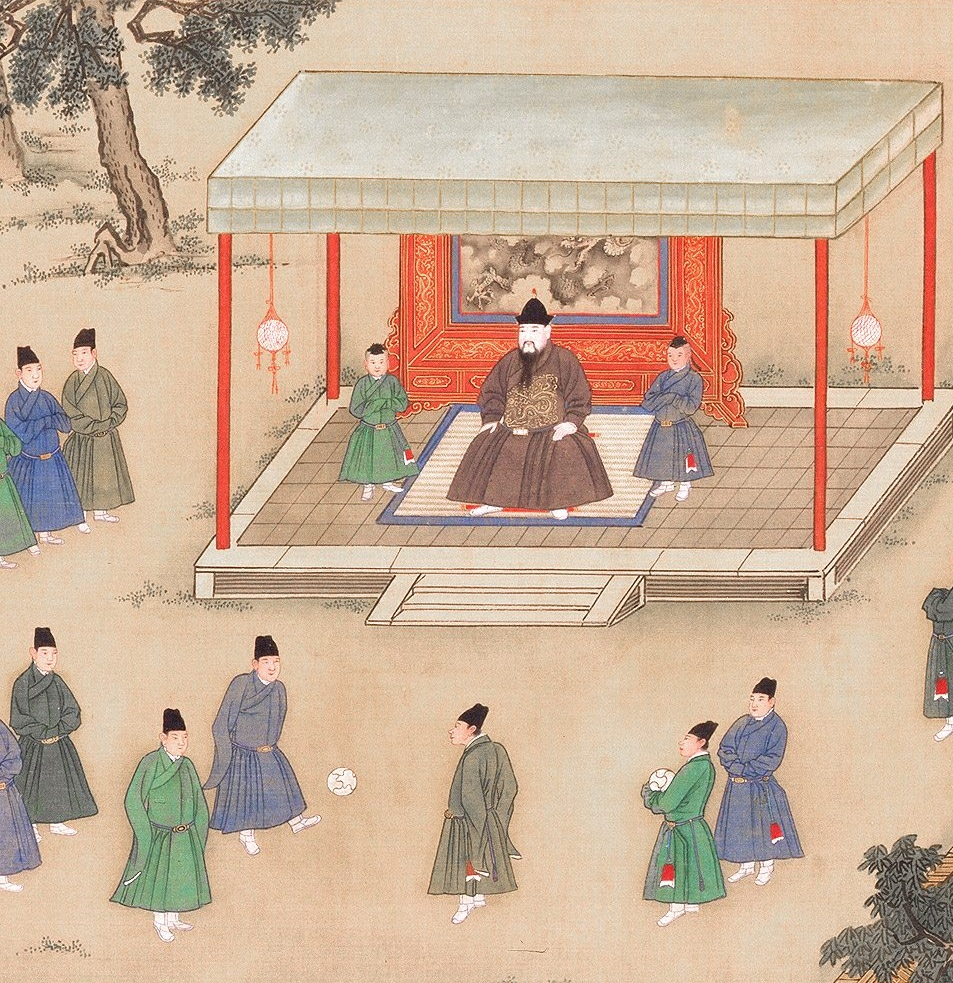
Court eunuchs playing cuju, observed by the Xuande Emperor

Little is known about Jin Ying's early life or when he entered imperial service as a eunuch during China's Ming dynasty. During the early years of the Xuande Emperor's reign (r. 1425–1435), several grand eunuchs who had served under the Yongle Emperor (r. 1402–1424) were executed on charges of real or fabricated crimes. The Xuande Emperor, however, soon recognized the importance of eunuchs to the exercise of imperial authority. Jin Ying was appointed grand commandant of Nanjing, further underscoring the importance of the eunuch office in the Ming's auxiliary capital. In the first reign of Emperor Yingzong (r. 1435–1449), he took the post of Director of Ceremonial.

In the summer of 1449, a prolonged drought occurred across the empire. Yu Shiyue, chief minister of the Court of Judicial Review, petitioned the Emperor, arguing that the drought might have been caused by injustices in the criminal justice system and recommending the appointment of special commissioners to review cases. Jin Ying was subsequently appointed as a judicial review commissioner. He presided over judicial proceedings, seated centrally on a platform before the Court of Judicial Review—with officials from the Ministry of Justice and the Censorate positioned on either side—and responded when corroboration was requested.

In July 1449, the Oirat Mongols under Esen launched a full-scale invasion of China, and Emperor Yingzong personally led a campaign against them. The campaign ended in disaster when the Ming army was defeated and the Emperor was captured on 1 September at Tumu post station, an event known as the Tumu Crisis. When news of the defeat reached Beijing, it caused panic among court officials, as the capital had insufficient forces to resist the advancing Mongols. Reader-in-waiting Xu Cheng suggested relocating the capital to the south. This proposal was firmly rejected by Yu Qian, the vice minister of war, who was supported by eunuchs including Jin Ying. The Emperor's younger brother, Zhu Qiyu, was then appointed regent and, together with Yu, who was subsequently appointed minister of war, organized the Defense of the Capital and repelled the Mongols. Zhu Qiyu ascended the throne as the Jingtai Emperor.

In 1450, the Jingtai Emperor sought to depose the heir apparent, the son of the Emperor Yingzong who had been appointed during the 1449 crisis, and replace him with his own son. He tested his officials on the matter and consulted Jin Ying. Jin Ying's response supported the legitimacy of the existing heir apparent, which displeased the Emperor, as he had intended to elevate his own son.

Jin Ying's career declined thereafter. His servants were accused of accepting bribes from salt merchants and of helping secure the promotion of an Imperial Guard officer through his influence, while Jin Ying himself was also accused of corruption. In November 1450, Jin Ying was imprisoned and sentenced to death, but was pardoned by the Emperor. The servants involved, however, were executed.
