= Jingtai Emperor =

Emperor of China from 1449 to 1457

Jingtai Emperor 景泰帝

Emperor of the Ming dynasty
- Reign: 22 September 1449 – 11 February 1457
- Enthronement: 22 September 1449
- Predecessor: Emperor Yingzong
- Successor: Emperor Yingzong
- Emperor Emeritus: Emperor Yingzong
- Born: 21 September 1428
- Died: 14 March 1457 (aged 28)
- Burial: Jingtai Mausoleum, Beijing
- Consorts: Empress Xiaoyuanjing (m. 1449; dep. 1452); Empress Suxiao (died 1456)
Era dates
- Jingtai: (Note: Chinese: 景泰; pinyin: Jǐngtài) 14 January 1450 – 11 February 1457
Posthumous name
- Prince Li of Cheng (Note: Chinese: 郕戾王) (initially); Emperor Gongren Kangding Jing (Note: Chinese: 恭仁康定景皇帝 (conferred by the Chenghua Emperor in 1475)); Emperor Futian Jiandao Gongren Kangding Longwen Buwu Xiande Chongxiao Jing (Note: Simplified Chinese: 符天建道恭仁康定隆文布武显德崇孝景皇帝; traditional Chinese: 符天建道恭仁康定隆文布武顯德崇孝景皇帝 (conferred by the Hongguang Emperor in 1644))
Temple name
- Daizong (Note: Chinese: 代宗; pinyin: Dàizōng (conferred by the Hongguang Emperor in 1644))
- House: Zhu
- Dynasty: Ming
- Father: Xuande Emperor
- Mother: Lady Wu

Chinese name
- Chinese: 景泰帝
Transcriptions
Standard Mandarin
- Hanyu Pinyin: Jǐngtài Dì
- Wade–Giles: Ching^{3}-tʻai^{4} Ti^{4}
- IPA: [tɕìŋ.tʰâɪ tî]

The Jingtai Emperor (21 September 1428 – 14 March 1457), personal name Zhu Qiyu, (Note: Simplified Chinese: 朱祁钰; traditional Chinese: 朱祁鈺; pinyin: Zhū Qíyù) was the seventh emperor of the Ming dynasty of China, reigning from 1449 to 1457. He succeeded his elder brother, Emperor Yingzong.

In 1449, Emperor Yingzong personally led the army to battle against the Mongolian army of Esen Taishi. He left Zhu Qiyu in charge of government affairs. However, in the Battle of Tumu Fortress, the Mongols defeated the Ming army and captured the Emperor. This event caused shock and concern throughout the country, and the court eventually elevated Zhu Qiyu to the throne. The former emperor, who had formed a positive relationship with Esen, was released in 1450 but did not regain his position. He was instead placed under house arrest in the Southern Palace of the Forbidden City.

During his reign, the Jingtai Emperor, with the support of Minister Yu Qian, worked to restore the country's infrastructure. This included repairing the Grand Canal and the Yellow River's dam system, resulting in economic prosperity and a bolstering of the country's strength. After ruling for eight years, the Emperor fell ill and his death was imminent in early 1457. He had not designated an heir after his son had died in the fourth year of his reign. In February 1457, a group of officials overthrew the Jingtai Emperor in a palace coup, restoring Emperor Yingzong to the throne. The Jingtai Emperor died a month later.

== Early life ==
Zhu Qiyu, the future Jingtai Emperor, was born on 11 September 1428. He was the second son of the Xuande Emperor, who ruled the Ming dynasty of China from 1425 to 1435. His mother, Lady Wu, was one of the Emperor's concubines. When the Xuande Emperor died in 1435, his eldest son, Emperor Yingzong, became the new ruler of the Ming and made Zhu Qiyu the Prince of Cheng (郕王).

Zhu Qiyu and Emperor Yingzong were reputedly on friendly terms. Emperor Yingzong allowed Zhu Qiyu to postpone leaving the court and taking up residence in his fief in present-day Wenshang County in Shandong. According to historian Wolfgang Franke, the prince was shy and indecisive by nature and had no desire for power.

== Ascension ==
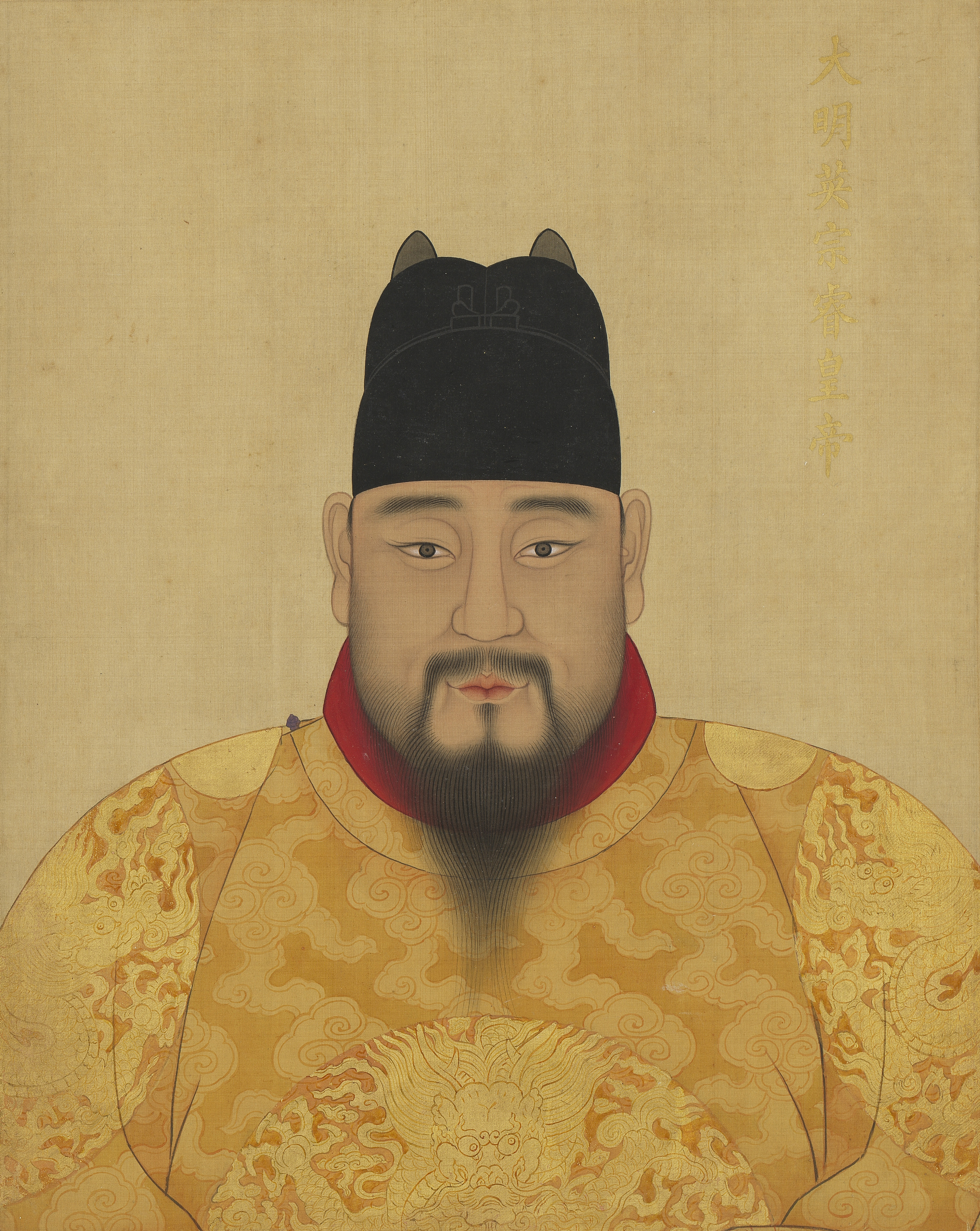
Emperor Yingzong, the brother and predecessor of the Jingtai Emperor

Beginning in 1449, there was growing unrest along the northern border of the Ming dynasty. In late July, reports reached Beijing that the Mongols, under the leadership of their de facto ruler Esen, had launched an attack on Datong as part of a massive invasion. With the support of his eunuch advisor Wang Zhen, Emperor Yingzong decided to personally lead the campaign against the Mongols, and on 3 August he appointed Zhu Qiyu as the provisional administrator of Beijing. The prince was assisted by representatives of the most influential power groups at court. Prince Consort Jiao Jing (焦敬) represented the imperial family. Director of Ceremonial Jin Ying, the highest-ranking eunuch in the absence of Wang Zhen, led the palace eunuchs. Minister of Personnel Wang Zhi (王直) represented the government, and Grand Secretary Gao Gu (高穀) was the fourth aide. All major decisions were to be postponed until the Emperor's return. On 4 August, Emperor Yingzong led an army against the Mongols, but the month-long campaign achieved little. During the retreat, Mongol forces ambushed and routed his army at Tumu on 1 September, killing numerous senior commanders and capturing the Emperor.

With the approval of Empress Dowager Sun, Emperor Yingzong's mother, Zhu Qiyu assumed control of the government on 4 September, but the Empress Dowager made it clear that Zhu Qiyu's authority was temporary. On 6 September, she named Emperor Yingzong's eldest son, the two-year-old Zhu Jianshen, as heir to the throne. Nine days later, high-ranking civil and military officials led by Vice Minister of War Yu Qian petitioned Empress Dowager Sun to install Zhu Qiyu as emperor to stabilize the government amid the political turmoil following the Tumu disaster and the imminent Oirat advance toward the capital. As the only adult relative of the captured emperor, Zhu Qiyu was seen as a natural choice. Initially, Zhu Qiyu rejected the proposal, but those around him saw this as a formality and he eventually accepted. On 17 (or possibly 22 or 23) September, he ascended the throne and adopted the era name Jingtai, which means "bright exhalation". He declared Emperor Yingzong Taishang Huang (太上皇; 'Emperor Emeritus'), a title of superior rank but without governing authority. Only one official objected to the new emperor's accession and was punished with death. The new emperor's immediate concern was the defense of the capital. Yu, who had just become minister of war, took charge of organizing the defense of Beijing.

After their victory at Tumu, the Mongols did not immediately launch an attack on Beijing. Instead, they hesitated and allowed the Ming dynasty two months to recover. The Mongols laid siege to Beijing on 27 October, but abandoned the siege four days later after realizing that victory was unattainable. The Jingtai Emperor's government refused all of Esen's attempts to pay for the release of Emperor Yingzong and insisted on his unconditional return. Emperor Yingzong became a burden to the Mongols, who eventually released him without conditions in late 1450. The Jingtai Emperor was deeply suspicious of his brother, fearing that he might reclaim the throne, and supported a firm policy of resistance against the Oirat partly out of concern that Esen would restore his brother to power. He confined his brother to the Southern Palace, southeast of the imperial palace, and tried to isolate him from senior officials.

== Government ==
=== Ministers, eunuchs and grand secretaries ===
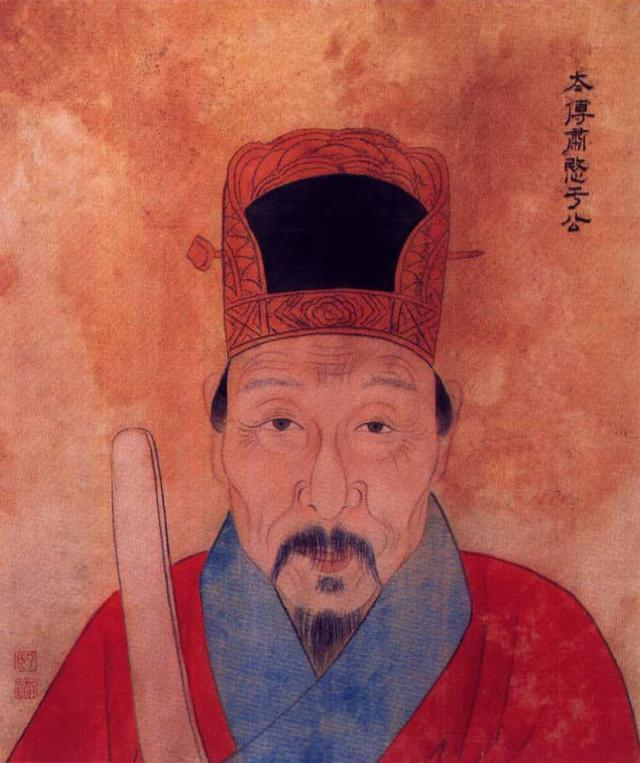
17th-century portrait of Yu Qian, the most important minister of the Jingtai Emperor's government

Traditional historians have praised the Jingtai Emperor's government, particularly in contrast to the mismanagement of state affairs by corrupt and incompetent eunuchs during the preceding decade. However, his reign did not simply mark a transition from eunuch rule to the restoration of officialdom's power. During the early years of the Jingtai era, eunuchs and officials alike supported reforms to revitalize the state, reflecting a broader sense of national renewal following the crisis of 1449.

To some extent, the Jingtai Emperor's regime followed the tradition of the three grand secretaries (Note: Yang Rong, Yang Pu, and Yang Shiqi) who managed the empire from the mid-1420s to the early 1440s. Wang Zhi embodied this continuity, holding the position of minister of personnel from 1443 to 1457. During the 1440s, Wang Zhi was a constant opponent of Wang Zhen. After 1449, he began cooperating with Yu. He was assisted in his duties by two successive co-ministers: He Wenyuan (1451–1453) and Wang Ao (1453–1457). Yu supported the rise of Wang Ao, who had been a highly successful defense commissioner, first of Liaodong and later of Guangdong and Guangxi. Wang remained minister of personnel until his death in 1467. (Note: The widely respected ministers of personnel, along with their careful selection of capable officials, contributed to a high level of administration in the third quarter of the fifteenth century.)

One notable characteristic of the Jingtai Emperor's reign was the remarkable stability within his core group of ministers. The heads of the Six Ministries largely retained their positions throughout his reign. Yu Qian headed the Ministry of War, Jin Lian (金濂) the Ministry of Revenue, Hu Ying (胡濙) the Ministry of Rites, Yu Shiyue (俞士悅) the Ministry of Justice, and Shi Pu (石璞) the Ministry of Works. Similarly, the leadership of the Censorate remained constant from 1445 to 1454, with Chen Yi (陳鎰), followed by Yang Shan (楊善), Wang Wen (王文), Xiao Weizhen (蕭維禎), and Li Shi (李實). Additionally, the influential army commander Shi Heng (石亨) and the powerful eunuchs Cao Jixiang (曹吉祥) and Liu Yongcheng (劉永誠) also retained their positions throughout this time.

Although Wang Zhen had died during the Tumu Crisis and his actions had been widely condemned in 1449–1450, eunuchs continued to wield considerable influence under the Jingtai Emperor. Among those who supported Yu Qian during the defense of Beijing were the eunuchs Jin Ying and Xing An. Jin had wielded considerable influence in the 1430s but eventually lost power to Wang Zhen. Following the Jingtai Emperor's accession, Jin was appointed Director of Ceremonial but was imprisoned in 1450 for supporting Emperor Yingzong's return from Oirat captivity, and Xing succeeded him as head of the eunuchs. (Note: Xing An also played an important role in negotiating Emperor Yingzong's return and, later, in the change of the heir apparent in 1452.) Eunuch influence also extended into the military, particularly through Cao Jixiang and Liu Yongcheng.

The unity of the Jingtai Emperor's regime proved short-lived, as Emperor Yingzong's continued confinement in the Southern Palace remained a source of political tension at court. The grand secretaries Chen Xun (陳循) and Gao Gu did not support the Jingtai Emperor. In 1451–1452, Yu Qian, the most influential figure in the government, clashed with Shi Heng after accusing him and his family of abusing their power and engaging in corruption. The Emperor refused both men's resignations. In 1454–1455, Yu fell seriously ill and never fully recovered his personal drive.

=== Military reforms ===
The Tumu disaster made a thorough reorganization of the Ming army urgent. After establishing Beijing as the imperial capital, the Yongle Emperor (r. 1402–1424) gathered combat troops from garrisons across the empire into the Beijing area, forming the Three Great Camps for infantry, cavalry, and firearms. These camps supplied the core of his campaign armies, and the armies raised for later imperial expeditions were always drawn from the same troops. The army that Emperor Yingzong led against Esen, and which was destroyed at Tumu in 1449, was likewise made up of soldiers from these camps.

In 1451, once the immediate danger had passed, Yu introduced a series of military reforms. He handpicked 100,000 soldiers from the remaining troops in the Beijing area and divided them into five training divisions (團營; tuanying). In 1452, he added an additional 50,000 soldiers and created ten training units. He also restructured the command system of the capital garrison. Control of the garrisons had formerly been divided between generals and eunuchs, with each of the camps operating independently under its own field commander, and there was little coordination between detachments from different camps. Yu placed each camp under one field commander and the entire garrison under the field marshal. He also removed the eunuchs from their supervisory role, resulting in a unified command and a greater involvement of the capital generals in managing the training camps. This new command arrangement for the capital garrison was unique among the various Ming command systems, as the generals in charge of training also commanded the same soldiers in battle. The eunuch generals Cao Jixiang, who had fought in the Luchuan campaigns and against the Fujian rebels in the 1440s, and Liu Yongcheng, who had long served on the northern frontier, both also played important roles in the reform of military organization in 1453.

=== Natural disasters ===
In 1450, Shandong experienced a famine, and from 1452 to 1454, heavy rains and cold weather beset the provinces in northern China and the lower Yangtze River. A widespread drought struck several regions across northern and southern China in 1455. The following year, excessive rainfall damaged crops in the Northern and Southern Metropolitan Regions, Shandong, and Henan, while the Yangtze Valley, Zhejiang, and Jiangxi suffered severe drought. The state treasury was depleted due to providing aid to the population and dealing with tax arrears. In 1453, the government lifted the ban on using coins in private trade, which had been reinstated in 1447 to support the value of paper money. From the mid-1450s, illegal private coins from Jiangnan began to dominate the markets in Beijing, replacing the old Yongle coins. Although there were proposals to resume state production of coins, they were disregarded, resulting in the spread of illegal mints through unofficial networks.

After severe floods from the Yellow River and changes in its course in 1448, the government took urgent action to regulate the river. The river began to flow into the sea both north and south of the Shandong Peninsula, but these changes in its flow caused problems with the water supply for the Grand Canal. Despite repairs carried out from 1449 to 1452, attempts to fix the issue were ultimately unsuccessful. In 1453, the official Xu Youzhen, who had lost favor in 1449 after proposing to move the capital from Beijing to Nanjing, presented a plan to rebuild the levees and canals. With a workforce of 58,000, he completed complex repairs to the dams and excavated hundreds of kilometers of canals within two years. His work successfully withstood the great flood of 1456 and remained in use for decades. The Jingtai era also witnessed the restoration of stability due to the efforts of capable ministers. In the field of culture, the era is known for the advancement of wire enamel (cloisonné) decoration, which is now referred to as Jingtai-lan (景泰藍; 'blue Jingtai') in Chinese.

=== Popular unrest ===
Traditional history portrays the 1450s as a time of intense competition between two imperial brothers, but Marxist historians emphasize the presence of class conflicts. The population was consistently dissatisfied, leading to rebellions and keeping the army occupied for much of the decade. By 1452, the uprisings in Fujian and Zhejiang had subsided. In Guangdong and Guangxi, long troubled by banditry and local unrest among non-Han populations, specifically the Miao and Yao tribes, went unchecked until Wang Ao was sent to the region in 1452–1453. In 1450–52, the Miao and Yao rebelled in Guizhou and Huguang, and unrest continued in Fujian, Huguang, Sichuan, and Zhejiang in the years 1453–56. Throughout the 1450s, there were armed conflicts in Guangdong, where the authorities mobilized loyal tribes against the rebels. The unrest of the decade was mostly confined to the non-Han frontier regions of the south, and consisted of two distinct types: uprisings by impoverished Han peasants and miners, and uprisings by minority peoples. There is little evidence of widespread dissidence in the densely populated areas of northern and central China, even though the Jingtai era saw serious natural disasters.

== Succession problems, deposition and death ==
A persistent political problem during the Jingtai Emperor's reign was the fate of the deposed Emperor Yingzong and the question of succession. Although Emperor Yingzong was kept in isolation, he still had supporters in the government, such as Minister of Rites Hu Ying. The Jingtai Emperor took no steps to eliminate his rivals, as his predecessors had usually done in similar situations.

Emperor Yingzong's eldest son, Zhu Jianshen, was the heir since 1449, but the Jingtai Emperor decided to reserve the throne for his own descendants. Through a combination of bribery and intimidation, he won enough support among court officials for his plan. On 20 May 1452, despite opposition from the grand secretaries and other officials, he appointed his son Zhu Jianji (朱見濟) as the new heir, Zhu Jianshen as Prince of Yi (沂王), and Zhu Jianji's mother, Lady Hang, as the new empress, deposing Empress Wang. This move, which appeared to prioritize personal interests, weakened the Emperor's reputation.

Zhu Jianji died in 1453 and Lady Hang in 1456. As the Emperor had no other son, a new heir was not chosen. Some officials, including Zhang Lun (章綸; d. 1483), Director of the Ministry of Rites, and Zhong Tong (鍾同; d. 1455), a censor, suggested reinstating Zhu Jianshen, but they were imprisoned for their suggestion. Zhong and others were even flogged to death. This event prompted ambitious courtiers and government officials to plot to overthrow the Jingtai Emperor and reinstate his brother.

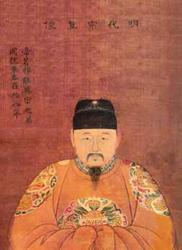
After regaining the throne, Emperor Yingzong denied the legitimacy of the Jingtai Emperor. No official portrait of the Jingtai Emperor survived. This portrait, The Portrait of Emperor Daizong of Ming, was created during the Qing dynasty, long after his death.

The plot was orchestrated by the generals Shi Heng and Zhang Yue (張軏; 1393–1458), the official Xu Youzhen, and the eunuch-general Cao Jixiang. They saw an opportunity when the Emperor fell ill at the end of 1456, causing him to cancel audiences and New Year ceremonies in 1457. The Emperor refused to appoint a successor, and the court was filled with anxiety as they prepared for his death. On the morning of 11 February 1457, the conspirators forcefully removed Emperor Yingzong from his residence and placed him on the throne, surprising officials who had come for the morning audience. Emperor Yingzong wasted no time in making changes to the government, promoting the conspirators and dismissing officials from the previous regime. Some supporters of the Jingtai regime, including Yu Qian, Wang Wen, and three high-ranking eunuchs, were executed. Yu's military reforms were also reversed.

Empress Dowager Sun demoted the Jingtai Emperor to his former title Prince of Cheng on 24 February, and the former emperor never fully recovered from his illness. He died on 14 March 1457. Some sources claim that he was murdered. (Note: Lu Yi (陸釴; 1439–1489) was the first person to claim that the Jingtai Emperor was murdered. A Hanlin academician, Lu served as an editor of the Veritable Records of Yingzong and also taught at the palace school for selected eunuchs. According to his personal records, the eunuch Jiang An (蔣安) strangled the Jingtai Emperor to death. The same account appears in Tan Qian's Guoque (國榷) and Zha Jizuo's Zuiweilu (罪惟錄). The latter adds that the former emperor was murdered after he had recovered from the illness that had been one of the causes of his deposition.) His death was recorded with the term hong (薨), used for the death of a prince, rather than beng (崩), used for the death of an emperor. Emperor Yingzong gave him the posthumous name Li (戾), meaning "reprehensible", (Note: The Jingtai Emperor was granted neither a full posthumous name nor a temple name. A posthumous name was a long honorific, sometimes as many as twenty-one characters, that praised an emperor's virtues in idealized terms, while a temple name was a two-character title conferred on an emperor after his death.) and buried him outside the imperial mausoleums, at Yuquanshan. Some officials suggested abolishing his era name, similar to the abolishment of the Jianwen era in 1402, but Emperor Yingzong did not agree. After the Jingtai Emperor's death, his concubines were ordered to commit suicide. His former empress, Lady Wang, was allowed to continue living outside the palace. According to Wolfgang Franke, she was protected by her nephew Zhu Jianshen, Emperor Yingzong's son and the future Chenghua Emperor. Emperor Yingzong, however, had her house searched and seized 200,000 liang of silver and other treasures. Lady Wang died in January 1507. She was given the posthumous name Empress Zhenhui Jing (真惠景皇后) and buried in her husband's mausoleum.

== Legacy ==
The proclamation issued at Emperor Yingzong's restoration denied the legitimacy of the Jingtai Emperor's reign, presented his return as the will of Heaven, and claimed that his own rule had been continuous since his first reign. However, the Jingtai Emperor's reign was largely rehabilitated in the mid and late Ming eras. In 1475, the Chenghua Emperor restored the Jingtai Emperor's imperial title and bestowed the posthumous name Emperor Gongren Kangding Jing (恭仁康定景皇帝), which was shorter than the names given to other emperors. The Jingtai Emperor's rehabilitation continued under the Southern Ming (1644–1662), when the Hongguang Emperor gave him the temple name Daizong (代宗; "Surrogate Ancestor") and a full posthumous name, Emperor Futian Jiandao Gongren Kangding Longwen Buwu Xiande Chongxiao Jing (符天建道恭仁康定隆文布武顯德崇孝景皇帝). He continued to be viewed favorably well into the Qing dynasty (1644–1911), as reflected in the History of Ming, the official history of the Ming dynasty compiled by the Qing court.

The High Qing era poet Yuan Mei was struck by the contrast between the two crises: the Ming survived the crisis of 1449, whereas the Northern Song had collapsed after the Jingkang incident of 1127. He credited the recovery to the Jingtai Emperor rather than to Yu Qian, arguing that Yu was able to contribute only because the Emperor had chosen to employ him. The Qianlong Emperor of the Qing took a middle view. In 1796 he ordered a stele set up at the Jingtai Emperor's tomb, with an inscription he composed himself. It acknowledged that the Jingtai Emperor had employed Yu Qian and defended the dynasty, but faulted his treatment of Emperor Yingzong and his handling of the succession. Historian Aaron Throness has analyzed these judgments as a clash between ritual and function. The "ritual camp" saw the Jingtai Emperor's irregular accession in 1449, his confinement of his elder brother, and his replacement of the heir apparent as serious moral violations, and often attacked his personal conduct. The "function camp" held that his role in stabilizing the dynasty after the Tumu Crisis, as well as his administrative successes, justified overlooking the ritual infractions he committed. Throness links this willingness to the loosening of state control over historical writing from the mid-15th century, and to the later growth of private historiography. Private histories and collections of memorials to the throne were published in large numbers, and by the late 16th century copies of the Veritable Records, once closed to the public, were circulating widely.

== Family ==
- Empress Xiaoyuanjing (孝淵景皇后) of the Wang clan (汪氏; 1427–1507)
  - Princess Gu'an (固安郡主), first daughter. Married in 1469 to Wang Xian (王憲; d. 28 December 1514). (Note: The History of Ming contains conflicting information regarding the number of daughters born to the Jingtai Emperor. Volume 113, in the biography of Empress Wang, states she bore him two daughters, while volume 121, in the biography of the princesses, records that he had only one daughter.)
- Empress Suxiao (肅孝皇后) of the Hang clan (杭氏; d. 1456)
  - Zhu Jianji (朱見濟), Crown Prince Huaixian (懷獻皇太子; 1445–1453), first son
- Imperial Noble Consort (皇貴妃) of the Tang clan (唐氏; 1438–1457)
- Li Xi'er (李惜儿)

== See also ==
- Chinese emperors family tree (late)

== Notes ==
Jingtai Emperor House of Zhu Born: 21 September 1428 Died: 14 March 1457
Regnal titles
Preceded by Emperor Yingzong (Zhengtong Emperor)	Emperor of the Ming dynasty 22 September 1449 – 11 February 1457	Succeeded by Emperor Yingzong (Tianshun Emperor)
Chinese royalty
New creation	Prince of Cheng (First tenure); 8 March 1435 – 22 September 1449	Merged into the Crown
Princedom recreated after his dethronement	Prince of Cheng (Second tenure); 24 February – 14 March 1457	Title abolished
