= Yu Shaobao cui zhong quanzhuan =

A page from chapter one of the novel

Title page of the novel

Yuan Shaobao cui zhong quanzhuan (traditional Chinese: 于少保萃忠全傳; simplified Chinese: 于少保萃忠全传) or Yu Qian quanzhuan, also translated into English as Loyalty of Guard Yu, is a classic Chinese novel written by Sun Gaoliang (孫高亮) around 1580s during the Ming dynasty. It is 40 chapters and is about the life of Yu Qian.
