= Three Great Camps =

The Three Great Camps, or Sandaying, (Note: Simplified Chinese: 三大营; traditional Chinese: 三大營; pinyin: Sāndàyíng) were training bases established by the Yongle Emperor of the Ming dynasty for the purpose of training infantry, cavalry, and artillery.

After returning from the second Mongol campaign in August 1414, the Yongle Emperor recognized the need to improve the quality of soldier training and thus established three metropolitan training camps (jingying) near Beijing. In 1415, he issued an order for all guards (wei) in the northern provinces and the Southern Metropolitan Region to send a portion of their troops to these camps for training. Each camp was led by a eunuch and two generals.

The Camp of the Five Armies, or Wujunying (五軍營), trained soldiers from provincial regiments, but their on-the-spot training was of little value due to the declining quality of soldiers from the inland garrisons. The camp was named after the five Chief Military Commissions that administered the empire's armies.

The Camp of Three Thousand, or Sanqianying (三千營), was named after the three thousand elite Mongol cavalry division, which served as the striking force of the Yongle Emperor's troops during the Jingnan campaign. This camp specialized in cavalry training, reconnaissance, patrolling, and communications.

The Artillery Camp, or Shenjiying (神機營), focused on training soldiers in the use of firearms. While firearms had been used by Chinese armies for centuries, their importance greatly increased during the conquest of Đại Việt (present-day northern Vietnam). Hồ Nguyên Trừng (1374–1446), the eldest son of Viet ruler Hồ Quý Ly, was captured early in the war and introduced the production of improved Viet muskets and explosive weapons in China. The camp included experts from Đại Việt who conducted firearms training under the supervision of eunuchs.

There was a fourth camp known as the Camp of the Four Guards (Siweiying), where soldiers from four specialized guard units trained horses for the army. This camp was also staffed by experienced Mongol horsemen, who played a crucial role in its operations.

In 1451, due to poor cooperation among units from different camps, each equipped with different types of weapons, Minister of War Yu Qian, introduced a reform. This reform abolished the Three Great Camps and replaced them with five (and later ten) mixed training camps under unified command. After Emperor Yingzong was restored to the throne and Yu was executed in 1457, the Three Great Camps were reinstated. In 1464, the Chenghua Emperor revived Yu's reform, dividing the forces into twelve divisions, but this system was also not permanent, and by the mid-16th century the three camps had been restored once again.
