= Michael Beheim =

German Meistersinger (1416-c.1472)

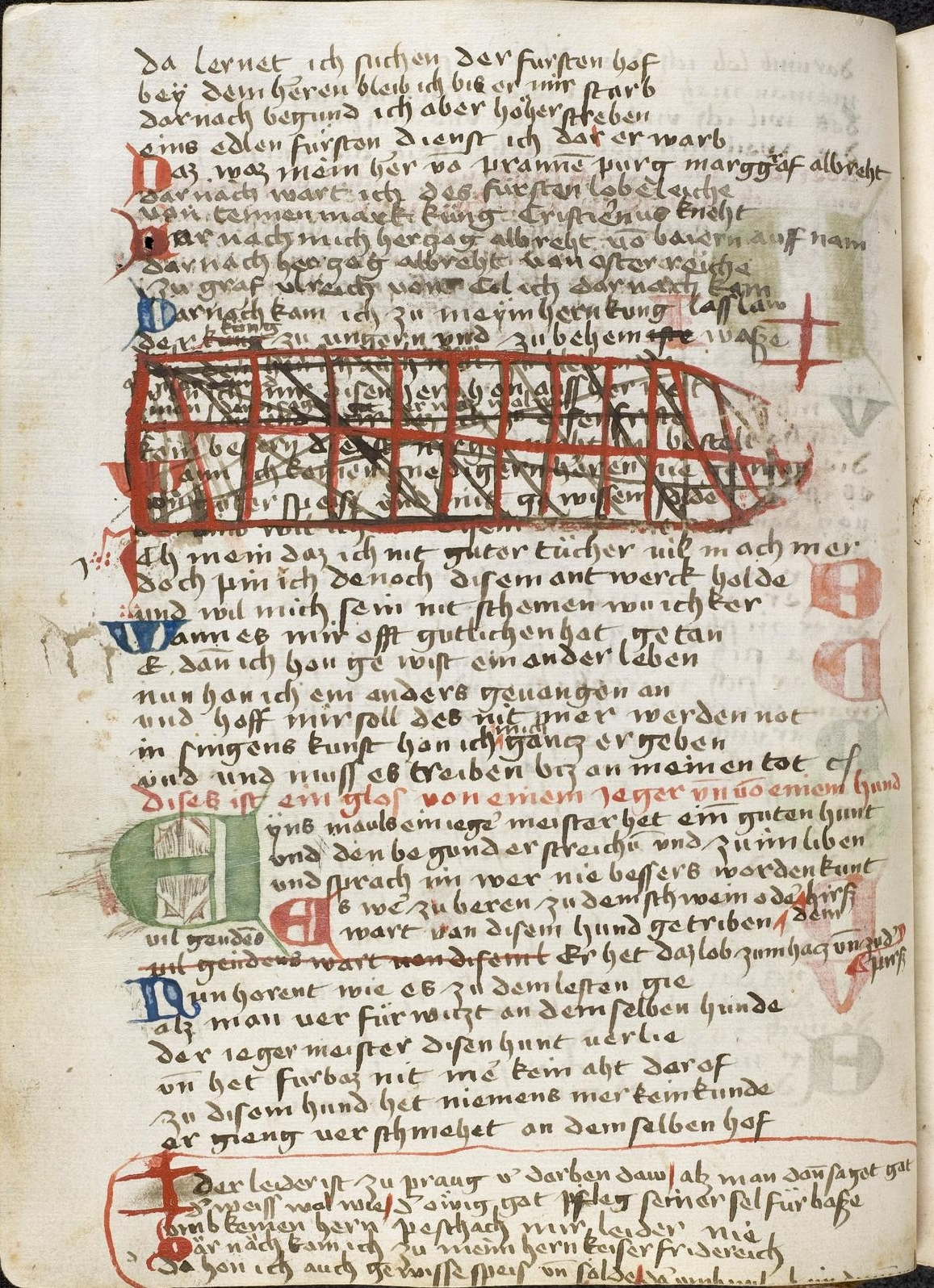
A song by Beheim from Heidelberg University Library, Cod. Pal. germ. 312, fol. 24v

Michael Beheim (also Michel Behaim, Beham or Behm, 1416 – c.1472) was a wandering singer from the modern-day German state Baden-Württemberg. He is an author of a number of songs and two versed chronicles, Buch von den Wienern and Das Leben Friedrichs I von der Pfalz.
