= Tumubao =

Fortress in Huailai County, Hebei, China

Coordinates: 40°22′48″N 115°36′27″E

Tumubao (Chinese: 土木堡; pinyin: Tǔmùbǎo), originally named Tongmocheng (統漠城), is a fortress located in Tumu Town, Huailai County, Zhangjiakou, Hebei province, China. It is situated on the inner side of the Great Wall, between Juyongguan and Datong, and is a part of the Great Wall defense system.

The Tumu Fortress is located 8 kilometers east of Huailai County. It is shaped like a ship and has a length of approximately 500 meters from north to south and 1000 meters from east to west. The walls of the fortress are about 6 to 7 meters high. Currently, only the south and west walls of the fortress remain. Originally, the walls were made of earth and bricks, but now only the earth walls remain. The modern town lies within the former fort.

During the Ming dynasty, Yulinbao (榆林堡), Tumubao, and Jimingbao (雞鳴堡) were the three major fortresses located in northern Beijing. In 1449, Emperor Yingzong of Ming led a campaign against the Oirats and was ultimately defeated and captured by their army at Tumubao, an event known in historiography as the Tumu Crisis. In 1457, after Emperor Yingzong was restored to the throne following the Duomen Coup, a Xianzhong Temple (顯忠祠) was built within the fortress to honor and commemorate the sacrifice of 20–30 Ming military officers during the Tumu Crisis.

== See also ==
- Ming Great Wall
