= Xu Youzhen =

Chinese official (1407–1472)

- 徐有貞

Senior Grand Secretary
- In office 1457
- Monarch: Yingzong
- Preceded by: Chen Xun
- Succeeded by: Xu Bin

Personal details
- Born: 1407 Suzhou
- Died: 23 August 1472 (aged 64–65) Suzhou
- Education: jinshi degree (1433)

Chinese name
- Traditional Chinese: 徐有貞
- Simplified Chinese: 徐有贞
Transcriptions
Standard Mandarin
- Hanyu Pinyin: Xú Yǒuzhēn

Xu Youzhen (Note: Xu Youzhen's courtesy name was Yuanyu (元玉)) (1407 – 23 August 1472) was a Chinese scholar-official, calligrapher, and writer during the Ming dynasty. In early 1457, he played a key role in organizing a coup that overthrew the Jingtai Emperor and reinstated Emperor Yingzong. He was then appointed as the head of the grand secretaries, but was later dismissed and sent into exile. He spent the rest of his life in his hometown of Suzhou.

== Biography ==
Xu Youzhen, originally named Xu Cheng (徐珵), was from Suzhou. He studied Confucianism with the goal of becoming a civil servant. After successfully passing the civil service examinations, he passed the final palace examination in 1433 and was awarded the rank of jinshi. He then served in lower positions in the civil service, where he gained recognition for his knowledge of military and strategic matters.

In 1449, during the Battle of Tumu, Emperor Yingzong was captured by the Mongols and held captive for a year before being returned to Beijing, where he was placed under house arrest with his family. In the midst of this crisis, Xu proposed relocating the capital to Nanjing, but his suggestion was deemed defeatist by Vice Minister of War Yu Qian. After the ascension of the new Jingtai Emperor, Yu, now minister of war, gained significant influence and Xu fell out of favor, hindering his chances for promotion. In 1453, Xu changed his name from Cheng to Youzhen in an attempt to improve his standing.

After the devastating floods and changes in the course of the Yellow River in 1448, regulating the river became a major challenge. At that time, the river flowed both north and south of the Shandong Peninsula, causing issues with the water supply for the Grand Canal. Despite attempts to fix the problem and repairs made between 1449 and 1452, they were ultimately unsuccessful. In 1453, Xu proposed a plan for new construction of dikes and canals. The government approved the plan and the Emperor appointed Xu as assistant censor-in-chief, entrusting him with its implementation. Under Xu's leadership, workers completed comprehensive repairs to the dikes and dug a 150 km long canal, redirecting the waters of the Yellow River into the Daqing River and ultimately into the sea. A total of 58,000 people were involved in the construction. The completed project successfully withstood the great flood of 1456 and remained in use for decades. As a reward for his efforts, Xu was promoted to vice censor-in-chief.

In early 1457, Xu was part of a group that freed former Emperor Yingzong from house arrest and restored him to the throne. He was then appointed as a member of the Grand Secretariat and became the senior grand secretary. He was also given the titles of minister of war and Count of Wugong. Xu played a role in eliminating the Jingtai Emperor's supporters, including the execution of Yu. In August 1457, however, he was dismissed from all positions, arrested, and exiled to Yunnan. He was allowed to return to Suzhou in 1460, where he lived until the end of his life.

Xu was known for his prolific writing and skilled calligraphy, particularly in conceptual script. His style was influenced by his grandson Zhu Yunming.
