= Tumu Crisis =

1449 Ming China-Oirat Mongols conflict

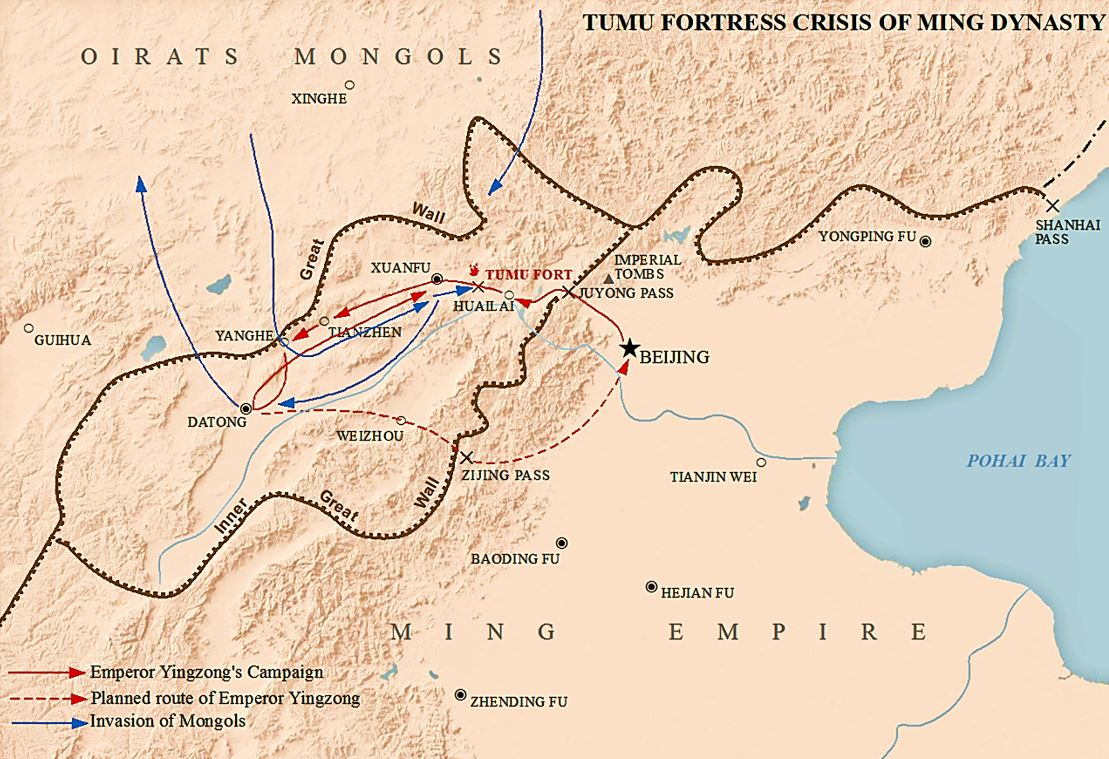
- Map showing the Tumu campaign, 1449
Date	1 September 1449
Location	Huailai County, North Zhili, Ming China 40°23′N 115°36′E
Result	Mongol victory

Belligerents
Oirat Mongols: Eastern Mongols; Uriankhai	Ming dynasty

Commanders and leaders
Esen Taishi; Toghtoa Bukha Khan	Emperor Yingzong (POW); Wang Zhen †

Strength
20,000	Unknown, but often estimated to be around 500,000

Chinese name
- Traditional Chinese: 土木之變
- Simplified Chinese: 土木之变
Transcriptions
Standard Mandarin
- Hanyu Pinyin: Tǔmù zhībiàn

Crisis of the Tumu Fortress
- Traditional Chinese: 土木堡之變
- Simplified Chinese: 土木堡之变
Transcriptions
Standard Mandarin
- Hanyu Pinyin: Tǔmùbǎo zhībiàn

Jisi Incident
- Traditional Chinese: 己巳之變
- Simplified Chinese: 己巳之变
Transcriptions
Standard Mandarin
- Hanyu Pinyin: Jǐsì zhībiàn
- Location in China

The Tumu Crisis, also known as the Crisis of the Tumu Fortress, or the Jisi Incident, was a border conflict between the Oirat Mongols and the Ming dynasty of China. In July 1449, Esen Taishi, leader of the Oirat Mongols, launched a large-scale, three-pronged invasion of China. Despite having capable generals, Emperor Yingzong of Ming, under the influence of eunuch Wang Zhen who dominated the Ming court at the time, made the decision to personally lead his armies into battle against Esen. On 1 September, the Ming army suffered a crushing defeat at the hands of the much weaker Mongols, and the Emperor was captured. This defeat was one of the biggest military failures in the Ming dynasty's three centuries of existence, and it was largely attributed to the poor leadership of their army.

Esen was not prepared for the scale of his victory or for the capture of the Ming emperor. Initially, he attempted to use the captured Emperor to raise a ransom and planned to conquer the undefended Ming capital of Beijing. His plan was foiled due to the steadfast leadership of the commander in the capital, Yu Qian, and the ascension of the captured Emperor's brother, the Jingtai Emperor. Emperor Yingzong was eventually released in 1450, but his brother placed him under house arrest. Esen faced growing criticism for his failure to exploit his victory over the Ming and was assassinated six years after the battle in 1455.

== Background ==
=== Military situation ===
The Ming dynasty was established in China in 1368 when Zhu Yuanzhang (the Hongwu Emperor), a former peasant rebel, overthrew the Mongol-led Yuan dynasty and forced the Mongols to retreat back to the northern steppes. To counter persistent Mongol threats along the northern frontier, the Hongwu Emperor implemented significant military reforms and launched multiple military campaigns to secure the border regions. His son, the Yongle Emperor, further expanded these efforts by personally leading expeditions against the Mongols between 1410 and 1424. The decision to move the capital to Beijing in 1421 was also a strategic move to focus on northern defense. While these aggressive policies initially strengthened frontier security, they ultimately depleted Ming resources.

After the death of the Yongle Emperor in 1424, the defense of the northern borders began to deteriorate. Despite complaints from generals about the lack of resources, no action was taken. In 1435 and 1438, some garrisons were reinforced, but the overall situation remained unchanged. Inland, only half of the supposed 2.5 million soldiers in the Weisuo military system were actually performing their duties. Farms given to hereditary soldiers from Weisuo garrisons on the borders were often seized by officers, who became landowners while reducing their soldiers to farm laborers, leading to the collapse of local self-sufficiency and a reliance on grain transported from the interior. This resulted in a decline in the quality of training, military prowess, and logistic support (including weapons and equipment). The Beijing garrison was frequently used for construction projects, such as defensive positions, but more often for the building of palaces, temples, and private residences for officers and eunuchs of the imperial palace.

The defense of the northern border was primarily focused on the area between China and the steppe, as the outposts in present-day Inner Mongolia had been abandoned. (Note: During the reign of the Yongle Emperor, the outposts in present-day Inner Mongolia were abandoned due to financial issues. The only exception was the garrison in Kaiping, which was isolated and difficult to defend. The Ming army abandoned it in 1430.) The Great Wall had not yet been constructed and the border was only guarded by patrols between fortified cities. The defense of the northeast relied on three main fortified cities: Xuanfu, Datong, and Beijing. The fortifications of Beijing were not completed until 1445. In Xuanfu, there were 90,000 soldiers, with 35,000 ready for battle and 55,000 in training. Additionally, there were 25,000 horsemen and 9,000 firearms of various types, (Note: 3,000 each of heavy mortars, light hand guns, and the signal guns.) as well as 90,000 hand rockets. Datong had a stronger cavalry force, with 35,000 horses, and was supported by 160,000 men in Beijing. The reserve consisted of garrisons stationed in northeastern China, specifically in North Zhili, Shandong, and Henan.

The border patrol battalions were meant to hold off the enemy until the main forces arrived, but with Xuanfu only 180 km from Beijing, the defense system lacked depth and relied on a quick and decisive response to any attack.

=== Sino-Mongol relations ===
The Mongols were divided into three groups: the Uriankhai in the southeast, the Eastern Mongols (also known as Tatars) in the east, and the Oirats in the west. After Arughtai, leader of the Eastern Mongols, was defeated in 1434, the Oirats took control over Mongolian Plateau. Their chief, Toghon, the Choros taishi, or "grand marshal", strengthened their authority by arranging for his daughter to marry the young khan of the Eastern Mongols, Toghtoa Bukha. (Note: A puppet khan installed by Toghon in 1439. Toghon was not a descendant of Genghis and therefore could not become a khan, even though he effectively ruled over Mongolia.) After Toghon's death in 1440, his son Esen inherited the title of taishi and became the effective Mongol ruler. Esen was more ambitious than his father, and in 1443 and 1445, he launched attacks on Hami, an important city on the route from China to Central Asia near the Chinese border. In 1448, he successfully conquered it. He also attempted to gain the support of the Mongol divisions in the Ming army in the western Chinese province of Gansu. In the east, his authority extended to the borders of Korea. In Beijing, he was viewed as a threat by those who opposed Wang Zhen, a powerful eunuch who held great influence at the imperial court in the 1440s. (Note: Wang Zhen profited from illegal trade activities, such as selling metal tools and weapons to the Oirats. He ignored proposals to strengthen defenses on the northern border and warnings about threats from Esen.)

In their relationship with China, the Mongols were primarily interested in free trade, specifically in the exchange of horses for tea, silk, and other luxury goods. However, the Ming government imposed restrictions and regulations on trade, limiting it to a few designated border towns, with Datong being the main hub. As Esen's power and influence expanded, so did his dependence on these goods to maintain the loyalty of the Mongol tribes. This led to a significant number of Mongols in border markets in the late 1440s, with up to two thousand arriving each year. The large number of armed horsemen posed a serious security concern for the Ming authorities. The Ming government protested against the excessive number of incoming Mongols, causing a sharp deterioration in their relationship. In 1449, the Ming ultimately rejected the Mongols' request for goods and only provided them with a fifth of what was requested. This rejection led the Mongols to resort to force. The immediate cause of the war was Ming's refusal to grant Esen's request to marry an imperial princess for his son.

== Crisis ==
=== Mongol invasion ===
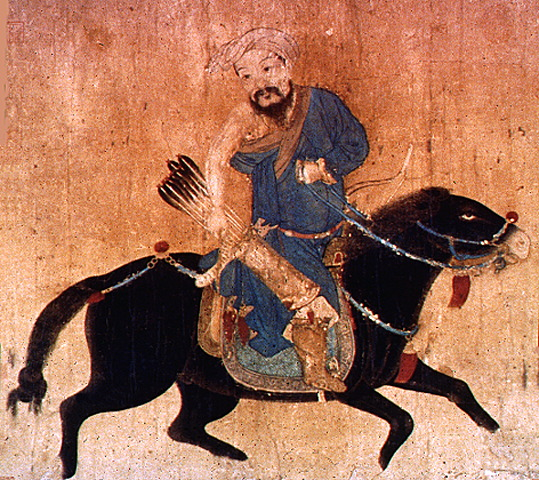
A Mongol horseman. Miniature from the 15th–16th century.

In July 1449, Esen launched a large-scale invasion of China, with the Mongols advancing in three directions. Toghtoa Bukha Khan and the Uriankhai attacked the Liaodong Peninsula in the east, while the second Mongol army advanced on Xuanfu and the third, led by Esen himself, advanced on Datong. The main objective of this campaign was to capture the fortified cities of Xuanfu and Datong, which would grant the Mongols unrestricted access to the northern regions of China.

On 20 July, news of the raid reached Beijing and the Emperor responded by ordering four generals and 45,000 soldiers from the Beijing garrison to advance to Datong and Xuanfu to protect the border. After learning on 30 July that Esen had already attacked Datong, Emperor Yingzong ordered the mobilization of the Beijing garrison. He also declared his intention to personally lead a punitive expedition without consulting his ministers.

Emperor Yingzong was known for his love of military parades, often organized for him by Wang Zhen. His self-confidence was further bolstered by the recent successes of the Ming troops in the Luchuan–Pingmian campaigns and in suppressing the rebellion of Deng Maoqi. All previous Ming emperors, except for Jianwen Emperor, personally led armies into battle. Therefore, Wang Zhen used this to support the Emperor's decision.

The first to protest were Minister of War Kuang Ye (鄺埜) and his deputy Yu Qian. (Note: Both had long warned of the danger posed by the Mongols, but their requests for stronger defenses were consistently rejected.) They believed that the monarch's participation in a punitive expedition was an unacceptably risky adventure. Other officials also attempted to dissuade the Emperor from joining the campaign. Minister of Personnel Wang Zhi (王直) wrote a memorial on behalf of the dissenting officials, arguing that officers were responsible for the dangers of war, and the Emperor, as the head of the imperial family and the empire, and the person on whom the world's attention was focused, should not expose himself to danger. Although the Emperor appreciated his concern, he remained determined to carry out his plans. The last attempt to stop the Emperor was made by a supervising secretary as the army was leaving the city. He threw himself in front of the Emperor's palanquin, but was unsuccessful.

On 3 August, Esen's army defeated the poorly supplied Ming army from Datong at the Yanghe Pass. On the same day, Emperor Yingzong appointed his younger brother Zhu Qiyu, Prince of Cheng, to oversee the administration of the capital during the campaign. Zhu Qiyu was assisted by four representatives from the most influential power groups. These included Prince Consort Commander Jiao Jing (焦敬), who represented the imperial family; Jin Ying, the head of the Directorate of Ceremonial and the highest-ranking eunuch in the absence of Wang Zhen; Minister Wang Zhi, who led the government; and Grand Secretary Gao Gu (高穀). All major decisions were to be postponed until the Emperor's return.

Despite the deteriorating security situation, the Emperor made a sudden decision without any prior preparations. This left the soldiers with only a few days, from 1 to 4 August, to get ready for the campaign. The Emperor was accompanied by twenty experienced generals, most of whom held noble titles, and an equal number of high-ranking officials. They were also accompanied by hundreds of lower-ranking dignitaries, with Wang Zhen serving as the de facto commander-in-chief. While the number of mobilized soldiers is unknown, it is often estimated to be around half a million, but in reality, the actual number may have been significantly smaller. Even under optimal conditions, supplying such a large army would have been challenging. The troops were hastily assembled, poorly supplied, and incompetently led, ultimately leading to disaster.

=== Ming counterattack ===
The army departed from Beijing on 4 August and headed towards the Juyong Pass. The objective was to make a swift and brief march westward, passing through Xuanfu and reaching Datong. The plan was to conduct a rapid campaign in the steppe and then return to Beijing via the southern route. This route was chosen to avoid excessive destruction in the region along the Beijing–Xuanfu–Datong road, as the army would be passing through it twice. The return journey would take them through Yuzhou and the Zijing Pass.

From the very beginning, chaos and disarray plagued the army. The soldiers trudged on through relentless heavy rain. After seven days, they finally reached Xuanfu, but only after being delayed by a storm. Despite pleas from many to turn back, both in Xuanfu and earlier in Juyong Pass, Wang Zhen urged them to press on. By 12 August, some officials were already discussing the possibility of assassinating Wang Zhen and bringing the Emperor back, but they lacked the courage to follow through with their plan.

On 16 August, the army arrived at the corpse-strewn battlefield of Yanghe. Two days later, on 18 August, the Emperor reached Datong. During the journey, more soldiers died from starvation due to poor supplies than from skirmishes with the enemy. Upon reaching Datong, Wang Zhen received reports from local commanders and information from nearby border garrisons, which convinced him that continuing the campaign into the steppe would be dangerous. The expedition was declared victorious and the army turned back on 20 August. The discipline of the army had already begun to deteriorate. Wang Zhen was also concerned about the impact of the army's passage on his hometown in Yuzhou (present-day Yu County, Hebei), so he insisted on returning the same way they had come.

On 27 August, the returning troops arrived in Xuanfu. Just three days later, the Mongols launched an attack on the Ming army's rear in Xuanfu, resulting in its destruction. The Mongols then proceeded to Yao'er Gorge, where they ambushed and destroyed a newly formed rear guard of 40,000 cavalry under the command of Zhu Yong (朱勇). The following day, 31 August, the Ming army set up camp at the Tumu post station. Despite suggestions from ministers, Wang Zhen refused to seek refuge in the nearby walled city of Huailai, which was only 10.5 km away. Wang Zhen's reluctance was due to his desire to keep his baggage with him. The army faced a lack of water in Tumu, leaving the men and horses thirsty.

=== Tumu debacle ===
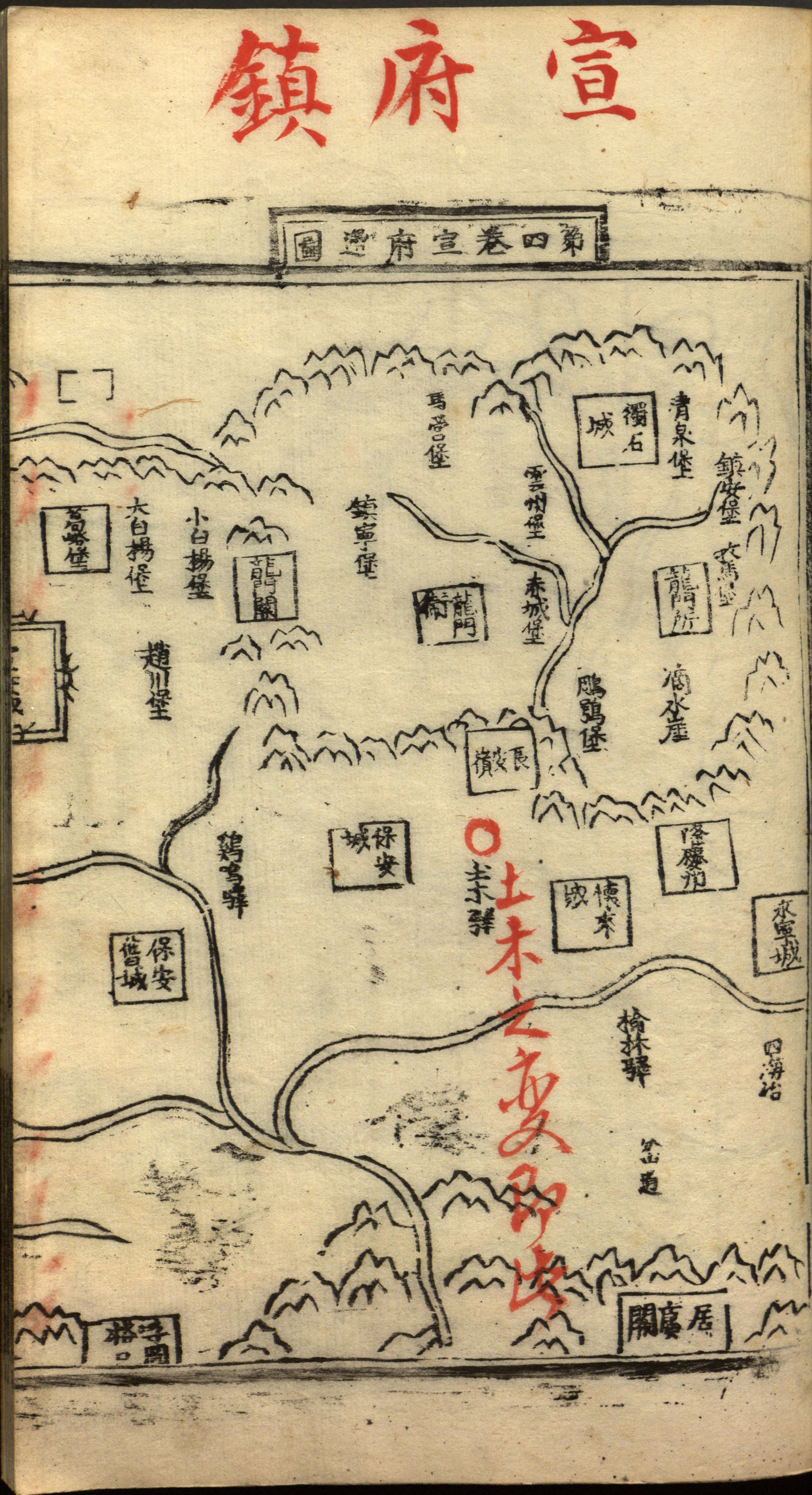
Map of the Xuanfu Garrison in the Huang Ming jiu bian kao (皇明九邊考), 1544. Location of the battle of Tumu on the map:

Esen dispatched troops to block Chinese access to the river south of their camp. By the morning of 1 September, the Mongols had surrounded the Chinese camp and offered to negotiate. Wang Zhen ignored their overtures and instead ordered the confused Ming army to advance towards the river. A battle ensued between the disorganized Ming army and the vanguard of the Mongol army, with Esen himself choosing not to participate. Only 20,000 Mongols were involved in the battle but the hungry and thirsty Ming soldiers were unable to put up much resistance. The Ming army suffered a swift defeat, with nearly half of its soldiers lost and a significant amount of weapons and equipment seized by the Mongols. Among the casualties were high-ranking officials, including two dukes, two marquises, five counts, several generals, and hundreds of officials. Notable figures such as the old general Zhang Fu and the grand secretaries Cao Nai (曹鼐) and Zhang Yi (張益) were also killed. After reclaiming the area, Ming troops were able to gather tens of thousands of firearms, armor, and other equipment left behind by the defeated army.

During the battle, the Emperor's bodyguard attempted to remove him from the fighting, but were unsuccessful. In the chaos, one of the Ming officers killed Wang Zhen. (Note: Historians Denis C. Twitchett and Tilemann Grimm cautiously approach the information about Wang Zhen's killing by his own officer, stating it as "according to some reports".) The Emperor was then captured and taken to a Mongol camp near Xuanfu on 3 September. Esen decided not to kill him and instead chose to inform the Ming side of the Emperor's survival before deciding on his next course of action.

== Aftermath ==
Empress Dowager Sun and Empress Qian, who were leading the court, learned of the battle and the Emperor's capture in the middle of the night of 2–3 September. They quickly sent gifts to Esen, along with a request for the Emperor's release. Panic spread as the Beijing garrison was left with less than 100,000 soldiers and the fate of Datong and Xuanfu was uncertain.

Reader-in-waiting Xu Cheng, (Note: Hanlin Academician Reader-in-waiting (翰林院侍讀), rank 5b) a native of Suzhou known for his military strategy skills and familiarity with the border situation, suggested temporarily moving the capital to the south to keep it safe from the enemy. Minister of Rites Hu Ying opposed this plan, arguing that the tombs of the Yongle and Xuande emperors could not be abandoned. (Note: The founder of the dynasty, the Hongwu Emperor, was buried in the south and the Beijing authorities remained formally "auxiliary" (xingzai) until 1441.) Vice Minister of War Yu Qian then strongly opposed the idea, even threatening to execute anyone who suggested it. (Note: There was a precedent for Yu Qian's attitude. 450 years earlier, the then chancellor of the Song dynasty, Kou Zhun, used the same threat when the Khitan attacked the Song capital of Kaifeng.) This calmed down the panicking officials, as Yu Qian was supported by influential eunuchs and the grand secretaries Chen Xun (陳循) and Shang Lu (商輅). Although Empress Dowager Sun reluctantly approved staying and authorized any necessary actions to defend the capital, many officials chose to flee south, and some sent their families there for safety.

The Mongols approached Xuanfu and demanded entry into the city for the captured Emperor Yingzong and his entourage. The defenders of the city responded by shooting at them. The Mongols then retreated to Datong. In a separate message to Beijing, the Emperor requested that supplies be provided for the Mongols. The local commanders at Datong also refused to open the gates; they cited imperial orders as their reason for not surrendering. Regional commander Liu An went to the Mongol camp to meet with the Emperor, followed by several officials and officers from the city, but the city was not surrendered. Liu An only handed over the local silver reserve (140,000 liang) to the Emperor, who then distributed it among the Mongol chieftains.

On 4 September, Minister Wang Zhi requested the Empress Dowager appoint the Prince of Cheng to govern the country. The Empress Dowager agreed, but limited his authority by labeling it as "special" and "temporary". Additionally, she also promoted the two-year-old Zhu Jianshen, eldest son of the captured Emperor, to the position of heir to the throne. This appointment was made on 6 September.

Yu Qian used his position as the highest-ranking official in the Ministry of War to oversee defense preparations. He ensured that grain was transported from the granaries in Tongzhou, located near Beijing, where almost half of the grain stocks were stored. (Note: Tongzhou had been a center of Mongol settlement since the time of the Yuan dynasty, and was now suspected of being in alliance with the enemy.) The Prince of Cheng also supported Yu's plan to gather military units from nearby provinces and the south, as well as levies from the metropolitan area. On 7 September, Yu was appointed as Minister of War. On the same day, commanders in Datong were warned against responding to the captured Emperor's requests.

=== Enthronement of a new emperor and the defense of Beijing ===
On 15 September, officials in Beijing urged the Prince of Cheng to assume the role of emperor to stabilize the government and reduce the importance of the captured Emperor Yingzong in the hands of the Oirats. Although initially hesitant, the prince eventually ascended the throne as the Jingtai Emperor on 17 (or 23) September. He declared his captive brother as the "emperor emeritus" (太上皇帝; Taishang Huangdi), a title that was purely honorary.

Yu Qian withdrew 80,000 soldiers from Xuanfu and other areas to defend Beijing. He also called in reserves from northern China, including transport and training units and coast guard units. New commanders were appointed and defenses were organized. Esen once again approached Datong, this time claiming to be defending Emperor Yingzong's right to the throne. His claim was rejected by the garrison at Yanghe Pass. He then marched on Beijing with the intention of restoring Emperor Yingzong to the throne. The defenders at the Jijing Pass held off the Mongol army for several days before being outnumbered. Esen finally reached Beijing on 27 October. With 220,000 men at his disposal, Yu Qian was able to fend off the 70,000 Mongol troops. After five days of fighting, the Mongols realized they did not have the strength to take the city and returned to their homeland. Following Esen's failed campaign, the Ming troops were able to drive out the remaining smaller Mongol forces from China. Mongol unity began to crumble rapidly. Just a few days after his departure from Beijing, Toghtoa Bukha Khan sent an envoy with tribute to the Ming court.

In the following weeks, the Mongols continued their border raids, sometimes involving numerous detachments. The Ming army, commanded from Beijing by Yu Qian, responded by strengthening the defenses of the passes, while the Ming cavalry cleared the border steppes. The operations of the Ming troops did not have significant results, but they faced difficulties in supplying their troops due to the destruction of the surrounding area.

Esen then offered to release Emperor Yingzong, but the Jingtai Emperor was hesitant to accept, as he wanted to solidify his position in the palace and government before allowing his brother to return. Emperor Yingzong was not able to return until September 1450, remaining in captivity for twelve and a half months. Upon his return, the Jingtai Emperor felt threatened by Emperor Yingzong and ordered him to stay in the Southern Palace within the Forbidden City, limiting his contact with the outside world. Emperor Yingzong was placed under house arrest.

== Consequences ==
The Tumu Crisis sparked a major reorganization of Ming authorities and the military, which ultimately contributed to the relative stability of the Ming dynasty for the remainder of the 15th century. Although the initial impact of losing the battle and capturing the emperor was significant, the fortified cities were able to hold their ground against the Mongols, preventing them from permanently occupying any territory. There were no territorial changes, and relations between the two sides returned to their previous state after a few months. The Mongols' main objective was not to gain territory, but rather to establish stable trade relations with China. Esen quickly established positive relations with the Ming dynasty following the battle. His failure to make significant gains led to widespread criticism in Mongolia and weakened his authority. In 1453, he declared himself Khan, but was murdered just two years later.
