= Yu Qian =

Chinese official (1398–1457)

- 于謙
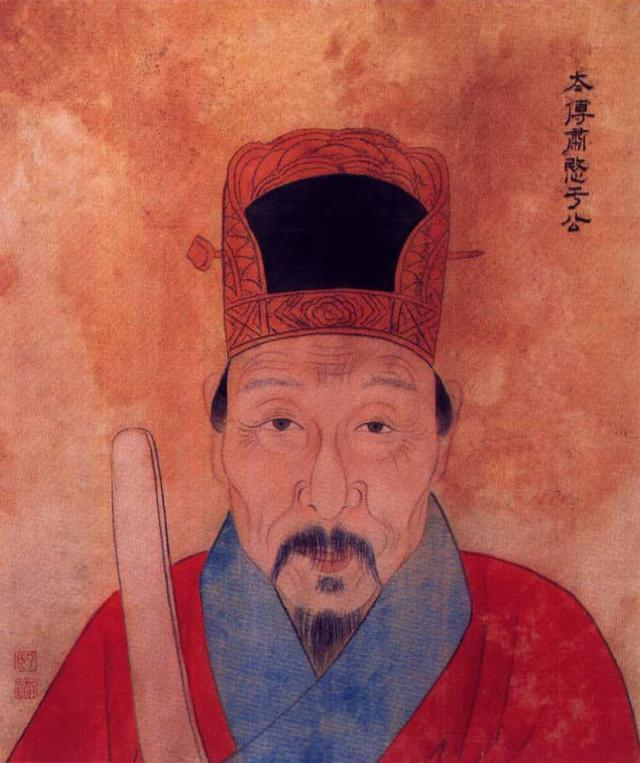
- Portrait by Gu Jianlong

Grand coordinator of Shanxi and Henan
- In office 1430–1447
- Preceded by: Xu Kuo (as Grand coordinator of Henan)
- Succeeded by: Zhu Jian (as Grand coordinator of Shanxi); Wang Lai (as Grand coordinator of Henan)

Minister of War
- In office 1449–1457
- Preceded by: Kuang Ye
- Succeeded by: Wang Ji

Personal details
- Born: May 13, 1398 Hangzhou, Zhejiang
- Died: February 16, 1457 (aged 58) Beijing
- Spouse: Lady Dong
- Children: Yu Mian; one daughter
- Parent: Yu Yanzhao (father)
- Occupation: Official

Yu Qian (simplified Chinese: 于谦; traditional Chinese: 于謙; pinyin: Yú Qiān; 1398–1457), courtesy name Tingyi (廷益), art name Jie'an (節庵), was a Chinese official who served under the Ming dynasty. Under Emperor Yingzong, he worked in the Ministry of War, eventually becoming a vice minister. He distinguished himself in the Tumu Crisis, leading the defense of Beijing against the Mongols, and was promoted to the position of Minister of War. For the next eight years, he remained the most influential member of the government of the new Jingtai Emperor. In January 1457, Emperor Yingzong returned to power and Yu Qian was promptly executed. His life is detailed in the 1580s novel Yu Shaobao cui zhong quanzhuan.

== Biography ==
Yu Qian was born in Qiantang County, Hangzhou, Zhejiang. He started his career in the Ming civil service after obtaining the position of a jinshi (進士; successful candidate) in the imperial examination in 1421. He helped to suppress a rebellion by the prince Zhu Gaoxu in 1426 and earned the favour of the Xuande Emperor (r. 1425–1435), who appointed him as the Grand Coordinator of Shanxi and Henan. During Emperor Yingzong's first reign (1435–1449), Yu offended the influential court eunuch Wang Zhen and ended up being imprisoned. However, he was released later, reinstated as an official, and further promoted to serve as the Minister of War.

In 1449, Yu played an important role in leading the Defense of Beijing from attacks by the Oirat Mongols, who had earlier captured Emperor Yingzong at the Battle of Tumu. Emperor Yingzong's brother and successor, the Jingtai Emperor (r. 1449–1457), appointed Yu as the Crown Prince's Guardian and Tutor. In 1457, Emperor Yingzong, who had returned after he was released by the Mongols, seized power from the Jingtai Emperor in a coup and began his second reign (1457–1464). Yu was accused of treason and executed. He was later posthumously rehabilitated by the Chenghua Emperor (r. 1464–1487) and given the posthumous name Sumin (lit. "Stern and Suffering") by the Hongzhi Emperor, afterwards changed into "Zhongsu" (lit."loyal and stern") by the Wanli Emperor (r. 1572–1620). There are memorial halls and shrines built in Beijing and Hangzhou to commemorate and honour Yu Qian.

== Gallery ==
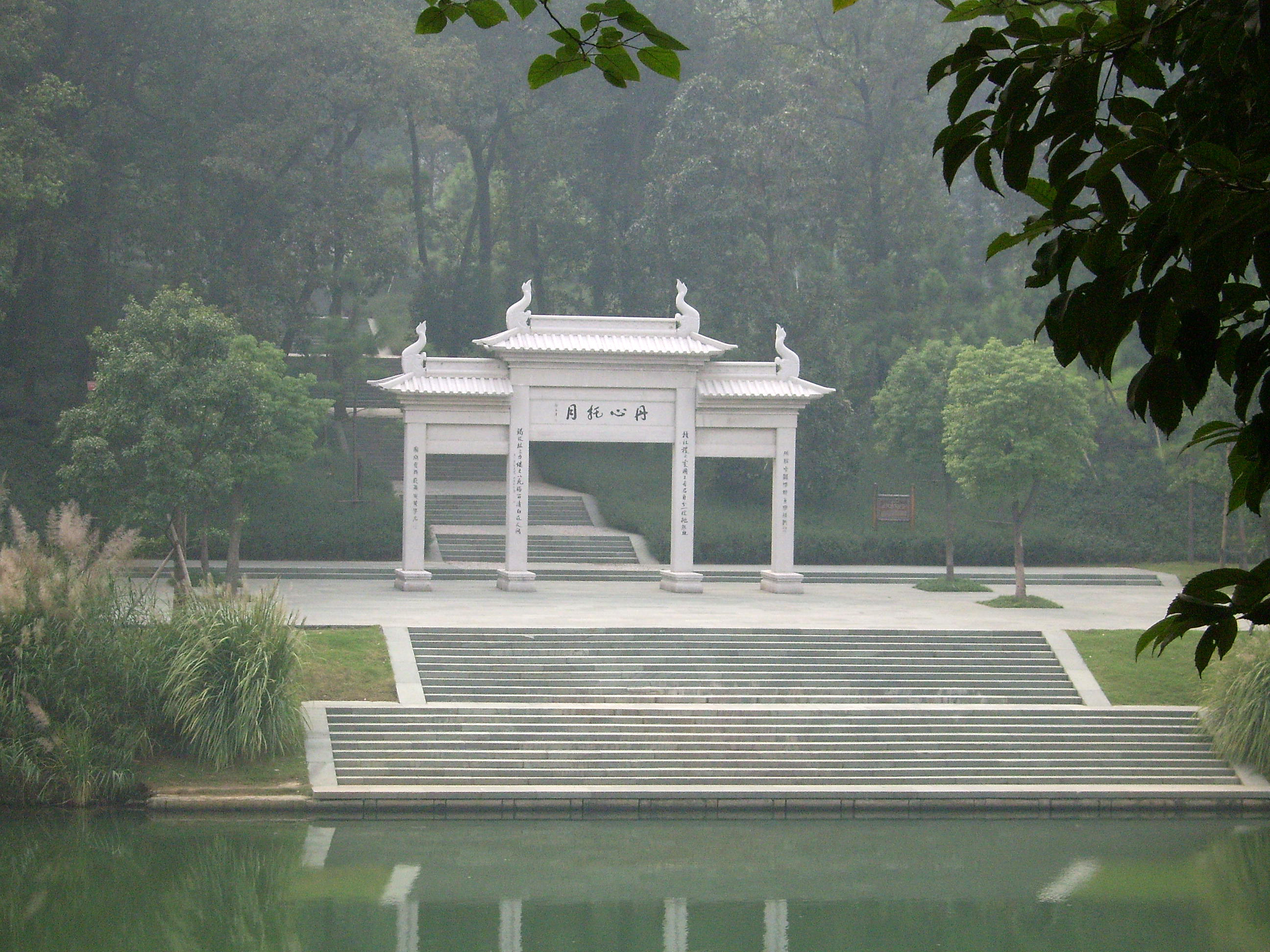
Yu Qian Temple, Hangzhou

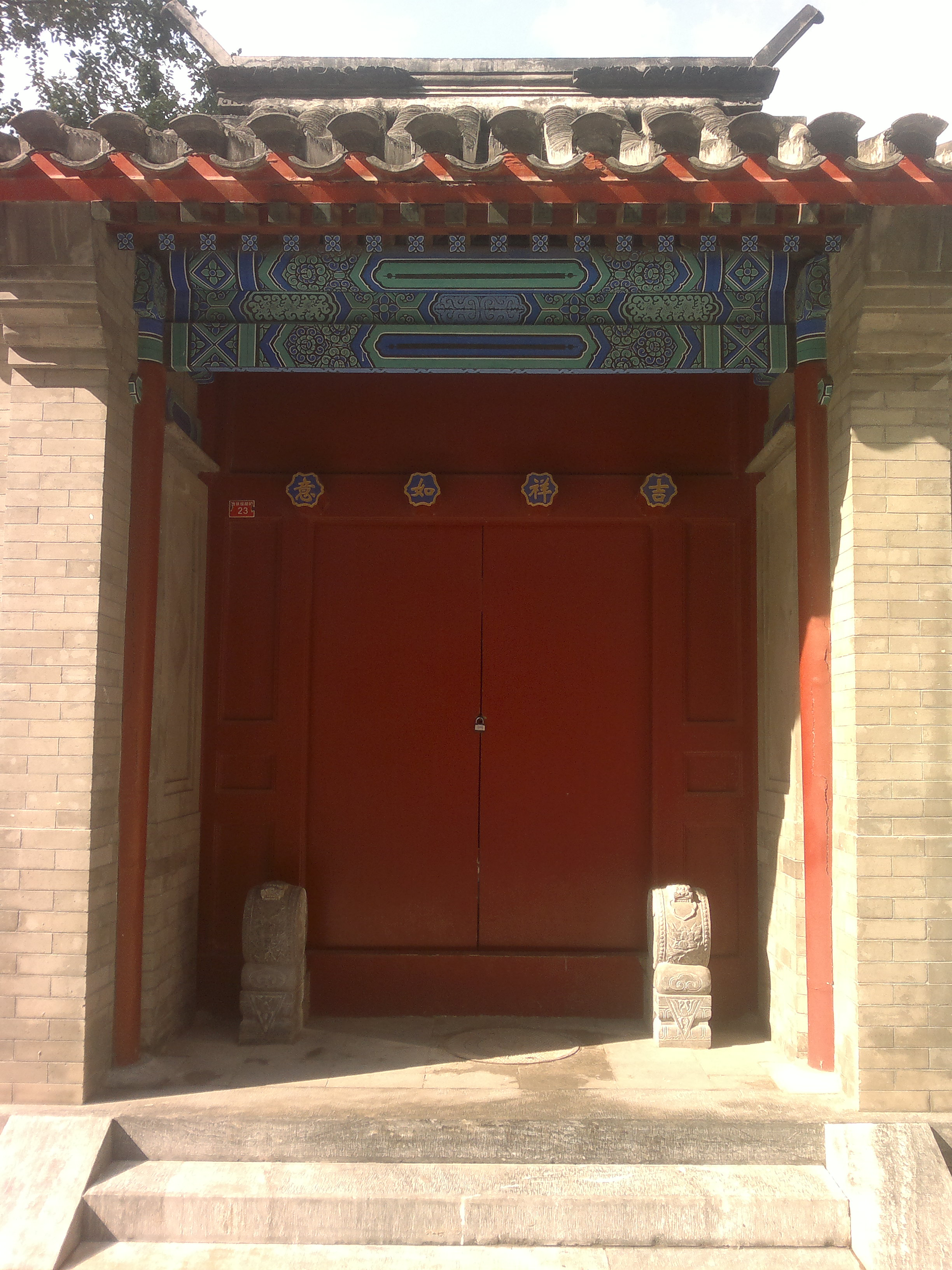
Entrance to the Yu Qian Temple in Beijing.

== See also ==
- History of Beijing
