= List of consorts and children of the Chenghua Emperor =

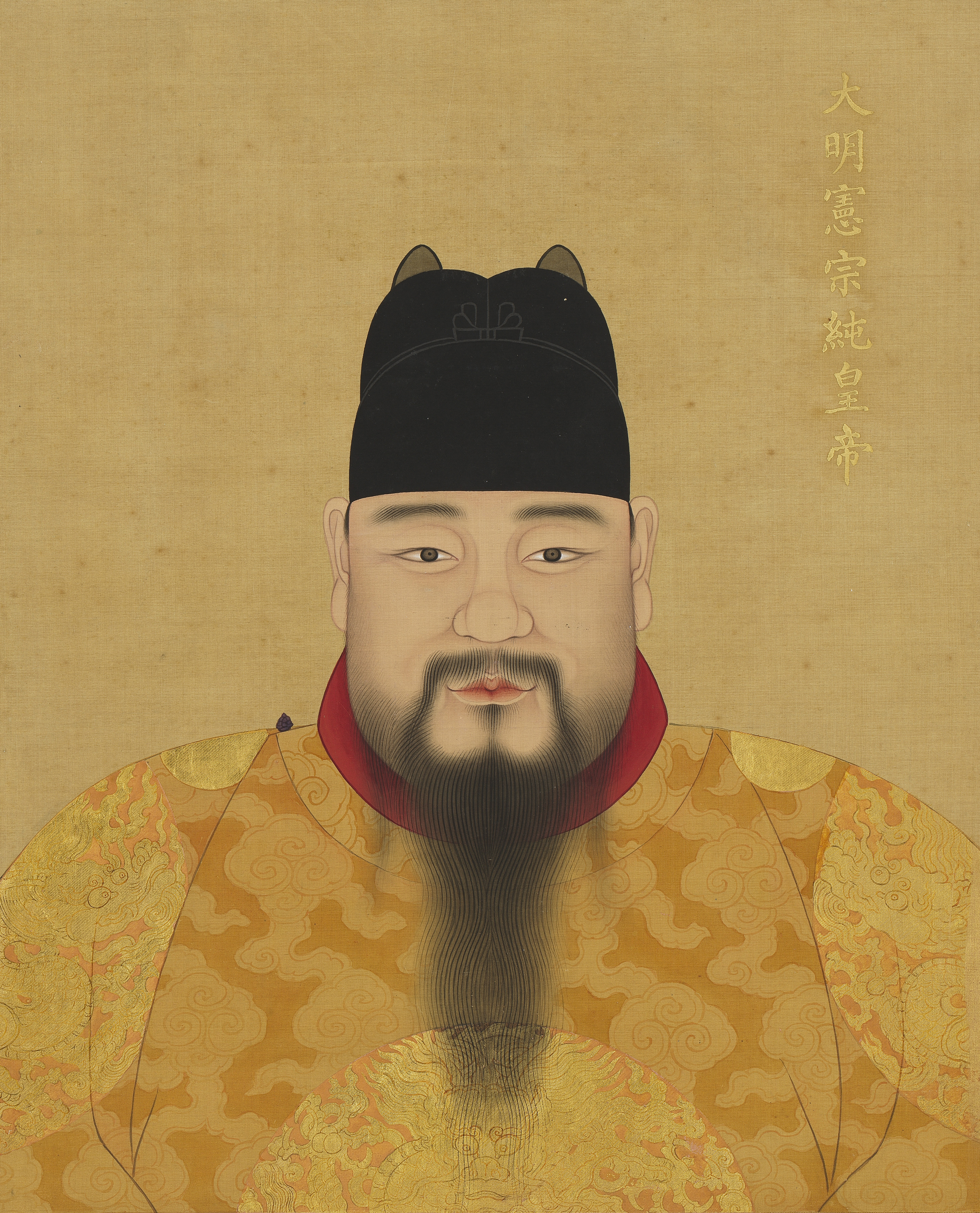
Portrait of the Chenghua Emperor

The Chenghua Emperor, the ninth emperor of the Ming dynasty of China, had two empresses during his reign, as well as a large number of consorts of various ranks. He also had fourteen sons and six daughters. The Emperor's favorite consort was Lady Wan, his former nurse, who was seventeen years his senior and dominated much of his reign. His first empress was Lady Wu, whom he married upon his accession in 1464. Just one month after the wedding, the Emperor deposed Empress Wu and stripped her of her title, as she had clashed with Lady Wan and requested that Lady Wan be punished for her disrespect. This demonstrated to everyone throughout the court and government the extent of Lady Wan's control over the Emperor. Lady Wu spent the next 45 years in seclusion within the Forbidden City. In the same year, Lady Wang became the new empress. She was careful not to provoke Lady Wan and remained childless in order to protect herself from any potential misfortune. In 1466, Lady Wan bore the Emperor a son and was granted the title of "Noble Consort" (Guifei). Their son died within a year, and Lady Wan did not have more children. In order to secure her position, she closely monitored the Emperor and even forced other women to have abortions to prevent the birth of a potential rival son. A few years later, the Emperor had a son by another concubine, who was named as his successor in December 1471, but the child died shortly afterward. Historians generally suspect that Lady Wan was responsible for the death of this child.

One day in 1475, while his attendants were combing his hair, the Chenghua Emperor, then nearly twenty-eight, lamented to himself in the mirror that he was growing old without an heir. A eunuch attendant then spoke up, telling him that he already had a son. The surprised emperor demanded to know more, and the eunuch revealed that a woman surnamed Ji had given birth to his son in 1470. Lady Ji was from Guangxi and was likely a captive of the Yao tribe who was brought to the palace around 1467. In 1469, she met the Emperor and became pregnant. Lady Wan discovered the pregnancy, but her orders for the eunuchs to give the mother an abortifacient were not followed. Instead, they hid her in the chambers of the former Empress Wu, where she gave birth to a boy on 30 July 1470. For the next five years, the mother and child lived in secrecy with Lady Wu. The Emperor, who was delighted with his son, recognized him and named him Zhu Youcheng. He then entrusted his mother, Empress Dowager Zhou, with overseeing the child's safety. A month after this, Lady Ji died under suspicious circumstances. (Note: According to historian Frederick W. Mote, Lady Wan's agent poisoned Lady Ji.) The Emperor then moved out of the palace occupied by Lady Wan and protected his heir from her. Empress Dowager Zhou warned her grandson not to eat or drink anything when visiting Lady Wan. The Emperor's relationship with Lady Wan changed after 1475, as he had five consorts and a total of eleven sons and six daughters between 1476 and 1487. Despite no longer living with Lady Wan, the Emperor remained devoted to her. Lady Wan died on 3 February 1487, and the Emperor died in September of the same year. Zhu Youcheng then ascended the throne as the Hongzhi Emperor. He posthumously honored his mother, Lady Ji, as empress.

One of the Chenghua Emperor's surviving sons, Zhu Youyuan, was a learned and cultured man with an interest in poetry and calligraphy. He was born to Lady Shao, and in 1487 his elder brother, the Hongzhi Emperor, granted him the title of Prince of Xing. Zhu Youyuan died in 1519 and was succeeded in the princely title by his son, Zhu Houcong. Two years later, when the Hongzhi Emperor's son and successor, the Zhengde Emperor, died without an heir, Zhu Houcong was chosen to be the new emperor as the Jiajing Emperor. The Jiajing Emperor granted imperial status to his late father and his grandmother, Lady Shao.

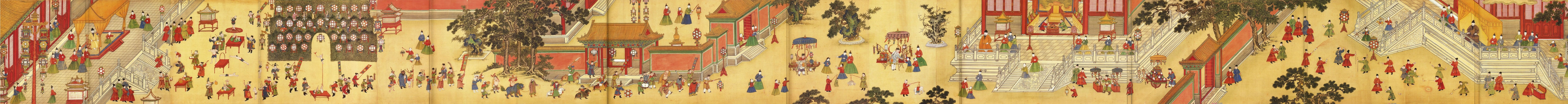
The Emperor Xianzong Enjoying the Lantern Festival (明憲宗元宵行樂圖), painted by an imperial court artist in 1485, depicts the Chenghua Emperor celebrating the Lantern Festival with his family in the Forbidden City. The festivities include acrobatic performances, operas, magic shows, and firecrackers being set off.

== List ==
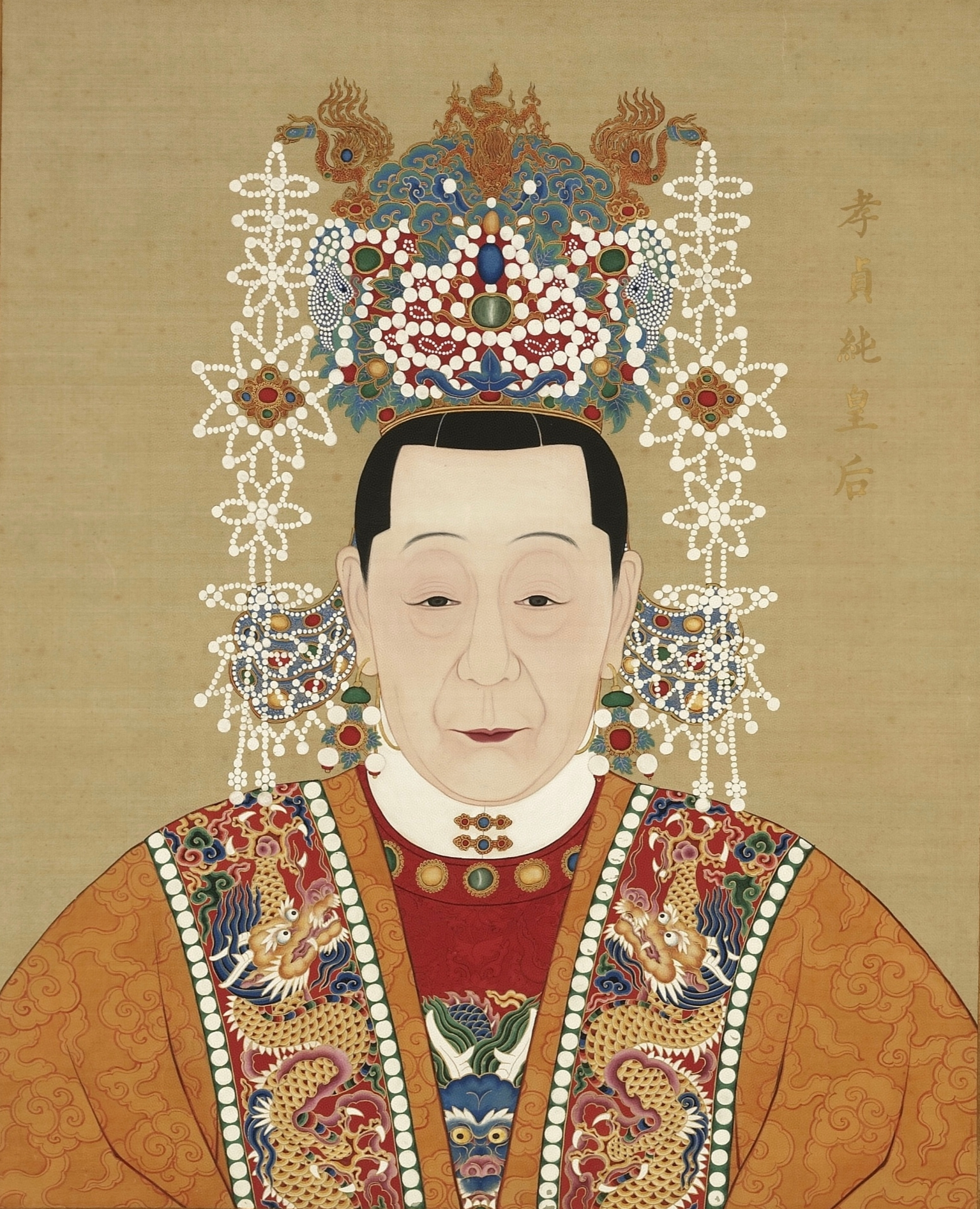
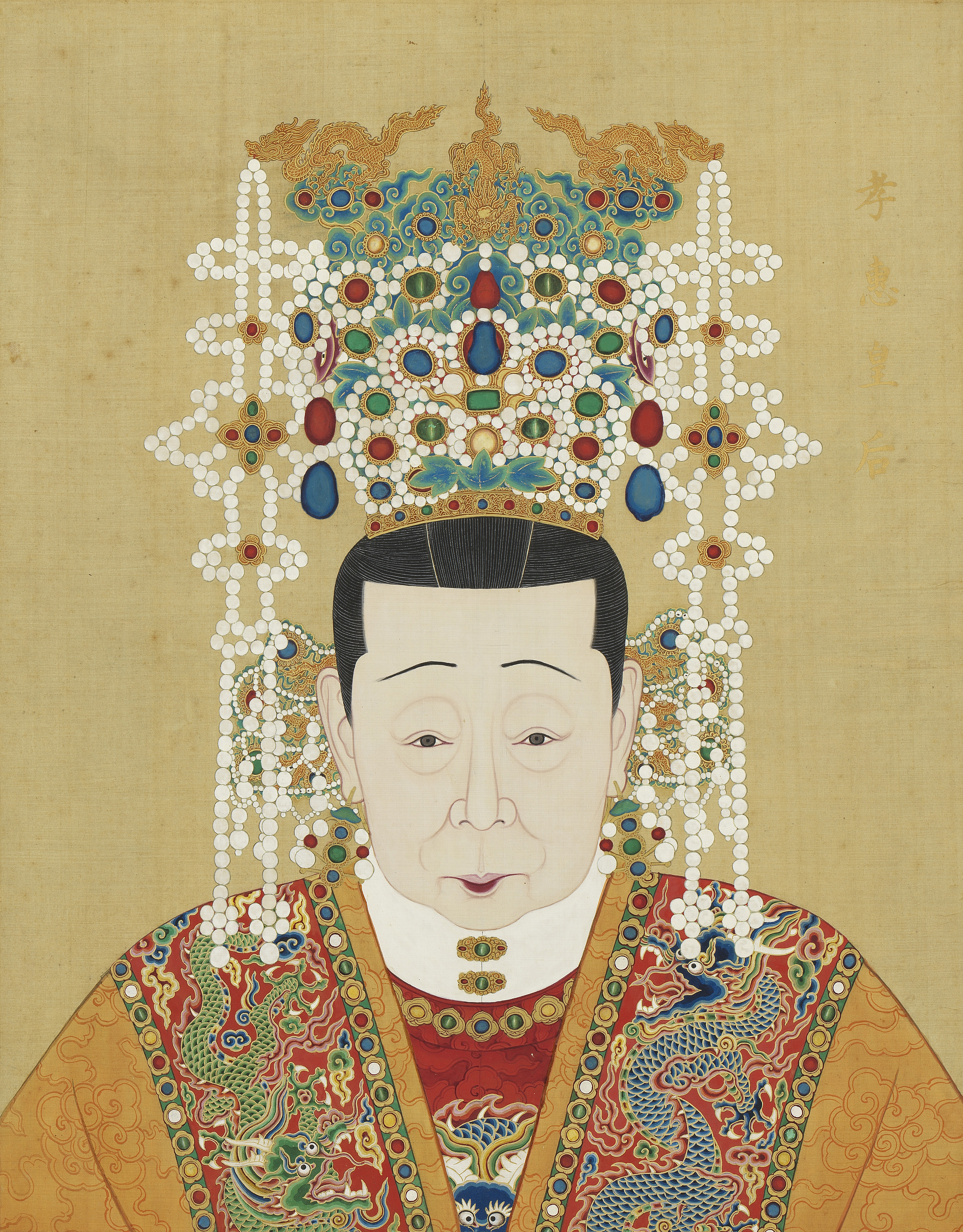
From left to right: Empress Wang, the Chenghua Emperor's second empress; Lady Shao, the mother of Zhu Youyuan, Prince of Xing; the Hongzhi Emperor, the Chenghua Emperor's third son and successor; and Zhu Youyuan, Prince of Xing, the Chenghua Emperor's fourth son

Consorts and children of the Chenghua Emperor
Consorts	Children (Note: Children of the Chenghua Emperor by his respective consorts, with birth order indicated)
Deposed Empress (廢后) of the Wu clan (吳氏; 1448–1509)	—N/a
Empress Xiaozhenchun (孝貞純皇后) of the Wang clan (王氏; 1449–1518)	—N/a
Empress Xiaomu (孝穆皇后) of the Ji clan (紀氏; d. 1475)	Zhu Youcheng (朱佑樘), the Hongzhi Emperor (弘治帝; 1470–1505), third son
Empress Xiaohui (孝惠皇后) of the Shao clan (邵氏; d. 1522)	Zhu Youyuan (朱佑杬), Emperor Ruizong (睿宗; 1476–1519), fourth son (father of the Jiajing Emperor)
Empress Xiaohui (孝惠皇后) of the Shao clan (邵氏; d. 1522)	Zhu Youlun (朱佑棆), Prince Hui of Qi (岐惠王; 1478–1501), fifth son
Empress Xiaohui (孝惠皇后) of the Shao clan (邵氏; d. 1522)	Zhu Youyun (朱佑枟), Prince Jing of Yong (雍靖王; 1481–1507), eighth son
Imperial Noble Consort Gongsu (恭肅皇貴妃) of the Wan clan (萬氏; 1428–1487), personal name Zhen'er (貞兒)	First son (14 February 1466 – November 1466)
Consort Duanshunxian (端順賢妃) of the Bo clan (柏氏; d. 1527)	Zhu Youji (朱佑極), Crown Prince Daogong (悼恭皇太子; 1469–1472), second son
Consort Zhuangjingshun (莊靖順妃) of the Wang clan (王氏; 1448–1494)	Princess Renhe (仁和公主; d. 1544), first daughter. Married in 1489 to Qi Shimei (齊世美).
Consort Gonghuihe (恭惠和妃) of the Liang clan (梁氏; d. 1533)	—N/a
Consort Duanrongzhao (端榮昭妃) of the Wang clan (王氏; 1451–1480)	—N/a
Consort Jingshunhui (靖順惠妃) of the Guo clan (郭氏; d. 1491)	Princess Yongkang (永康公主; d. 1549), second daughter. Married in 1493 to Cui Yuan (崔元).
Consort Zhuangyide (莊懿德妃) of the Zhang clan (張氏; 1448–1497)	Zhu Youbin (朱佑檳), Prince Duan of Yi (益端王; 1479–1539), sixth son
Consort Zhuangyide (莊懿德妃) of the Zhang clan (張氏; 1448–1497)	Zhu Youhui (朱佑楎), Prince Gong of Heng (衡恭王; 1479–1538), seventh son
Consort Zhuangyide (莊懿德妃) of the Zhang clan (張氏; 1448–1497)	Zhu Youpeng (朱佑梈), Prince An of Ru (汝安王; 1484–1541), 11th son
Consort Duanyi'an (端懿安妃) of the Yao clan (姚氏; d. 1491)	Zhu Youzhi (朱佑榰), Prince Ding of Shou (壽定王; 1481–1545), ninth son
Consort Ronghuigong (榮惠恭妃) of the Yang clan (楊氏; d. 1534)	Zhu Youshun (朱佑橓), Prince Jian of Jing (涇簡王; 1485–1537), 12th son
Consort Ronghuigong (榮惠恭妃) of the Yang clan (楊氏; d. 1534)	Zhu Youkai (朱佑楷), Prince Yi of Shen (申懿王; 1487–1503), 14th son
Consort Kangshunduan (康順端妃) of the Pan clan (潘氏; d. 1538)	Zhu Youshu (朱佑樞), Prince Zhuang of Rong (榮莊王; 1486–1539), 13th son
Consort Gongyijing (恭懿敬妃) of the Wang clan (王氏; 1465–1510)	Tenth son
Consort Zhaoshunli (昭順麗妃) of the Zhang clan (章氏; d. 1501)	Princess Deqing (德清公主; d. 1549), third daughter. Married in 1496 to Lin Yue (林岳; d. 1518).
Consort Hehuijing (和惠靜妃) of the Yue clan (岳氏; 1465–1534)	Princess Xianyou (仙遊公主; d. 1492), sixth daughter
Consort Jingxirong (靖僖榮妃) of the Tang clan (唐氏; d. 1524)	—N/a
Unknown	Fourth daughter
Unknown	Princess Changtai (長泰公主; d. 1487), fifth daughter
