= Empress Wang (Chenghua) =

Empress of China from 1464 to 1487

Empress Xiaozhenchun 孝貞純皇后
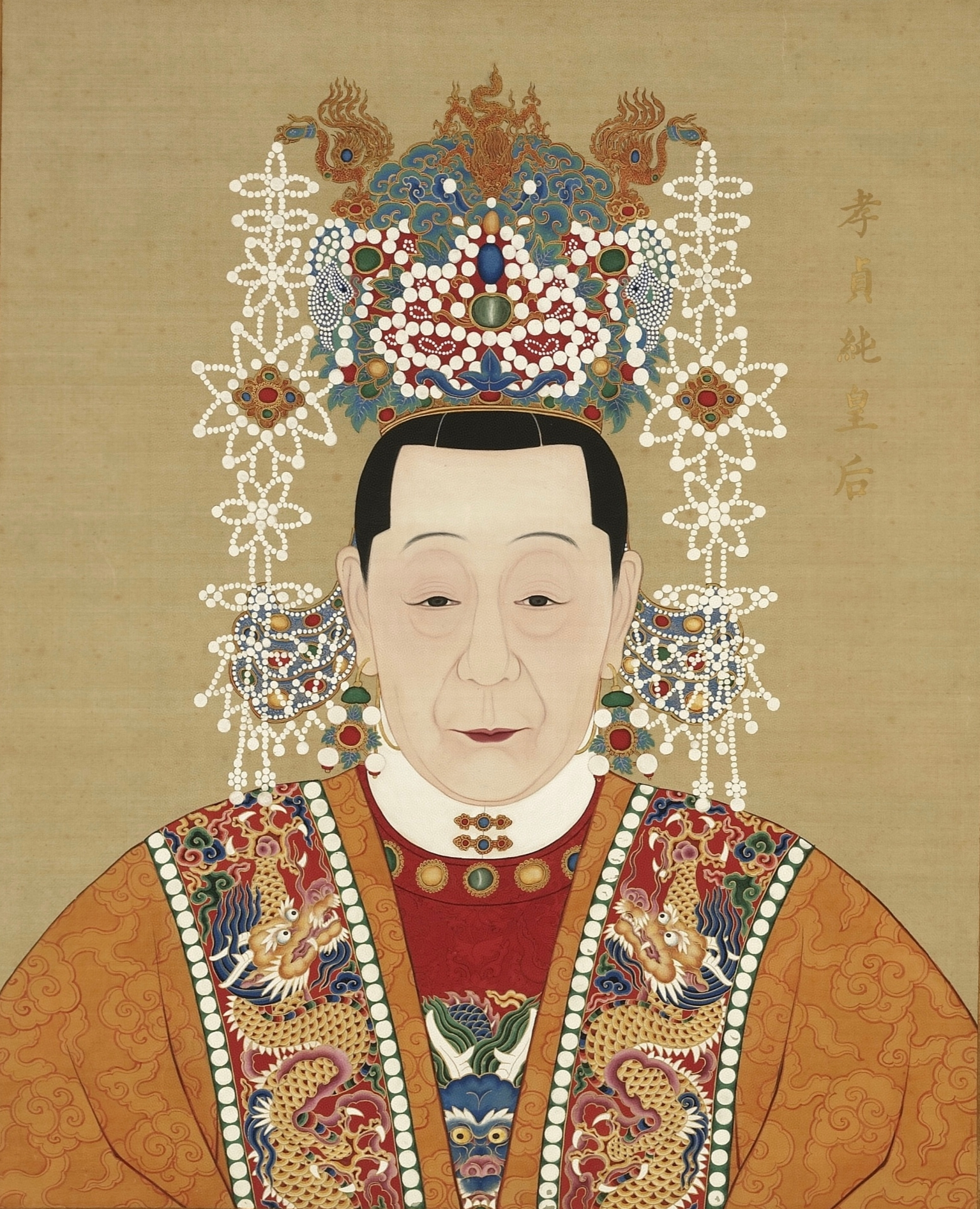

Grand empress dowager of the Ming dynasty
- Tenure: 1505–1518
- Predecessor: Empress Xiaosu
- Successor: Empress Xiaohui (Ming dynasty)

Empress dowager of the Ming dynasty
- Tenure: 1487–1505
- Predecessor: Empress Dowager Ciyi; Empress Dowager Shengci
- Successor: Empress Dowager Zhaosheng; Empress Dowager Zhangsheng

Empress consort of the Ming dynasty
- Tenure: 1464–1487
- Predecessor: Empress Wu
- Successor: Empress Xiaochengjing
- Born: 1440/1450; Shangyuan County, Zhili (present-day Nanjing)
- Died: 1518 (aged 68/78)
- Spouse: Chenghua Emperor (m. 1464; died 1487)
Posthumous name
- Empress Xiaozhen Zhuangyi Gongjing Renci Yintian Fusheng Chun (孝貞莊懿恭靖仁慈欽天輔聖純皇后)
- Clan: Wang (王)
- Father: Wang Zhen (王鎮)

Empress Xiaozhenchun (1440/1450 –1518), of the Wang clan, was a Chinese empress consort of the Ming dynasty, married to the Chenghua Emperor.

Empress Wang was chosen by the emperor for the position of empress after her predecessor had been deposed due to a conflict with the emperor's favorite concubine, Consort Wan. Aware of the mistake of her predecessor, Wang was very anxious to avoid any conflict with the emperor's favorite. Consort Wan had no son with the emperor after her first son died in infancy, and feared the competition if any other of the emperor's consorts or concubines gave birth to a son. It was said that Empress Wang deliberately stayed childless to avoid such a conflict with Consort Wan. The efforts to avoid all conflicts with Consort Wan and to show herself submissive to her did secure the position of Empress Wang at court.

In 1487, the Chenghua Emperor died, and Empress Wang was given the title Empress dowager. In 1510, she was further raised in rank by the then-reigning emperor, the Zhengde Emperor, who was the eldest son of the Hongzhi Emperor and the grandson of the Chenghua Emperor.

== Titles ==
- During the reign of the Zhengtong Emperor (r. 1435–1449)
  - Lady Wang (王氏)
- During the reign of the Chenghua Emperor (r. 1464–1487)
  - Consort (妃; from 1464)
  - Empress (皇后; from 1464)
- During the reign of the Hongzhi Emperor (r. 1487–1505)
  - Empress dowager (皇太后; 22 from September 1487)
- During the reign of the Zhengde Emperor (r. 1505–1521)
  - Grand empress dowager (太皇太后; from 19 June 1505)
  - Grand Empress Dowager Cisheng Kangshou (慈聖康壽太皇太后; from 1510)
  - Empress Xiaozhen Zhuangyi Gongjing Renci Yintian Fusheng Chun (孝貞莊懿恭靖仁慈欽天輔聖純皇后; from 1518)

== Notes ==
- Goodrich L. Carington; Fang Chaoying, et al., Dictionary of Ming biografi, 1368-1644 . New York: Columbia University Press, 1976. xxi + 1751 s. ISBN 0-231-03801-1 (1 vol.) 023103833X (vol. 2). Lösenord Chu Chien-shen, s. 300.
- MOTE, Frederick W .. Den Ch'eng-hua och Hung-chih regerar, 1465-1505. I MOTE, Frederick W. Twitchett, Denis C. The Cambridge History of China Volym 7: Mingdynastin, 1368-1644, del 1 . Cambridge. Cambridge University Press, 1988. [Nedan Mote (1988)] ISBN 0521243327 . S. 343-402, vid p. 347
- GEISS, James. Cheng-te regeringstid, 1506-1521. I Twitchett, Denis; Fairbank, John K. Cambridge History of Kina: Volym 7, Mingdynastin, 1368-1644, del 1 Cambridge. Cambridge University Press, 1988. [Nedan Geiss]. ISBN 0521243327 S. 403-439 om. . 422.

Chinese royalty
Preceded by Empress Wu	Empress consort of China; 1464–1487	Succeeded by Empress Xiaochengjing
