= Lady Wu =

Lady Wu may refer to:

- Lady Wu (Sun Jian's wife) (died 202)
- Empress Wu (Zhaolie) (died 245)
- Wu Zetian (624–705)
- Consort Wu (Xuanzong) (died 737)
- Lady Wu (Qian Liu's wife) (858–919)
- Wu Hanyue (913–952)
- Empress Wu (Song dynasty) (1115–1197)
- Empress Wu (Chenghua) (died 1509)

== See also ==
- Wu (surname)
- Lady Wu: The First Empress, 2004 Chinese TV series
