= Empress Ji =

Chinese imperial consort (d. 1475)

Empress Xiaomu 孝穆皇后
- Empress of the Ming dynasty (posthumously)
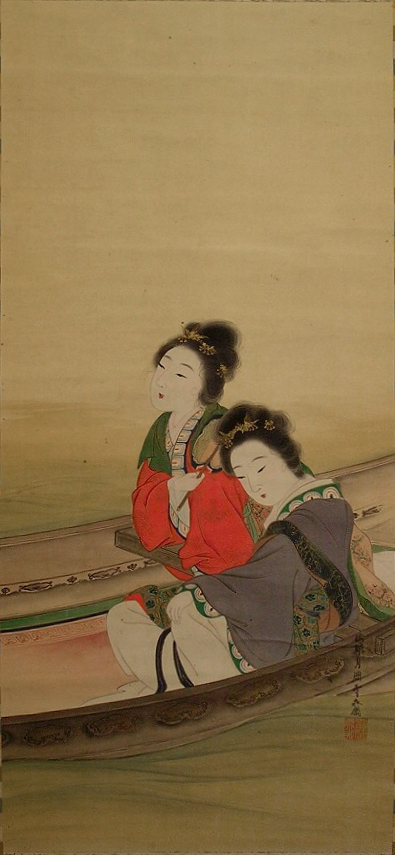
- Empress Ji by Tsukioka Settei
- Died: July 1475
- Burial: Mao Mausoleum, Ming tombs
- Spouse: Chenghua Emperor (m. 1469)
- Issue: Hongzhi Emperor
Posthumous name
- Empress Xiaomu Cihui Gongke Zhuangxi Chongtian Chengsheng
- Clan: Ji (紀)

Chinese name
- Chinese: 孝穆皇后
Transcriptions
Standard Mandarin
- Hanyu Pinyin: Xiàomù Huánghòu

Empress Xiaomu (died July 1475), of the Ji clan, (Note: Some sources state her surname as Li (李).) was an imperial consort of the Ming dynasty. She was a concubine of the Chenghua Emperor and mother of the Hongzhi Emperor. Captured during a military campaign against the Yao people in Guangxi, Lady Ji was brought to the imperial palace, where she became an imperial concubine. In 1470, she gave birth to a son, Zhu Youcheng. Due to the influence of the Emperor's favorite concubine, Lady Wan, his former empress Lady Wu and the palace eunuchs concealed the child's existence. The child remained hidden until 1475, when the Chenghua Emperor formally recognized him as his heir. Lady Ji died shortly after and was posthumously honored as empress after her son ascended the throne.

== Biography ==
Lady Ji's personal name and birth year are unknown. She was a member of the Yao people and came from He County, Guangxi. In 1467, the Ming army launched a punitive expedition against the rebellious Yao tribes in Guangxi, and some of the captives were taken as servants to the Forbidden City, including Lady Ji.

In 1469, Lady Ji met the Chenghua Emperor and became pregnant. Her pregnancy was discovered by Lady Wan, the Emperor's favorite concubine, who feared losing her position if another woman bore the Emperor a son. In order to prevent this, Lady Wan ordered the eunuchs to perform an abortion on Lady Ji, but the eunuchs did not comply and instead hid Lady Ji in the chambers of the former Empress Wu. It was there that Lady Ji gave birth to a boy on 30 July 1470. The secret remained hidden until June 1475, when a knowledgeable eunuch informed the Emperor about the existence of his five-year-old son. Upon receiving this news, the Emperor recognized his son and moved him to safety under the protection of his mother, Empress Dowager Zhou. The Emperor gave his son the name Zhu Youcheng.

One month later, Lady Ji died under suspicious circumstances. Some historians, such as Frederick Mote, have suggested that she was poisoned by an agent of Lady Wan. The Emperor then moved out of the palace occupied by Lady Wan and took measures to protect Zhu Youcheng from her influence. The Empress Dowager even warned the prince not to consume anything when visiting Lady Wan. The Emperor designated Zhu Youcheng as the heir to the throne.

The Chenghua Emperor posthumously granted Lady Ji the title Consort Shu with the posthumous name Gongkezhuangxi (恭恪莊僖). After the Chenghua Emperor died and Zhu Youcheng ascended the throne as the Hongzhi Emperor, he granted his mother the posthumous name "Empress Xiaomu Cihui Gongke Zhuangxi Chongtian Chengsheng Chun" (孝穆慈慧恭恪莊僖崇天承聖純皇后). In 1536, the Jiajing Emperor shortened her posthumous title to "Empress Xiaomu Cihui Gongke Zhuangxi Chongtian Chengsheng" (孝穆慈慧恭恪莊僖崇天承聖皇后), removing the character "Chun", which was the posthumous title of the Chenghua Emperor.
