= Liang Fang =

15th-century Chinese eunuch

Liang Fang (Note: Chinese: 梁芳; pinyin: Liáng Fāng) (fl. 15th century) was a Chinese eunuch who held a prominent position in the palace administration of the Chenghua Emperor of the Ming dynasty. He used his position to engage in corrupt activities and enrich himself, with the protection of the Emperor's favorite, Lady Wan.

== Biography ==
Liang Fang was born in Xinhui County, Guangdong, during China's Ming dynasty. In the mid-15th century, he became a eunuch in the Forbidden City in Beijing, likely serving Zhu Jianshen, the heir to the throne. In 1464, Zhu Jianshen ascended the throne as the Chenghua Emperor, and Liang quickly rose through the ranks.

By the 1470s, he was in charge of the wooden furniture and bookmaking department at the Forbidden City. With the support of Lady Wan, a favorite of the Chenghua Emperor, Liang gained even more influence. He was responsible for procuring expensive materials and issuing licenses to Tibetan and other foreign monks and experts in medicine and exotic practices, which presented numerous opportunities for wealth, from which Lady Wan greatly benefited.

Together with Lady Wan, they engaged in corrupt practices by selling government positions. Those who were interested in obtaining a position would purchase goods from the imperial storehouses, which were managed by Liang, at inflated prices. In return, they would be appointed to office directly by imperial decree, bypassing the qualification examinations of the Ministry of Personnel. This process was known as chuanfeng and involved a eunuch delivering the imperial order to the Grand Secretariat, who would then draft the appointment decree for the individual. Originally, this method was only used for appointing auxiliary personnel such as physicians, artists, carpenters, jewelers, astrologers, Taoist and Buddhist monks, and these appointments were always reviewed by the ministries. However, after 1475, there was a sudden increase in the number of appointments made through this process, with Lady Wan even dictating promotions to high offices.

In 1487, Lady Wan died and a few months later, the Chenghua Emperor also died. The new emperor, the Hongzhi Emperor, took action by transferring the eunuchs associated with Lady Wan to lower positions outside of Beijing or directly punishing them. Liang was among those affected.
