= Chenghua Emperor =

Emperor of China from 1464 to 1487

Chenghua Emperor 成化帝
- Palace portrait on a hanging scroll

Emperor of the Ming dynasty
- Reign: 23 February 1464 – 9 September 1487
- Enthronement: 28 February 1464
- Predecessor: Emperor Yingzong
- Successor: Hongzhi Emperor
- Born: 9 December 1447
- Died: 9 September 1487 (aged 39)
- Burial: Mao Mausoleum, Ming tombs, Beijing, China
- Consorts: Empress Wu (m. 1464; dep. 1464) Empress Xiaozhenchun (m. 1464) Empress Xiaomu (m. 1469; died 1475) Empress Xiaohui (before 1487)
- Issue Detail: Hongzhi Emperor; Zhu Youyuan, Prince of Xing
Era dates
- Chenghua: (Note: Chinese: 成化; pinyin: Chénghuà) 27 January 1465 – 13 January 1488
Posthumous name
- Emperor Jitian Ningdao Chengming Renjing Chongwen Suwu Hongde Shengxiao Chun (Note: Simplified Chinese: 继天凝道诚明仁敬崇文肃武宏德圣孝纯皇帝; traditional Chinese: 繼天凝道誠明仁敬崇文肅武宏德聖孝純皇帝 (conferred by the Hongzhi Emperor in 1487))
Temple name
- Xianzong (Note: Simplified Chinese: 宪宗; traditional Chinese: 憲宗; pinyin: Xiànzōng)
- House: Zhu
- Dynasty: Ming
- Father: Emperor Yingzong
- Mother: Lady Zhou

Chinese name
- Chinese: 成化帝
Transcriptions
Standard Mandarin
- Hanyu Pinyin: Chénghuà Dì
- Wade–Giles: Chʻêng^{2}-hua^{4} Ti^{4}
- IPA: [ʈʂʰə̌ŋ.xwâ tî]

The Chenghua Emperor (9 December 1447 – 9 September 1487), personal name Zhu Jianshen, (Note: Simplified Chinese: 朱见深; traditional Chinese: 朱見深; pinyin: Zhū Jiànshēn) changed to Zhu Jianru (Note: Simplified Chinese: 朱见濡; traditional Chinese: 朱見濡; pinyin: Zhū Jiànrú) in 1457, was the ninth emperor of the Ming dynasty of China, reigning from 1464 to 1487. He succeeded his father, Emperor Yingzong.

Zhu Jianshen was born during his father's first reign. When he was only two years old, Mongol forces captured his father during the Battle of Tumu Fortress, and his uncle ascended the throne as the Jingtai Emperor. During this time, Zhu Jianshen was appointed heir to the throne, but his uncle later removed him from the position. He was not reinstated as heir until 1457, when Emperor Yingzong overthrew the ailing Jingtai Emperor in a coup and reascended the throne.

The Chenghua Emperor began his reign at the age of sixteen. During the initial years of his reign, he implemented a new policy that included tax cuts and a focus on strengthening the state's power, but as time passed, the positive impact of these changes diminished. In the later years of his rule, the Forbidden City was dominated by court eunuchs, particularly the notorious Wang Zhi and Liang Fang. The Emperor's preference for favorites over promoting capable individuals gradually eroded the positive aspects of his rule. This resulted in widespread corruption and the enrichment of his supporters at the expense of the state treasury. Peasant uprisings erupted throughout the country and were brutally suppressed. The Emperor ruled with increasing autocracy, bolstering the secret police to monitor the sentiments of the people. Wan Zhen'er, a palace lady much older than the Chenghua Emperor, held significant sway over him and eventually became his favorite concubine. This was especially true after she gave birth to a son in 1466, although the child died shortly after. Lady Wan used her loyal eunuchs to force other women to have abortions if they became pregnant with the Emperor's child, and she did not hesitate to resort to poisoning mothers and their children. It was not until 1475 that the Emperor discovered the existence of his five-year-old son, Zhu Youcheng, who had been kept hidden until then. Zhu Youcheng later succeeded him as the Hongzhi Emperor.

The Chenghua Emperor was known for his military prowess and placed great emphasis on the strength of his army. During the 1470s, the reorganized Ming troops achieved notable triumphs in their battles against the Mongols, marking the first major victories since 1449. In addition, defensive walls were constructed in Shaanxi and Shanxi, laying the groundwork for the enduring Great Wall of China. The Ming also formed an alliance with Korea and effectively waged war against the Jurchen tribes in eastern Manchuria.

== Early life and accession ==
Zhu Jianshen, the future Chenghua Emperor, was born on 9 December 1447, as the eldest son of Emperor Yingzong, the sixth emperor of China's Ming dynasty, and his concubine surnamed Zhou. In 1449, the Mongols captured Emperor Yingzong in the Battle of Tumu Fortress. Emperor Yingzong's younger brother, Zhu Qiyu, took over the government. At the same time, Zhu Jianshen was appointed heir to the throne. A few days later, Zhu Qiyu ascended as the Jingtai Emperor. In 1450, the Mongols returned the captured Emperor Yingzong to the Ming, but the Jingtai Emperor put him under house arrest.

Zhu Jianshen remained heir until 1452, when his uncle demoted him to Prince of Yi (沂王). He lived separately from his parents in poor material conditions and began to stutter under the pressure of the situation. However, the new heir, the Jingtai Emperor's only son, died in 1453. The succession question remained open and Zhu Jianshen's position was uncertain until the Jingtai Emperor fell ill in late 1456. Emperor Yingzong's followers exploited this uncertainty, staging a coup in February 1457 and restoring Emperor Yingzong to the throne. On 1 March 1457, Emperor Yingzong reappointed Zhu Jianshen heir to the throne. He changed his son's name from Jianshen to Jianru, possibly because the original name, chosen by the Jingtai Emperor in 1449, was not acceptable to himself. (Note: The editors of History of Ming, without any support from primary sources, claimed that the original name of the Emperor was Jianru (見濬), but was later changed to Jianshen. Most Ming and Qing authors only refer to him as Jianshen, with the exception of Ming historians Wang Shizhen and Jiao Chong, who mistakenly wrote about a change from Jianshen to Jianji (the name of his cousin and son of the Jingtai Emperor). This uncertainty surrounding the Emperor's name suggests a lack of assertiveness and passivity on his part, as he is subject to the influence of those around him.)

Zhu Jianshen was often depicted by painters as robustly built, with full cheeks, sharp eyes, large earlobes, and a trimmed mustache and beard. These Central Asian features were also seen in portraits of his ancestors, going back to his great-great-grandfather. His son and successor, while also bearded, was smaller in stature, and other emperors were of a more slender, southern appearance. As a child, Zhu Jianshen was slow to react and had a stutter. This caused Emperor Yingzong to have doubts about his intelligence and ability to rule, but the grand secretaries, primarily Li Xian, convinced him to maintain the succession for his eldest son.

Emperor Yingzong died on 23 February 1464. The following day, a twelve-member imperial council was appointed to discuss government policies and advise the young emperor. The council consisted of six officials: Senior Grand Secretary Li Xian, the grand secretaries Peng Shi (彭時) and Chen Wen (陳文; 1405–1468), Minister of Personnel Wang Ao, Minister of Revenue Nian Fu (年富), Minister of War Ma Ang (馬昂; 1399–1476); four court eunuchs: Liu Yongcheng (劉永誠), Xia Shi (夏時), Fu Gong, and Niu Yu (牛玉); and two military generals: Sun Jizong (孫繼宗), Marquis of Huichang, (Note: Sun Jizong (1395–1480) was the brother of Empress Sun. He was given the title of Marquis of Huichang for his participation in the restoration of Emperor Yingzong in 1457. From 1457, he held the highest ceremonial position at court.) and Sun Tang (孫鏜), Marquis of Huaining. On 28 February 1464, he ascended the throne and adopted the era name Chenghua, which means "accomplished change".

When the Chenghua Emperor assumed control of the government, he was already under the influence of his favorite, Wan Zhen'er. She had previously been a servant of his grandmother, Empress Sun, and he catered to her every whim. Intelligent and determined, Wan started off as his nanny and eventually became his concubine. At the time of his ascension to the throne, she was 34 years old, twice the age of the seventeen-year-old emperor.

== The imperial household ==
=== Empress dowagers and empresses ===
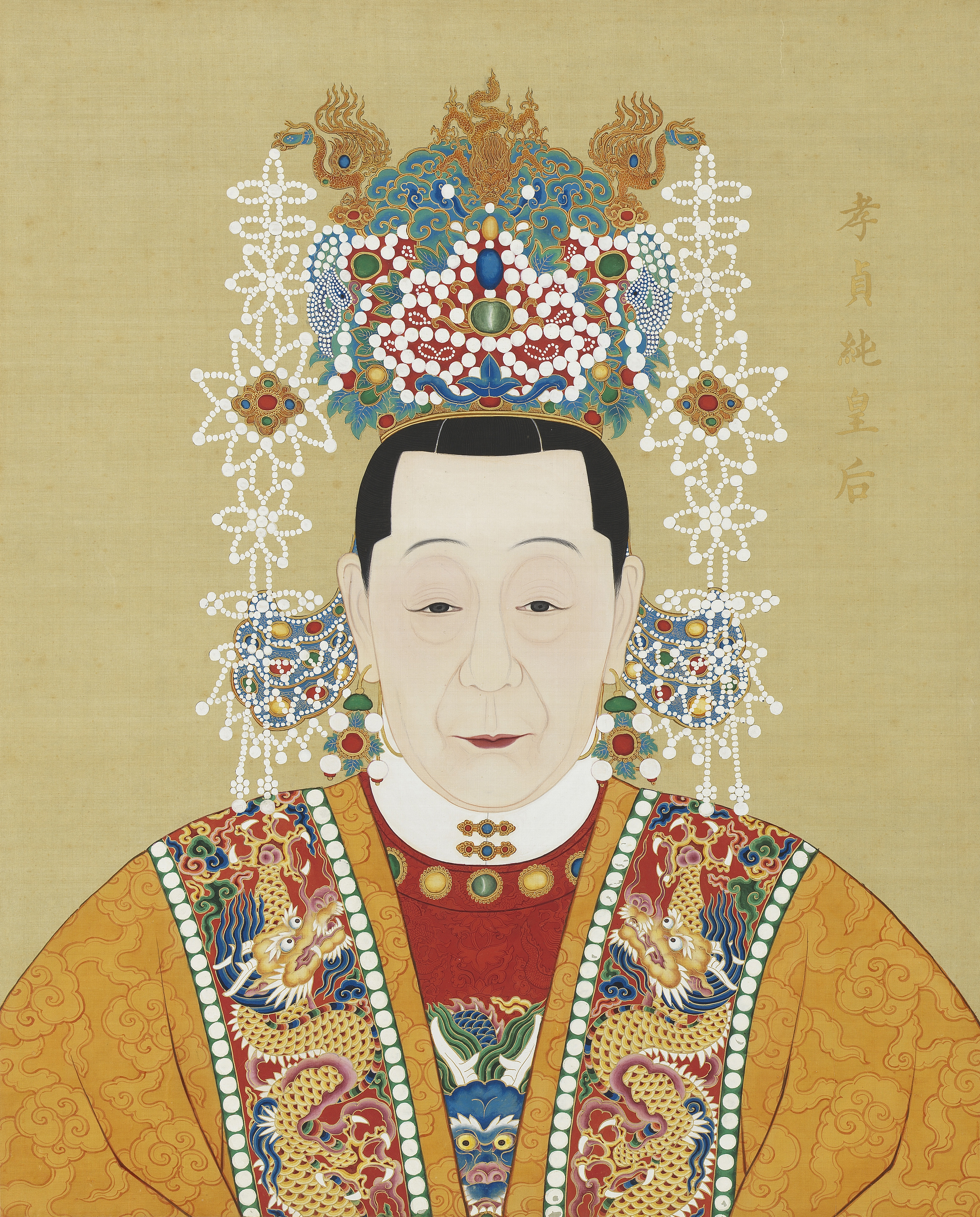
Portrait of Empress Wang, the Emperor's second empress

Conflicts among women within the Forbidden City had a negative impact on the Emperor's reputation. The first incident occurred on the day of his enthronement, when a dispute arose over the title of Emperor Yingzong's widow, Empress Qian. According to regulations, she should have become the empress dowager, but the Emperor's own mother, Lady Zhou, also claimed the same title. Despite being only a consort of Emperor Yingzong, she now held the status of mother to the reigning emperor and thus argued for the same title as Lady Qian. Lady Zhou also emphasized her loyalty to Emperor Yingzong, for which she had suffered alongside him during their years of house arrest from 1450–1457.

In the conflict between his mother and stepmother, the Emperor allowed the officials to express their opinions and secretly encouraged them to do so. However, he openly acted with apparent reluctance. Following the suggestions of Peng Shi and Li Xian, both women were given the title of empress dowager, with the addition of the characters Ciyi (慈懿) before it for Lady Qian. Lady Zhou perceived this as discrimination and consistently pushed for her equal rights. The young emperor eventually fled from the quarreling empresses and sought refuge with Lady Wan.

After ascending the throne in 1464, the Chenghua Emperor married Lady Wu as his empress, but their relationship was short-lived as Empress Wu soon clashed with Lady Wan and requested that Lady Wan be punished for her disrespect. Just one month after their wedding, the Emperor deposed Empress Wu and stripped her of her title. She spent the next 45 years in seclusion within the Forbidden City. In the same year, Lady Wang became the new empress. She was careful not to provoke Lady Wan and remained childless in order to protect herself from any potential misfortune.

=== The imperial heir ===
In 1466, Lady Wan bore the Emperor a son and was granted the title of "Noble Consort" (Guifei), but their son died within a year and Lady Wan did not have more children. In order to secure her position, she closely monitored the Emperor and even forced other women to have abortions to prevent the birth of a potential rival son. A few years later, with another concubine, the Emperor had a son who was named as his successor in December 1471, but the child died shortly afterward. Historians generally suspect that Lady Wan was responsible for the death of this child.

The court and government were greatly troubled by the absence of an heir and the influence of Lady Wan. Officials expressed their concerns to the Emperor in submissions, but he dismissed them as meddling in his personal matters. It was not until June 1475, when the Emperor lamented his lack of an heir at the age of twenty-eight, that a eunuch present impulsively informed him of the existence of a five-year-old son being raised by the former Empress Wu.

A few years earlier, the Emperor had an affair with a girl surnamed Ji from Guangxi, who was likely a captive of the Yao tribe and brought to the palace around 1467. In 1469, she met the Emperor and became pregnant. Lady Wan discovered the pregnancy, but her orders for the eunuchs to give the mother an abortifacient were not followed. Instead, they hid her in the chambers of Lady Wu's dissecting room, where she gave birth to a boy on 30 July 1470. For the next five years, the mother and child lived in secrecy with Lady Wu.

The Emperor, who was very enthusiastic about his son, recognized him and named him Zhu Youcheng. He then entrusted his mother, Empress Dowager Zhou, with overseeing the child's safety. A month later, Lady Ji died under suspicious circumstances. (Note: According to historian Frederick W. Mote, Lady Wan's agent poisoned Lady Ji.) The Emperor then moved out of the palace occupied by Lady Wan and protected his heir from her. Empress Dowager Zhou warned her grandson not to eat or drink anything when visiting Lady Wan.

=== Lady Wan's camarilla ===
The Emperor's relationship with Lady Wan changed after 1475, as he had five consorts and a total of eleven sons and six daughters between 1476 and 1487. Despite no longer living with Lady Wan, the Emperor remained devoted to her and may have tried to make up for his absence by supporting her activities. During the latter part of his reign, he rarely restricted her actions, even when they were illegal. Her agents were involved in various activities, such as mining for copper, silver, gold, and precious stones in Yunnan, foreign trade, pearl gathering in Guangdong, tax collection along the Yangtze River, and the salt trade. In 1483, one of her eunuchs was so arrogant while purchasing antiques in Suzhou that local officials and gentry were almost provoked to take up arms. Upon learning of his misconduct, the Emperor had him executed. Her chief eunuch, Liang Fang, was in charge of the imperial warehouse in Beijing, giving him the opportunity to sell goods at inflated prices to cover up the sale of offices organized by Lady Wan.

Despite numerous complaints, the Emperor did not punish Lady Wan for her actions. He punished officials who spoke out against her abuse of power, excessive spending, and corruption. She maintained significant influence until her death in 1487.

Another notorious eunuch during the Chenghua era was Wang Zhi (汪直), a Yao-born man who was captured and castrated during the counterinsurgency campaigns of the 1460s. He initially served as a servant to Lady Wan, but only held minor positions until he was put in charge of the Western Depot in 1477. This secret police force was created to supplement the already-established Eastern Depot. Wang Zhi soon clashed with Grand Secretary Shang Lu and Minister of War Xiang Zhong (項忠), leading to their dismissal. During this time, only those who were closely aligned with Lady Wan or those who remained silent were able to keep their positions. Wang Zhi terrorized the elite of Beijing for several years before being sent to inspect border troops in 1482. In 1483, his rival from the Eastern Depot presented accusations that gained the Emperor's trust, resulting in Wang being transferred to guard the imperial tombs in Nanjing.

== Economy and culture ==
=== Trade, crafts, and finance ===
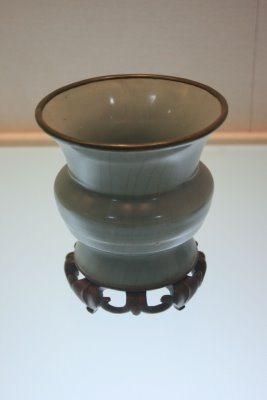
A porcelain vase of the Chenghua era. Nanjing Museum

After a long period of economic depression, the economy of China and its neighboring countries began to recover in the second half of the 15th century. This was largely due to the increase in precious metal mining, which saw a slight rise in China, Southeast Asia, and West Africa, and a significant increase in Europe. There was a surge in the import of Eastern goods such as pepper, spices, and porcelain to Central Asia, the Middle East, and Europe. (Note: For example, Lorenzo de' Medici acquired his first piece of Chinese porcelain in 1487.) In China, the Jingdezhen porcelain factories resumed production, leading to a flourishing trade on the southeast coast. Not only did Ming pottery regain its popularity in Asian and African markets, but it also made its way to Europe in the 1480s. The products from the Chenghua era of Jingdezhen are considered some of the finest examples of Ming porcelain in terms of design and decoration. Of particular significance is the development of doucai (鬥彩; literally meaning 'contrasted colors'), which was highly admired and imitated in the following century.

Trade was further bolstered by the rapid development of transportation, which was spurred by a surge in bridge construction following the devastating floods in central and southern China in 1465. This led to the growth of the silk industry in the 1470s and 1480s, with silk production shifting from urban centers to rural areas in Jiangnan. Silk was woven in "every village" around Lake Tai. The economic boom brought about significant changes, including the expansion of cities and commerce, particularly in the southern and southeastern regions. This was further supported by the increase in foreign trade after 1470 and the influx of Japanese silver. The economy became increasingly monetized.

Since the closure of the mints in the 1430s, there had been a shortage of copper coins. This created an opportunity for counterfeiters to thrive. Although there were occasional proposals to combat private coinage by resuming state minting, they were ultimately rejected. Illegal mints flourished and their "new coins" began to replace the old Yongle coppers in Beijing markets. These private coins were of poorer quality, often containing tin or iron admixture that was visibly different from the genuine coins. Due to the scarcity of the old mintages, merchants had no choice but to use these counterfeits, even though they were only worth 1/2 to 1/3 of their face value. Some merchants refused to accept Ming coins altogether, while others only accepted silver. This led to workers being paid in low-quality coins, resulting in them losing half of their real income. Coins began to disappear from circulation and the government, similar to earlier banknotes, attempted to support their value by requiring payments to be made in them. Starting in 1465, it became possible to pay commercial fees in both banknotes and coins, but the government refused to release coins from the treasury or mint new ones.

The issue of money also had a significant impact on foreign trade during this time. The Japanese missions of 1468, 1477, and 1483 were characterized by the Japanese's persistent efforts to return to the conditions of the Yongle Emperor's rule, when they were able to exchange their goods for coppers at a more favorable rate than what was available in the market. However, the Ming authorities had a different goal—to minimize payments in coins and instead use silk and other goods as currency. They also tried to force the Japanese to accept the "new coins" at face value, which the Japanese viewed as theft. Coins were mainly obtained in Japan through fraudulent trade.

=== Agriculture ===
Despite advancements in trade, crafts, and urbanization, agriculture in the Ming dynasty was struggling. The population was rapidly growing, but a colder climate in the late 15th century hindered the success of peasant farmers. (Note: American historian William Atwell associates the cold climate with a high level of volcanic activity in the second half of the 15th century.) This led to widespread famines in northern and central China, particularly in the 1460s, and soaring food prices—by the early 1470s, rice was two and a half times more expensive than it was in the 1430s. (Note: In the 1430s, 1 dan of rice (107.4 liters) cost 0.25 liang of silver; by the early 1470s, it had risen to 0.6 liang. One liang weighed 37.301 grams.) Banditry also became a major issue, even on the outskirts of the capital. (Note: Security problems around the capital were caused by several factors specific to the metropolitan area. Crime was fueled by the contrast between rural poverty and relative urban prosperity; the concentration of tens of thousands of poorly paid undisciplined soldiers who robbed the population instead of protecting them, and the presence of many thousands of eunuchs who failed to get a job in the imperial palace and lived on the fringes of society.) In an effort to assist the population, the government implemented measures such as constructing irrigation canals and providing millet from state reserves (Note: 100 thousand dan of grain were released.) during the famine in the Beijing area. They also offered displaced peasants the opportunity to return to their homes, potentially with temporary housing, as well as seed, livestock, and a five-year tax exemption.

During the Chenghua era, the size of the imperial estates (皇莊) grew from a small area to over 80,000 hectares. By the beginning of the 16th century, they had increased sixteen times. The revenues from these estates were the emperor's personal income, but the existence of such private estates drew disapproval from officials. One censor even objected, questioning why the emperor was competing with landowners when he already owned the entire country. These vast estates were acquired by the emperor, the empresses, the heir to the throne, imperial relatives, eunuchs, and various favorites. This expansion of estates, similar to the imperial estates, had negative effects on the original landowners who were forced to become tenants, as well as on the state treasury. Not only did the emperor and his entourage benefit from this, but also wealthy landowners who took advantage of the situation at the expense of small peasants. This was particularly evident in Jiangnan, where in contrast to the early Ming period, the government had previously restricted and closely monitored the growth of large landowners.

=== Culture ===
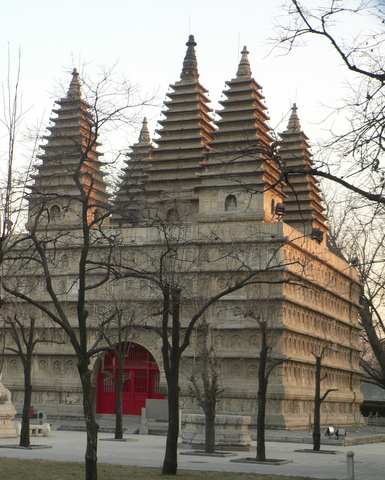
The 1473 Zhenjue Buddhist Temple was constructed in an unconventional "Diamond Throne Pagoda" architectural style, influenced by the Mahabodhi Temple in India.

The Emperor was renowned for his skill in calligraphy, as evidenced by his surviving work, a color scroll painting from 1481 depicting the mythological demon warrior Zhong Kui, titled Sui chao jia zhao (歲朝佳兆). He also had a passion for theater and music, and even had his own troupe of eunuch actors. In 1478, he composed several poems that have since been lost. In 1483, he wrote the preface for Wenhua daxun (文華大訓; 'Great Lessons for the Palace of Literary Splendor'), a collection of instructions for his successor. The Emperor also showed support for Buddhism, as seen in his order for the construction of five pagodas in the Indian style west of Beijing in 1473. These pagodas are believed to be the only ones of their kind in the Beijing area.

However, the majority of Confucians held a negative attitude towards Buddhism and its methods of cultivating one's personality. This was exemplified by Hu Juren (胡居仁), a prominent Neo-Confucian during that period. Another influential figure in the intellectual community at the time was Chen Baisha, a scholar from Guangdong who mentored many significant scholars and officials.

== Government and administration ==
=== Relations with officials ===
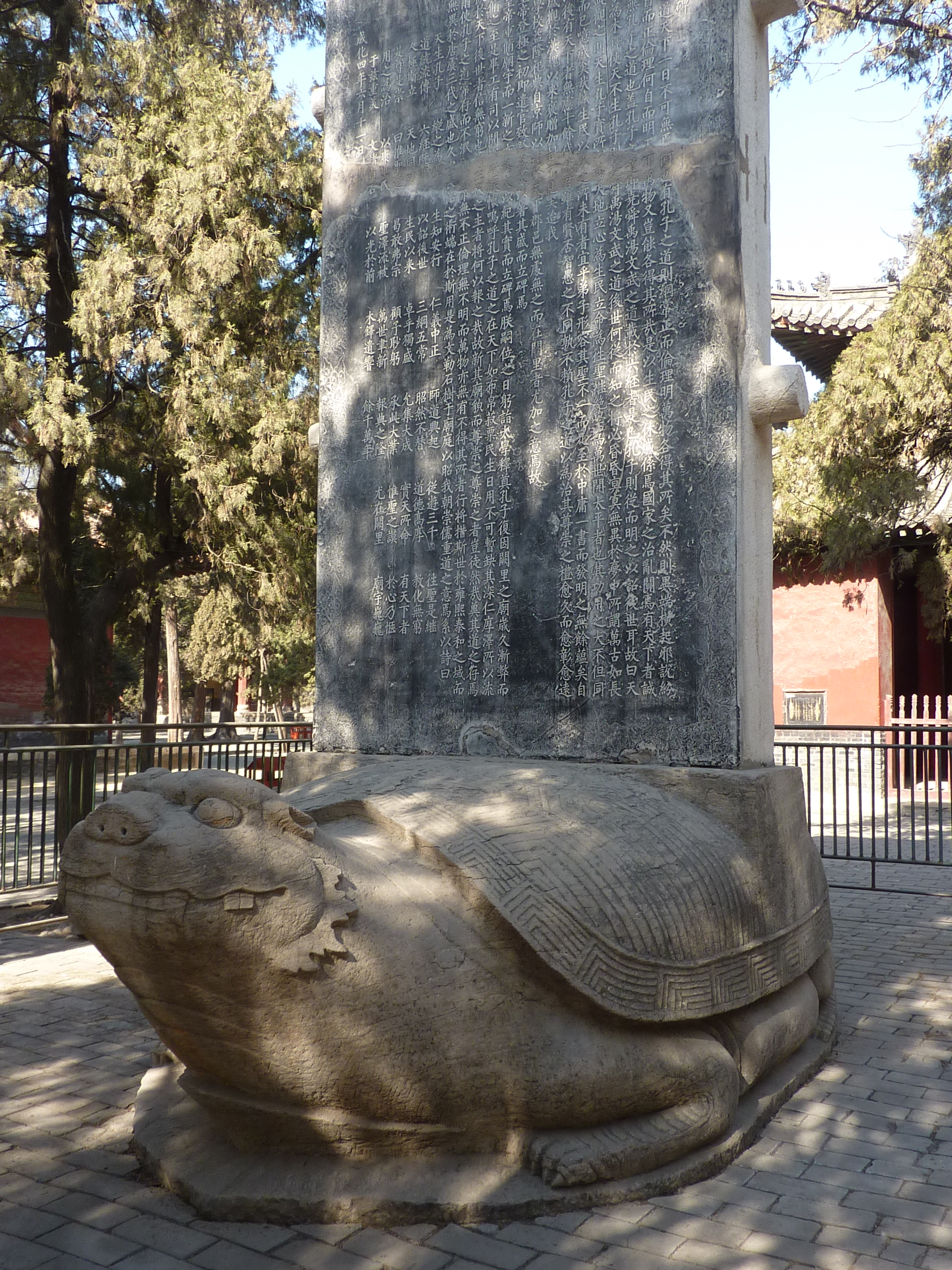
A stele erected in 1468 to commemorate the renovation of the Temple of Confucius in Qufu.

The Chenghua Emperor was known for his generosity and lack of desire for revenge, even for the wrongs he may have experienced in his childhood. He was widely praised for his efforts to restore the reputation of those who had been unfairly treated in the past, and he also implemented measures to aid areas that were suffering from famine. However, in 1468, the Emperor did order for three Hanlin academics to be beaten after they got into a dispute with Empress Dowager Zhou over the decoration of the Lantern Festival. This was a rare occurrence, as the Chenghua Emperor generally did not resort to physical punishment for dignitaries, unlike other emperors of the dynasty.

In both military and civilian affairs, the Chenghua Emperor relied on the advice of the grand secretaries and ministers. He highly valued honest and capable officials, but he also allowed Lady Wan to promote unsuitable individuals. This led to a lack of decisiveness on his part, as he would briefly align himself with one side or the other during government discussions. His efforts to reconcile differences among factions did help to reduce conflicts, although there was still some tension between northerners and southerners, with the Emperor showing slight favoritism towards the latter. Out of the three grand secretaries during the Chenghua Emperor's ascension to the throne, only Li Xian was from the north, while Chen Wen and Peng Shi were from Jiangxi.

After 1464, the most influential figure in the government was the Grand Secretary Li Xian, who had already wielded considerable power during the final years of Emperor Yingzong's reign. Li Xian strategically appointed capable and respected individuals to important positions within the administration. His influence was not perceived as excessive, as he prioritized open discussion when making decisions. He consistently sought input from both civil servants and military officers when making personnel decisions.

The original grand secretaries were gradually replaced by the brilliant scholars Liu Tingzhi (劉定之; d. 1469) and Shang Lu (dismissed in 1477), but the Emperor also appointed the opportunistic and unprincipled Wan An (萬安; d. 1489) and Liu Ji (劉吉; d. 1493) to the Grand Secretariat. In the later years of the Chenghua Emperor's reign, the infamous eunuchs Wang Zhi and Liang Fang held powerful positions. Lady Wan's supporters also had a negative reputation. Under their influence, the Emperor distanced himself from his officials, causing them to wait for years for a personal audience with him.

=== Growth of the eunuch bureaucracy ===
During the 15th century, the number of eunuchs in the imperial palace increased significantly, with a growing number of them serving in both civil and military roles, as well as in the provinces. By the end of the century, there were over 10,000 eunuchs in service, nearly equaling the number of regular civil servants. In the following century, their numbers even surpassed those of regular civil servants.

Eunuchs held a significant role in military affairs, overseeing the purchase of horses from abroad and the majority of (tributary) foreign trade, as well as the production of weapons, state production of silk, brocade, and porcelain, procurement and transportation of court supplies, management of the palace and imperial tombs. They also controlled the secret service, whose actions often gave rise to complaints. Protests against the abuses of the secret service, which caused fear of arrest and torture among officials, merchants, and ordinary citizens in the capital, were unsuccessful. On the contrary, they furthered the careers of minister Xiang Zhong and Grand Secretary Shang Lu.

The management of military affairs, foreign trade, state industries, court provisions, imperial properties, and the secret service was handled by the eunuch bureaucracy independently from the civilian authorities. Under the Chenghua Emperor's reign, it expanded and strengthened and its power began to be formally recognized—an example of this was the appointment of eunuchs to the imperial council formed after the death of Emperor Yingzong. An example of the growing power of the eunuchs was the system of reviewing court cases. This was carried out by the "three judicial offices", namely the Censorate, the Ministry of Justice, and the Court of Judicature and Revision. Every autumn, they reviewed death sentences and either confirmed, mitigated, or sent them back for further investigation. From the 1440s, eunuchs sometimes represented the Emperor in meetings, and during the Chenghua era, their influence continued to increase and they did not hesitate to assert their opinions against the grand secretaries and officials in these meetings.

== Military and foreign policy ==
=== The imperial army ===
The Chenghua Emperor looked up to his military-minded grandfather and father, the Xuande Emperor and Emperor Yingzong, as his role models. He followed an active military policy and generously rewarded his generals, appointing nine counts and one marquis for their achievements.

During the Chenghua era, the Ming army was organized into approximately 500 guards (wei) under the Weisuo system, with each guard consisting of battalions (suo) spread throughout the empire. Theoretically, these guards were supposed to have 3 million soldiers, but in reality, the number was only about half of that. These guards were overseen by Five Chief Military Commissions. Additionally, there were over 70 guard units of Imperial Guards stationed in and around Beijing, theoretically adding another million men to the army. However, their actual numbers were much lower, as many of their soldiers were employed as laborers and tens of thousands of supernumerary officers were appointed and paid. Unlike the guards under the Five Chief Military Commissions, the Imperial Guards were not subject to their authority. They were also exempt from the nine defense areas along the northern border, which had approximately 300,000 soldiers who were better trained and supplied than the inland units.

In the late 15th century, the military competence of hereditary officers had significantly declined and their ties to the throne had weakened compared to the beginning of the century. Instead of inexperienced second- or third titled generation descendants of once successful generals, military matters were now overseen by civilian officials and eunuchs who were committed to military careers. These armies were led by officials who were also involved in military affairs, including Han Yong (韓雍; 1422–1478), Wang Yue (王越; 1426–1499), Xiang Zhong (1421–1502), and Ma Wensheng (馬文升; 1426–1510).

=== Military reforms ===
After ascending to the throne, the Chenghua Emperor implemented a new system of selecting officers through special examinations, but in the 1470s, there was a rise in the use of military trials. Concurrently, the Emperor initiated significant changes to the military training of the Beijing garrison units. Previously, soldiers from various provinces were sent to the Three Great Camps (三大營) for training: Wujun (五軍營) for infantry, Sanqian (三千營) for cavalry, and Shenji (神機營) for units equipped with firearms. In May 1464, the Emperor ordered the reinstatement of a unified training corps (which had previously existed from 1449 to 1457) and divided it into twelve divisions (十二團營), each consisting of ten thousand soldiers. These soldiers were selected from a pool of over 300,000 individuals from the three camps, with the majority being sent back to their respective provinces.

The purpose of this measure was to train infantry, cavalry, and units armed with firearms to work together in mixed divisions. Previously, these groups had been trained separately in three different camps. Marquis Sun Jizong was in overall command of these divisions, but the military side was actually led by eunuch Liu Yongcheng, a 73-year-old veteran from the Yongle Emperor's reign. Each division also had a deputy commander, known as Jian qiang nei chen (監鎗內臣; 'Armory-inspecting Eunuch'), who was a eunuch and in charge of firearms. The Emperor's most trusted personnel were responsible for closely guarding the firearms. Starting in the mid-1470s, the divisions were completely under the control of eunuchs, likely due to the influence of Wang Zhi.

The newly trained Beijing corps played a crucial role in successful campaigns on the northern frontier, defeating the Mongols in 1471, 1473, and 1480, as well as the Jurchens in 1467 and 1479. Their reputation as fierce and ruthless soldiers earned them the responsibility of being on alert in case of an uprising in western Shaanxi in 1478. On the advice of Peng Shi, they remained in Beijing, as he was concerned about the safety of the civilian population if they were deployed. Despite this, small detachments were still sent to combat the insurgent Yao tribes in Guangxi. As time went on, the corps began to weaken as it was used for both public and private labor, leading to criticism. Nevertheless, during the early Chenghua era, it remained a strong and effective force.

=== Rebellions in the South-West frontier ===
The Yao rebellion in Guangxi, led by tribal leader Hou Dagou (侯大狗), had been brewing since the 1450s and broke out in 1464. At the same time, the Miao and Zhuang also rebelled. The center of the rebellion was in the mountainous landscape 120–160 km northwest of the seat of Xunzhou Prefecture (present-day Guiping). The rebels surprised the Chinese by bringing the fighting from the mountains to the densely populated coastal areas of Guangdong. The rebellion and troop movements also spread to southern Huguang, Guizhou, and Jiangxi. Local dignitaries hoped to placate the Yao with amnesty and donations, but Minister of War Wang Hong (王竑) decided on a forceful response. He appointed Zhao Fu (趙輔) to lead the expeditionary army, but the army was actually led by his deputy Han Yong, the new Governor of Guangdong. They had 30,000 soldiers at their disposal, including a thousand of the feared Mongol mounted archers, and 160,000 local forces. In 1466, Han Yong attacked the heart of the rebel territory in two columns drawn from Huguang from the north and from Guangdong from the west, and conquered them in a series of fierce battles. The pacification of the region took several more years. Han Yong, who remained in the south until 1468, reorganized local administration by establishing a new county, strengthening coordination between the Guangdong and Guangxi authorities, and incorporating Yao chieftains into Ming administration.

Hou Dagou's rebellion was one of the strongest uprisings among the minority peoples of the southwest in the late 15th century, but it was not the only one. In the following years, the Miao and Yao also rebelled in different parts of southwestern China. Li Zhen (李震), a hereditary guard commander, repeatedly defeated them on the border of Guizhou and Huguang, instilling fear and terror among the subjugated areas. In 1467 and again in 1475–1476, he and his army slaughtered thousands of Miao rebels. Another rebellion occurred on the border of Guizhou and Sichuan from 1466 to 1468, and the Minister of War, Cheng Xin (程信), was sent to suppress it. However, the rebellion resurfaced in 1477–1480. In the 1460s and 1470s, a series of Miao rebellions erupted in southern Sichuan and were forcefully suppressed by the governor, Zhang Gang (張剛). He alternately fought against the Miao in the south of the province and the Tibetans in the northwest.

Even the Zhuangs rebelled, with their use of poisoned arrows causing fear among warriors. They were employed against the Yao during battles with Hou Dagou. By the end of the 15th century, the Zhuangs had rebelled twice against Ming rule.

=== Jingxiang rebellion ===
The Jingxiang rebellion of 1465–1476 was the most significant uprising in China during the 15th century. It was also considered the most significant social upheaval in the Ming state between the civil war of 1399–1402 and the Li Zicheng rebellion in the final years of the Ming dynasty. The rebellion was named after the prefectures of Jingzhou and Xiangyang, located in the northwestern region of Huguang.

During the early Ming period, the prefectures of Jingzhou and Xiangyang were largely uninhabited, but starting in the 1430s, they began to see an influx of illegal immigrants. In the 1460s, famines repeatedly struck northern China and the lower and middle regions of the Yangtze River, leading to an increase in the number of refugees in the Jingxiang region. It is estimated that there were less than two million refugees living independently from the state. These refugees were led by Liu Tong (劉通), who united small bands of robbers and declared himself the King of Han. He then proceeded to establish his own administration and organize an army of ten thousand soldiers. The government sent troops led by Zhu Yong (朱永), Count of Funing, and Bai Gui (白圭), Minister of Works. In 1465, these troops gathered from various provinces, including Li Zhen's troops from Huguang, and successfully crushed the rebellion. Liu Tong himself was captured in the summer of 1466.

The issue of weak official administration persisted, and in 1470, an additional 900,000 individuals migrated to the region due to famine, sparking a new rebellion. Xiang Zhong, the chief censor at the time, was tasked with quelling the uprising. He enlisted the assistance of Li Zhen and raised an army of 250,000 in Huguang province. Together, they successfully suppressed the rebellion, resulting in the execution of hundreds, the exile of thousands, and the return of 1.5 million individuals to their respective homelands.

People began to return to the region and in the summer of 1476, they rebelled once again. The government sent Yuan Jie (原傑), (Note: Yuan Jie (原傑, 1417–1477) was a jinshi (進士) in 1445 and held high positions in the Censorate in the 1470s.) a censor, to investigate the social and economic conditions in the area. This sparked a lively discussion in the court about potential solutions to the problem. Ultimately, the government decided to address the issues through social and organizational measures in the region and entrusted Yuan Jie with their implementation. He recognized the rights of immigrants to the land they cultivated and registered over 113,000 families with 438,000 members. As per his suggestion, several new counties were established and by the end of 1476, the new prefecture of Yunyang was formed. In the seat of the new prefecture, a defense military command was established with jurisdiction over the adjacent counties of neighboring provinces. In just one year, Yuan Jie successfully stabilized the situation and brought calm to the region through proper administration.

=== Foreign policy and the attempted conquest of Hami ===
The Ming presence beyond China's borders was merely symbolic, limited to granting titles, ranks, and trade privileges without interfering in the daily lives of those affected. States and tribes to the north and northwest of Ming China were eager to engage in trade and commerce with the Ming, resulting in an increase in the number and frequency of tribute messages. However, the Mongols were not hesitant to resort to raiding in order to expand trade and acquire more iron, grain, handicrafts, and luxury goods, much to the dismay of the Chinese. While Ming titles could lend legitimacy to the rule of the recipient and grant them the right to engage in tributary relations, the Ming government was not obligated to provide any official authority over their subjects, as they did in China. Despite this, the Chinese were still keen on expanding their influence and prestige in the northern steppes.

During the Chenghua Emperor's reign, the Ming dynasty's interests in Central Asia were limited to attempting to gain control of Hami, a Silk Road city located in present-day Xinjiang. The Uighur rulers of Hami were followers of Islam and acknowledged Ming sovereignty, receiving the title of wang (king) from the Ming emperors. In the early 1470s, the ruler of Hami was killed by a prince from Moghulistan who declared himself the Sultan of Turpan and immediately engaged in conflict with the "pagan" (non-Muslim) Oirats. This fighting occurred in the northwest region of his territory, specifically in the Ili Valley. In Beijing, ministers have been discussing whether to address the clashes and unrest in Hami through military action or diplomatic means (such as cutting ties).

In 1473, the Ming attempted to reinstate the previous government in Hami. A small Chinese force was dispatched, with the support of two Mongol tribes who were the largest allies of the Ming in the region between China and Hami. The Mongols, numbering 30,000, joined the Chinese in their mission. Upon reaching Hami, however, they discovered that the enemy's army had already passed them, causing the Mongols to retreat and defend their own territories. The Chinese detachment was easily defeated by the Turpans. It was not until the early 1490s that the Chinese once again became involved in the situation in Hami.

=== Wars with the Mongols and Jurchens ===
In Manchuria, there were 384 Jurchen tribal chiefs who held formal Ming titles as guard commanders. In 1465 and 1479, the Chenghua Emperor launched attacks against the Jurchens, utilizing the restored Ming military power. These campaigns were aided by Korean troops and proved successful in weakening the Jianzhou Jurchens, (Note: The Chinese during the Ming period classified the Jurchens into three distinct groups—the Wild (Yeren) in northern Manchuria and along the Amur River, the Haixi in central Manchuria (around Harbin and in the Sungari River basin), and the Jianzhou in southern Manchuria.) leaving them divided until the early 17th century.

Due to the complex and ever-changing political landscape in Mongolia, the Chinese had only a vague understanding of the situation. In the latter half of the 15th century, the Mongols were divided into several groups: the Uriankhai in the north and northeast of the Beijing area, the Tumed Mongols in the north of Shanxi, and the Ordos Mongols in the Ordos region north of Shaanxi. The Chinese referred to the population living behind these groups as Tatars. Additionally, there were a number of small principalities along the Sino-Mongol border and the Silk Road in the northwest. Among all the Mongol groups, the Uriankhai were the most stable and had the closest relationship with the Ming dynasty.

In 1468, the Mongols rebelled in Guyuan, a border headquarters located between Xi'an and Lanzhou. The local Mongols had been settled there since the late 1460s and were under the rule of their own hereditary chiefs. In June 1468, for unknown reasons, they rose up and fortified themselves in the mountains north of the city, successfully defeating the local Ming troops. The government sent an army led by Xiang Zhong and Ma Wensheng, who was then the chief censor and governor of Shaanxi. By the fall of 1468, the army had successfully eliminated the rebels within a few months, with the last of them being defeated in early 1469.

The Guyuan incident raised concerns among some Beijing dignitaries about the presence of Mongols in Chinese territory and their potential connections with Mongols across the border and even with Tibetans. In 1468 and 1469, invaders from Mongolia attacked Yulin, further emphasizing the danger to the reorganized Beijing garrison. The commanders of the garrison were eager for battle in order to test their troops and gain glory and booty, but they faced opposition from the grand secretaries Peng Shi and Shang Lu, who argued that the rebellion had already been defeated.

The responsibility for resolving the situation was given to Wang Yue, (Note: Wang Yue (1426–1499) was a civil official and served as the governor of Datong until 1469.) the most capable follower of the war party associated with eunuchs and courtiers. He was transferred to Yulin at the end of 1469. In 1470, Wang successfully defeated the Mongol invaders in a series of battles. Bai Gui, an opponent of the war party and now minister of war, sent Yu Zijun (余子俊) (Note: Yu Zijun (1429–1489) was a brilliant scholar, jinshi at the age of 21, and a capable administrator who excelled in organizing large water projects in Fujian.) to the area as governor (he remained in office until 1477). Together, Yu Zijun and Wang Yue were able to stabilize the situation. While Wang was defeating the Mongols in the field (in 1471 and 1473), Yu planned the construction of a defensive wall at Ordos. Despite concerns about the cost, the government eventually gave permission in 1474. Within a few months, 40,000 soldiers built a 1777 li (1000 km) long wall, standing 9 meters high and equipped with numerous towers and other supporting structures. This wall proved effective in a major attack during the summer of 1482.

Nevertheless, Mongol raids continued after that. At the end of the 15th century, the Mongol power was partly restored by Batumöngke, the Great Khan of the Mongols from 1480. Under his leadership, the Mongols renewed their attacks on Chinese territory, nullifying the Ming victories of the 1470s.

== Death and legacy ==
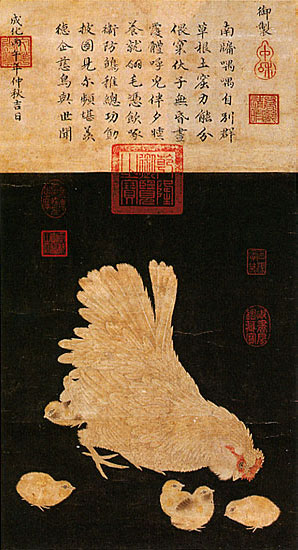
A Song dynasty (960–1279) painting of a mother hen and chicks, with a written eulogy at the top inscribed by the Chenghua Emperor describing his fondness for this work.

The Chenghua Emperor died on 9 September 1487 and was buried in Mao Mausoleum (茂陵). He was given the posthumous name Emperor Chun (純皇帝) and the temple name Xianzong (憲宗). He was succeeded by his eldest surviving son, Zhu Youcheng, who became known as the Hongzhi Emperor.

In both military and civil affairs, the Emperor is highly regarded for his willingness to listen to the advice of capable politicians, such as Li Xian and Peng Shi. This helped to keep dissensions between regional cliques of officials at a manageable level. The Chenghua era was a time of significant political and cultural transition, marked by the increasing dominance of civil officials over the military, the growing influence of the southern region, and the shift of the cultural center from Jiangxi to the lower reaches of the Yangtze River.

However, the Emperor cannot be absolved of responsibility for selling offices to the clique around Lady Wan and the eunuchs. Many of those appointed were his favorites. While the Emperor's cautious and phlegmatic nature prevented him from being completely controlled by anyone, Lady Wan and some eunuchs took advantage of his favor for personal gain.

Nevertheless, despite the excesses of the eunuchs, his reign is considered one of the most prosperous periods in Ming history. The eunuchs' actions were offset by long-term benefits, the most significant being the expansion into Yao tribal territory in Guangdong and Guangxi. This allowed for control over the Xi River valley and its tributaries, providing opportunities for transportation and settlement. Additionally, military expeditions to Luzhou in 1465 successfully eliminated the threat posed by natives in Sichuan, ensuring safe passage along the Yangtze River. Military reforms were also implemented, strengthening the army but also increasing the influence of eunuchs, who often held high-ranking positions. Several successful attacks weakened the Jurchens, and they posed no significant threat for the next century. In 1474, the construction of the 1000 km long Great Wall in Shanxi further fortified the defense against the Mongols in the bend of the Yellow River.

== See also ==
- Chinese emperors family tree (late)

== Notes ==
Chenghua Emperor House of Zhu Born: 9 December 1447 Died: 9 September 1487
Regnal titles
| Preceded by Emperor Yingzong | Emperor of the Ming dynasty 23 February 1464 – 9 September 1487 | Succeeded by Hongzhi Emperor |
Chinese royalty
| Vacant Title last held by Zhu Qizhen | Crown Prince of the Ming dynasty (First tenure); 1449–1452 | Succeeded by Zhu Jianji |
| New creation | Prince of Yi; 1452–1457 | Reinstated as the heir |
| Vacant Title last held by Zhu Jianji | Crown Prince of the Ming dynasty (Second tenure); 1457–1464 | Vacant Title next held by Zhu Youcheng |
