= Jingxiang rebellion =

Rebellion in Ming China (1465–1476)

The Jingxiang rebellion (Note: Also known as the Yunyang rebellion, named after the prefecture created in late 1476 to restore effective governance in the affected region.) refers to a series of rebellions that occurred between 1465 and 1476 in the Ming dynasty of China, during the reign of the Chenghua Emperor. These rebellions took place in the prefectures of Jingzhou and Xiangyang, located in the northeast of Huguang in central China. The rebellions were led by illegal immigrants who had settled in these peripheral areas of Huguang and sought to establish their own independent organization separate from the Ming state. Despite repeated defeats by the Ming army, the situation was eventually resolved through the recognition of the immigrants' right to the land they occupied and the implementation of proper state administration in the affected territory.

== Background ==
The Jingxiang region was named after the prefectures of Jingzhou and Xiangyang located in the northwestern corner of Huguang in central China. These prefectures were vast, spanning over 300 km in all directions, and despite a considerable amount of mountainous terrain, they were fertile. During the Tang and Song dynasties, the region was densely populated and in close proximity to the political center of the empire. However, after the invasions and struggles of the Yuan period, the region was largely depopulated in the 14th century and became a refuge for displaced people.

After the founding of the Ming dynasty, the general Deng Yu conquered the region in 1369–1370 and brought it under Ming administration. The new government prohibited immigration there. Over the next few decades, the area remained sparsely populated and relatively peaceful. In the 1430s, famine-stricken individuals from Henan began to flee to the region. This influx of people led to an increase in population and the formation of independent communities.

In the 1450s and 1460s, hundreds of thousands of illegal immigrants, including refugees fleeing hunger, taxes, and the law, arrived in the Jingxiang region. By the mid-1460s, the population had reached two million. These individuals were not registered in official records (Yellow Registers), did not pay taxes, and lived independently from the state.

== Rebellions of 1465–1466 and 1470 ==
In the 1460s, Liu Tong (劉通), an immigrant leader and strongman nicknamed Thousand-catties Liu (劉千斤), emerged with the assistance of the monk Shi Long (石龍), nicknamed "Monk Shi (石和尚). Liu united several small bandit groups and declared himself King of Han (漢王) with the era name of Desheng (德勝; loosely translated as "Virtue Victorious") in 1465. He also established his own administration and organized an army of tens of thousands of warriors.

The Ming government responded to the rebellion by dispatching troops under the leadership of the prominent commander Zhu Yong (朱勇), Count of Funing, and Minister of Works Bai Gui (白圭). (Note: Later, from 1467 to 1474, Bai Gui served as the minister of war.) Zhu and Bai assembled soldiers from various provinces, including the detachments of Li Zhen (李震) from Huguang. They set out in late 1465 and successfully suppressed the rebellion in 1466. The imperial forces captured the rebel leader Liu Tong in the summer of 1466.

The military defeat did not solve the immigration problem. When another 900,000 people migrated to the region due to famine in 1470, a new rebellion broke out led by Li Yuan (李原). Known as Bearded Li 李鬍子; Li Huzi), he declared himself the "King of Taiping" (太平王; Taiping wang; 'King of Great Peace'), and Monk Shi supported him. In December 1470, Xiang Zhong (項忠), the right censor-in-chief and one of the most prominent military commanders among officials, was sent to suppress the rebels. The Huguang commander Li Zhen assisted Xiang, gathering an army of 250,000 and successfully suppressing the rebellion. Li Yuan was captured in August 1471. Hundreds of local people were then executed and thousands were sent into exile, while 1.5 million people returned to their homelands. Xiang Zhong was subsequently transferred to the more important northern frontier.

A great comet appeared in the Beijing sky on 16 January 1472, fifteen days after the arrival of Xiang Zhong's report on the suppression of the rebellion. The comet was visible at night for a whole month, and it was seen as a sign of Heaven's displeasure with the government's actions. This caused officials to begin discussing possible erroneous decisions made by the government. When an official raised concerns that Xiang may have caused the deaths of innocent people during military operations against the rebels, his political opponents used the allegation to criticize him. They argued that Xiang would suffer Heaven's punishment for his harsh actions, but the Chenghua Emperor supported Xiang and dismissed the accusations against him. In June 1472, Bai Gui requested a review of Xiang's report, but the Emperor rejected the request and instead relied on Xiang's account when granting rewards to those who had helped suppress the rebellion. Xiang and Li Zhen were advanced by one rank. They were likely no more responsible for excessive loss of human life than other commanders during the rebellion, and their harsh treatment of refugees was not considered contrary to established policies. Xiang later became the minister of justice, and in 1474, he became minister of war.

== Rebellion of 1476 and aftermath ==
In the summer of 1476, as people began to return to Jingxiang, riots erupted once again. The government sent censor Yuan Jie (原傑) to investigate the social and economic conditions. This sparked a lively discussion in the capital about potential solutions to the problem. Considering Confucian principles, the government favored social and organizational measures as a way to bring peace to the country and its people. Yuan Jie was tasked with implementing these measures, and he made the decision to recognize immigrants' right to the land they cultivated. He organized land and population registration, successfully registering over 113,000 families and 438,000 individuals. Yuan also proposed the establishment of several new counties, leading to the creation of the new prefecture of Yunyang later that year. A defense military command was established in the seat of the new prefecture, with jurisdiction over neighboring districts in neighboring provinces. A grand coordinator oversaw the command. Within a year, Yuan was able to stabilize the situation in Jingxiang.

After serving in Yunyang for more than a year, Yuan grew exhausted by the demands of his duties and was transferred to another post. He died in 1477 while traveling to take up his new appointment at a roadside post station. The people of Jingxiang deeply mourned his death, according to contemporary accounts. The Jingxiang rebellion of 1465–1476 was the most significant Chinese rebellion of the 15th century and arguably the most significant social upheaval in the Ming state between the civil war of 1399–1402 and the Li Zicheng rebellion in the final years of the Ming dynasty.
