= Chen Baisha =

Chinese scholar, poet, and calligrapher (1428–1500)

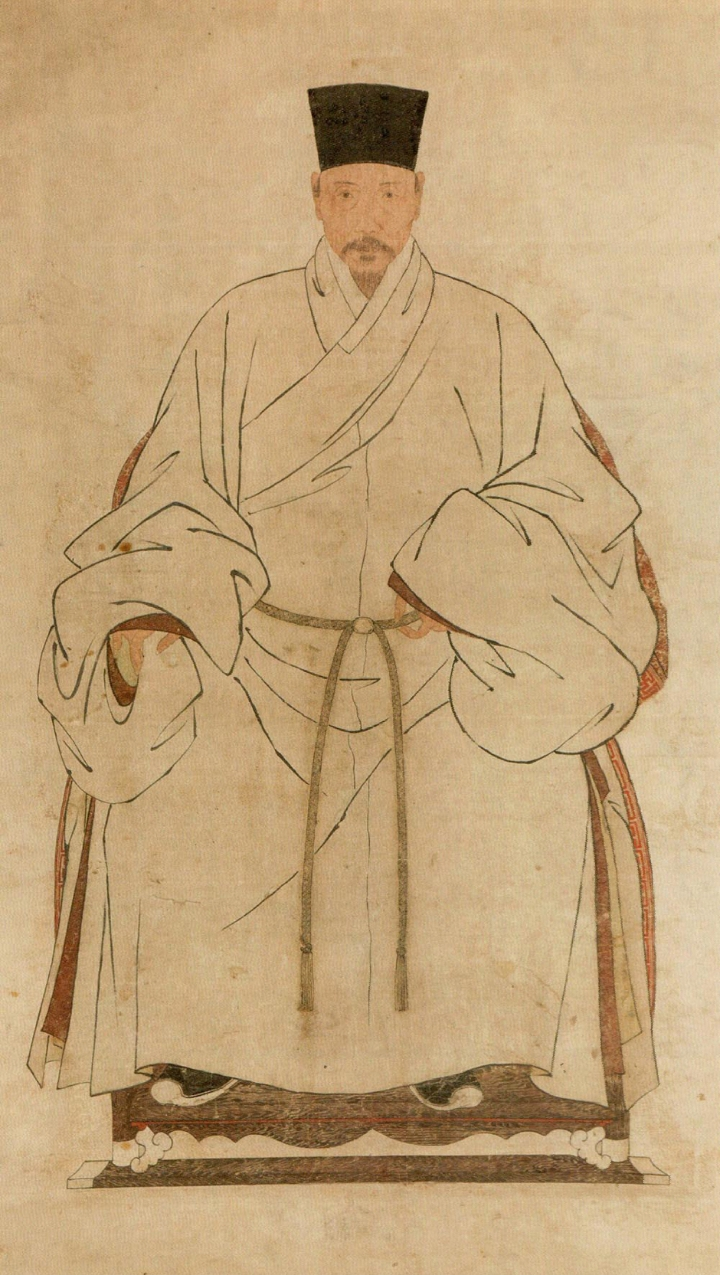
Chen Baisha's portrait (Guangdong Museum)

Chen Baisha (Cantonese Jyutping: Chan4 baak6 saa1; Chinese traditional: 陳白沙／陳獻章)(1428–1500) was a Cantonese Confucian scholar, poet, and calligrapher during the Ming dynasty. He was born in Xinhui and was considered to be the first scholar to come out from Xinhui and Guangdong. As early as 1464, when Chen was teaching in Baisha, Guangdong, his scholarship was already highly regarded. In 1466, at the age of thirty-nine, Chen travelled to Beijing and re-entered the National Academy. He was praised by Xing Rang and started a new trend of teaching.

When Chen Baisha died in 1500, he left behind a distinguished line of students, many of whom by then were holding high office. Among them, Liang Chu and Zhan Ruoshui were senior officials, and Huang Zuo, besides being a senior official.
