= Deposed Empress Wu =

Empress of China in 1464

Empress Wu 皇后吳氏

Empress consort of the Ming dynasty
- Tenure: 20 July 1464 – 1464
- Predecessor: Empress Xiaozhuangrui
- Successor: Empress Xiaozhenchun
- Born: 15th century Daxing County, Zhili (present-day Daxing District, Beijing)
- Died: 1509
- Burial: Jinshan, Beijing
- Spouse: Chenghua Emperor (m. 1464)
- Clan: Wu (吳)
- Father: Wu Jun (吳俊)

Deposed Empress Wu (吳廢后; 15th century – 1509) was a Chinese empress consort of the Ming dynasty, married to Zhu Jianshen, the Chenghua Emperor.

Empress Wu originated from the capital city of Beijing. In 1464, she was selected to be the first consort of the newly crowned emperor and chosen to become his empress. Soon after the wedding, she became involved in a conflict with the emperor's favourite concubine, Consort Wan, and ordered her to be whipped for impertinence. However, the emperor sided with his concubine and had Empress Wu demoted and stripped of her title and position. All this occurred one month after the wedding.

The former Empress Wu lived the rest of her life in obscurity in the garden of the Forbidden City. She still had influence in palace life. From 1470 until 1475, she cooperated with a group of loyal courtiers to hide concubine Consort Ji and her son, the future Hongzhi Emperor, in her room to protect them from Consort Wan.

Lady Wu's funeral was treated as that of a consort, and she was not awarded a posthumous name. Initially, Lady Wu was to be cremated following the funeral rites of an ordinary court lady.

== Titles ==
- During the reign of the Zhengtong Emperor (r. 1435–1449):
  - Lady Wu (吳氏)
- During the reign of the Chenghua Emperor (r. 1464–1487)
  - Empress (皇后; from 20 July 1464)

== Notes ==
Chinese royalty
| Preceded by Empress Xiaozhuangrui | Empress consort of China; 1464 | Succeeded by Empress Xiaozhenchun |
