= Hongzhi Emperor =

Emperor of China from 1487 to 1505

Hongzhi Emperor 弘治帝
- Palace portrait on a hanging scroll

Emperor of the Ming dynasty
- Reign: 9 September 1487 – 8 June 1505
- Enthronement: 22 September 1487
- Predecessor: Chenghua Emperor
- Successor: Zhengde Emperor
- Born: 30 July 1470
- Died: 8 June 1505 (aged 34); Palace of Heavenly Purity, Forbidden City, Beijing, Ming dynasty
- Burial: Tai Mausoleum, Ming tombs, Beijing, China
- Spouse: Empress Xiaochengjing (m. 1487)
- Issue Detail: Zhengde Emperor
Era dates
- Hongzhi: (Note: Chinese: 弘治; pinyin: Hóngzhì) 14 January 1488 – 23 January 1506
Posthumous name
- Emperor Jiantian Mingdao Chuncheng Zhongzheng Shengwen Shenwu Zhiren Dade Jing (Note: Simplified Chinese: 建天明道诚纯中正圣文神武至仁大德敬皇帝; traditional Chinese: 建天明道誠純中正聖文神武至仁大德敬皇帝 (conferred by the Zhengde Emperor in 1505))
Temple name
- Xiaozong (Note: Chinese: 孝宗; pinyin: Xiàozōng)
- House: Zhu
- Dynasty: Ming
- Father: Chenghua Emperor
- Mother: Empress Ji

Chinese name
- Chinese: 弘治帝
Transcriptions
Standard Mandarin
- Hanyu Pinyin: Hóngzhì Dì
- Wade–Giles: Hung^{2}-chih^{4} Ti^{4}
- IPA: [xʊ̌ŋ.ʈʂî tî]

The Hongzhi Emperor (30 July 1470 – 8 June 1505), personal name Zhu Youcheng, (Note: Chinese: 朱祐樘; pinyin: Zhū Yòuchēng) was the tenth emperor of the Ming dynasty of China, reigning from 1487 to 1505. He succeeded his father, the Chenghua Emperor.

The Hongzhi Emperor was born during a time in which his father's favorite concubine, Lady Wan, and her supporters were eliminating all potential heirs to the throne. The former empress protected the young prince from Lady Wan, and he did not reunite with his father until the age of five, when he was named heir to the throne. From a young age, he displayed exceptional intelligence and excelled in his studies, receiving a comprehensive Confucian education.

After the Hongzhi Emperor ascended the throne in 1487, he was known for his diligence and hard work, and Confucian ideology guided his administration. He closely oversaw all state affairs, implementing measures such as reducing taxes and government spending, and appointing capable officials to ministerial positions. This marked a rare period of harmonious cooperation between the monarch and his ministers during the Middle Ming period. In addition, the Emperor encouraged his ministers to openly express their opinions and even criticize his decisions, thus diminishing the power of the court eunuchs and eliminating the palace intrigues characteristic of previous reigns. This led to a more transparent government and revitalized the functioning of the authorities.

The Emperor oversaw updates to the Great Ming Code. The empire's economy was thriving, and the government sought to address the shortage of currency by resuming the production of coins that had been abolished in the 1430s. Despite facing a series of floods, the Yellow River was successfully regulated, and foreign trade with Southeast Asia flourished. The Hongzhi Emperor's foreign policy was peaceful, with the only major military campaign during his reign being the expedition to Hami in 1495. Ming troops also effectively suppressed several smaller rebellions, and the people prospered under his rule. In comparison to his predecessors, the Hongzhi Emperor can be considered one of the most successful rulers of the Ming dynasty, alongside the Hongwu and Yongle emperors.

== Early life and accession ==
Zhu Youcheng, the future Hongzhi Emperor, was born on 30 July 1470. He was the third son of the Chenghua Emperor, the eighth emperor of China's Ming dynasty, and the oldest to survive. His mother, a woman surnamed Ji, (Note: Some sources state her surname as Li.) was one of the Yao women captured during the suppression of the rebellion in the southern Chinese province of Guangxi and brought into the palace. He inherited his mother's southern appearance, with small stature and darker complexion; he had a bushy moustache, a sparse beard, and intelligent, bright eyes. However, he was not physically strong and often suffered from illness in his later years.

In 1469, Lady Ji formed a close relationship with the Emperor. After becoming pregnant, she had to live secretly in the chambers of the former Empress Wu due to the danger posed by the Emperor's favorite, Lady Wan. Lady Wan was known for ruthlessly eliminating any potential rivals for the Emperor's favor. It was not until Zhu Youcheng was five years old, in June 1475, that the Emperor learned of his son's existence. He enthusiastically acknowledged his son, but just a month later, Lady Ji died under suspicious circumstances. From then on, the boy's grandmother, Empress Dowager Zhou, oversaw his safety. Lady Ji's death must have been a great shock to Zhu Youcheng, as he deeply respected and remembered his mother even in adulthood.

On 5 December 1475, Zhu Youcheng was named heir to the throne. The elderly and well-educated eunuch Tan Ji (覃吉) began teaching him to read, starting with the Four Books, and in March 1478 the young prince's formal education in Confucian philosophy began. A book about exemplary successors was written in 1481 specifically because of his education. His teachers were able to instill Confucianism in him more effectively than other emperors, and he remained faithful to its teachings even in adulthood.

Concerned about her fate after the Chenghua Emperor's death and the accession of Zhu Youcheng, Lady Wan began plotting against the successor. Her eunuch ally, Liang Fang, proposed appointing a new heir, claiming that Zhu Youcheng was unintelligent and inferior, but another eunuch, Huai En (懷恩), defended the prince and argued for the right of inheritance of the eldest son and the stability of the dynasty. He was transferred to Fengyang, the "Central Capital". Shortly after, the court received news of an earthquake on Mount Tai, which was associated with the heir in the beliefs of the time. Officials who supported Zhu Youcheng saw this as a warning from Heaven, displeased with the discussion of succession. Fearing the disfavor of Heaven, the Chenghua Emperor did not make a decision to change the heir.

In February 1487, Zhu Youcheng married Lady Zhang from Xingji (興濟), a city located on the Grand Canal, less than 200 km south of Beijing (present-day Qing County, Cangzhou prefecture). He was deeply devoted to his wife and remained monogamous. On 1 September 1487, the Chenghua Emperor fell ill and three days later, he entrusted Zhu Youcheng with overseeing the actions of the grand secretaries. He died on 9 September. On 17 September 1487, Zhu Youcheng ascended to the throne and adopted the era name Hongzhi, which means "great governance".

The Hongzhi Emperor named his wife as empress and his mother as Empress Dowager Xiaomu. He then commanded a hunt for his mother's relatives in Guangxi Province. Two found cousins were named officers of the Imperial Guard, but they later got into a dispute with another alleged cousin, and in the end, all three were revealed as fraudsters. Despite this, the Emperor did construct a temple in Guangxi to pay tribute to his mother's unknown ancestors and a shrine in the Forbidden City to honor her memory.

== The imperial household ==
=== The Empress and her relatives ===
The Hongzhi Emperor was completely devoted to his wife, but the Empress focused heavily on favoring her relatives, especially her brothers. She was more concerned with living a luxurious life and trusting Taoist and Buddhist monks. The court became consumed with luxury and pleasure, something that had not been seen under previous rulers.

After their son was born in October 1491, the Emperor began to favor not only his wife, but also her father, brothers—Zhang Heling (張鶴齡) and Zhang Yanling (張延齡)—and all other relatives. In 1490, the Emperor had granted his father-in-law the title of Count of Shouning (壽寧伯). Then, in the spring of 1492, he named his young son heir to the throne, further solidifying the power and influence of the Zhang family. Shortly after, the Empress's father made an unprecedented request for a promotion to marquis, which was granted despite opposition from many officials. He died that same year and was posthumously elevated to Duke of Chang (昌國公). The title of Marquis was then inherited by his elder son, while the younger became Count and later Marquis of Jianchang (建昌侯). Both brothers received numerous gifts, including land, stewardship of imperial warehouses in Beijing, and licenses to trade in salt. Even the extended family of the Zhangs were granted titles, offices, lands, and opportunities for corruption that were unparalleled compared to the relatives of other Ming empresses.

Officials frequently complained about the behavior of the Empress's relatives, particularly her brothers. They were accused of corruption, embezzlement, and, in their home county south of Beijing, of seizing land from their neighbors. Despite these accusations, the Empress and her mother always defended the Zhang brothers. They were also supported by a group of eunuchs and officials who had advanced their careers through their connections with the Zhang family. The Emperor shielded the entire family from any punishment, even though he generally did not punish critics (according to Confucian ethics, officials should not be punished for honestly and directly pointing out mistakes).

The Emperor shared a belief in Taoism with his wife, which was frowned upon by officials, especially when he appointed Taoist monks to high ranks. Towards the end of the Hongzhi Emperor's reign, similar negative patterns from the Chenghua era began to emerge, although not to the same extent. These included the establishment of imperial estates, direct appointments that bypassed the Ministry of Personnel, patronage in the salt trade, and bribery, which damaged the image of a conscientious and hard-working, yet inefficient, emperor.

=== Eunuchs ===
After ascending to the throne, the Hongzhi Emperor demoted and exiled corrupt and unpopular eunuchs, such as Liang Fang. He then appointed capable and trustworthy candidates to lead the Directorate of Ceremonial, which also informally served as the head of the eunuchs in the imperial palace. One such candidate was Huai En, who had previously retired. Despite these efforts, officials continued to criticize the eunuchs and disapprove of the Emperor and his family's favor towards Buddhists and Taoists. (Note: To support Buddhism and Taoism despite the disapproval of the administration, there were both personal (influence of the emperors' surroundings) and political reasons: both religions had wide popular support, Buddhist lamas were highly regarded by the Beijing Mongols and Tibetans, and they were important for maintaining good relations with Tibet. Finally, the sale of religious titles was a significant source of income for the imperial treasury.) The Emperor's decision to limit the powers of the eunuch secret police units, known as the Western and Eastern Depots, was met with gratitude by the bureaucracy and population of the capital. The Emperor also made sure to appoint honorable men to lead these units, as well as the Imperial Guard.

During the reign of the Hongzhi Emperor, only two politically significant cases related to eunuchs arose. In 1489, Jiang Cong, who had been one of the three dignitaries governing Nanjing for many years, became embroiled in a dispute with the censors over the legality of certain incomes. These incomes were apparently used to pay for the Emperor's expenses. Jiang blamed the censors for their inability to detect other violations of the law, while the censors accused him of wrongdoing. The Emperor ultimately ruled in Jiang's favor in 1490, but the attacks from officials continued until he was deposed in 1494. His downfall was due to his construction projects disrupting Nanjing's geomantic configuration. The second case involved Li Guang, who was commissioned by the Emperor to raise funds through the sale of salt licenses and payments for the promotion and appointment of officials. Officials repeatedly accused him of making mistakes, but their attempts to discredit him were unsuccessful. On 28 October 1498, Li was driven to commit suicide after it was alleged that a pavilion he had built in the imperial gardens was placed in an unsuitable location according to feng shui principles. This was believed to have caused a series of misfortunes, including the death of the Emperor's daughter on 1 October and a fire in one of the palaces of the Forbidden City on 26 October.

== Government and administration ==
=== Reduction of bureaucracy and composition of the government ===
At the start of his reign, the Emperor made efforts to reduce unnecessary spending and eliminate corrupt eunuch-run agencies. He placed great importance on the competence and integrity of his bureaucracy, and was even stricter than previous Ming emperors (with the exception of the founder of the dynasty, the Hongwu Emperor) in removing incompetent and dishonest officials. Shortly after taking the throne, he conducted a thorough purge of the court, removing many flatterers who had obtained their positions through bribery rather than merit. This included dismissing two thousand extra officials and nearly a thousand Taoists, Buddhists, and lamas, whom he sent back to their homes. He also imprisoned or executed the most corrupt Buddhist and Taoist monks. Additionally, he removed the relatives of Lady Wan from their positions and the disgraced Senior Grand Secretary Wan An (萬安), who was the head of the government.

The reduction of bureaucracy at the beginning of the Emperor's reign is evidenced by an episode recorded by the Korean Choe Bu. In the spring of 1488, Choe Bu led a group of Korean sailors who shipwrecked on the coast of Fujian and were returning home at the expense of the Ming government. While traveling on the Grand Canal to the north, he observed a constant stream of official boats going in the opposite direction. He was told that the new emperor was reducing the number of officials in the capital and, as a gesture of favor, allowing those who were dismissed to travel home comfortably at state expense.

The Emperor called upon able and straightforward men who had previously retired. Among them were the eunuch Huai En and the official Wang Shu (王恕), the latter of whom was appointed minister of personnel. He sought their advice in selecting the other ministers. The leading ministers in Hongzhi's government were Ma Wensheng, who successively headed the Censorate, the Ministry of War, and the Ministry of Personnel, and Liu Daxia (劉大夏), who served as minister of war during the last five years of the Hongzhi Emperor's reign. The Emperor frequently consulted with Liu Daxia, which was unusual in the Ming administrative system.

The Emperor also sought advice from the grand secretaries as a group. Of the three grand secretaries from the previous era, two had a bad reputation and were dismissed—Wan An and Liu Jue (劉珝). This left only Liu Ji (劉吉), who was still criticized by some censors. However, the newly appointed grand secretaries, Liu Jian (劉健) and Xu Pu (徐溥), as well as those selected a few years later, Qiu Jun (丘濬), Li Dongyang, and Xie Qian (謝遷), were all honorable men. This led to exceptional harmony at court.

=== Governing style ===
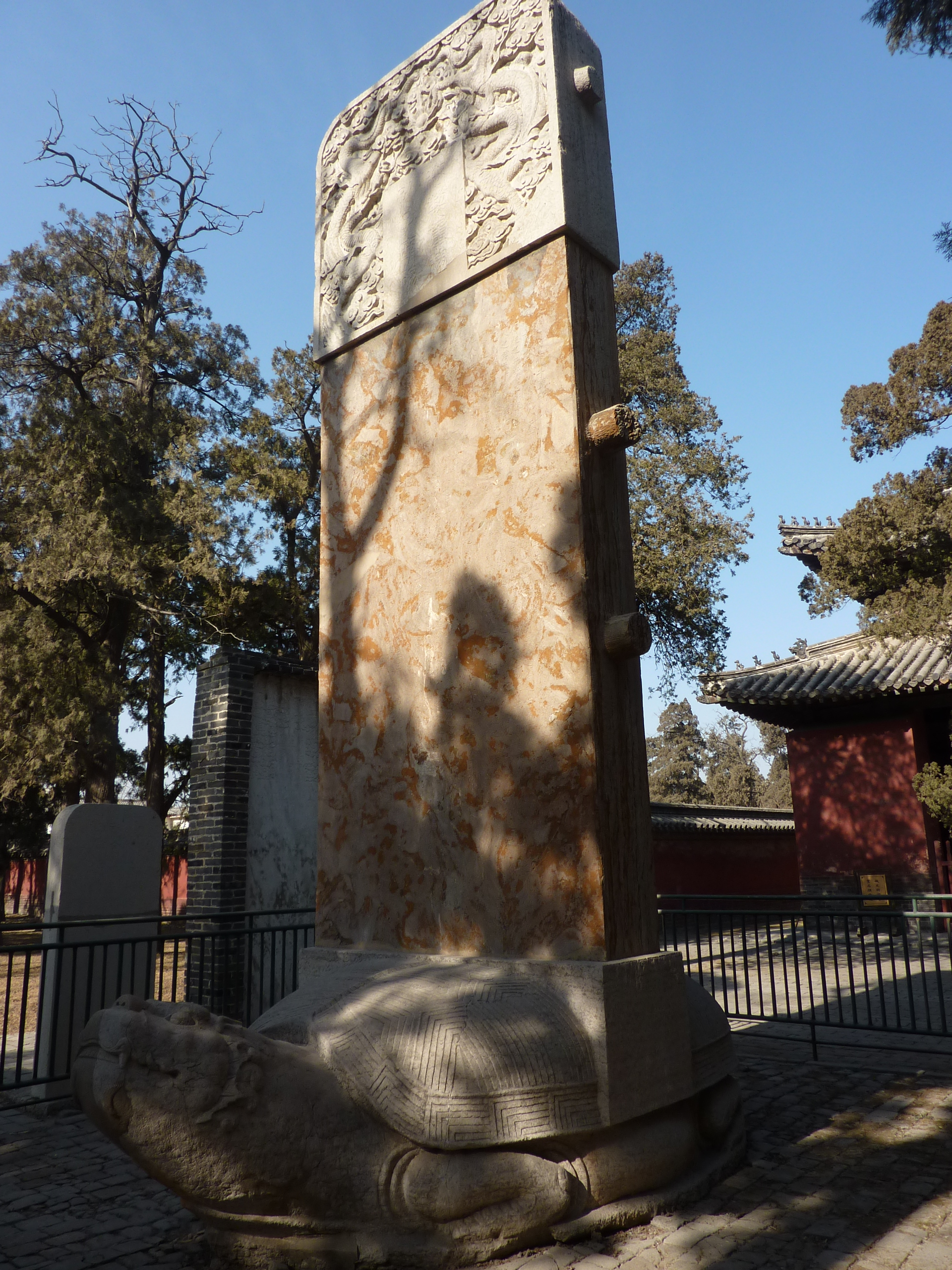
A stele with the Hongzhi Emperor's inscription regarding the repair of the Temple of Confucius, Qufu. 1504 (17th year of the Hongzhi era)

The Hongzhi Emperor wholeheartedly embraced the teachings of Confucianism, surpassing even the Ming and other Chinese emperors in his sincerity. He diligently fulfilled both the ritual and political duties of a monarch, striving to live and rule according to Confucian ideals. He listened to his ministers and prioritized the welfare of his people. Despite his conscientious efforts to govern and address the empire's problems, he lacked grand plans or a clear vision.

Unlike the Chenghua Emperor, who had not met with his ministers since 1469, the Hongzhi Emperor resumed regular audiences with the ministers in 1497. His government was dominated by civil officials who held more influence than the eunuchs and led military campaigns. He refrained from using harsh punishments against officials. Some Confucian historians have even compared his reign, particularly the early years, to the golden age of the sage rulers of antiquity. He actively worked to heal and streamline the state administration, presiding over daily morning audiences as one of his primary duties as emperor. However, his frail health often made it difficult for him to fulfill his duties.

The Emperor consistently followed the advice of the grand secretaries, intervening personally in only a few affairs and stubbornly maintaining his independence in them. Over time, however, under the influence of the Empress and her family, he began to make more decisions on his own. These decisions included supporting certain Buddhists and Taoists, as well as promoting and giving gifts to a select few individuals. This did not diminish the political power of the Grand Secretariat or the government's high morale.

During the Hongzhi era, two important works were compiled to supplement the Ming Code: Da-Ming huidian (大明會典) and Wenxing tiaoli (問刑條例; 'Clauses and precedent rules for judicial interrogation'). These works, which contained 297 articles, were completed in March 1500, but the editors of the first work were criticized for not addressing the role of eunuchs and regulating their rights, which allowed for their illegal activities to continue. These compilations were the result of years of effort by officials who were dissatisfied with the state of the legal system, with the goal of making slight improvements.

The Hongzhi Emperor's devotion to Confucianism was unprecedented and unusual; even as emperor, he took his studies seriously and organized debates on political issues based on classical precedents. He also did not neglect the artistic aspect of education, as he was a skilled painter and calligrapher. Despite his mistakes, officials who were faithful to Confucian ideology overlooked and excused them due to his approach.

== Society ==
=== Economy and culture ===
During the Hongzhi era, China experienced numerous natural disasters, particularly towards the end of the 1490s. In the 1480s, a severe drought struck the empire, followed by floods in northern China in the early 1490s, with one particularly devastating flood in 1492. The Emperor granted tax forgiveness on 3.5 million liters of wheat. The floods on the Yellow River, which had been ongoing since the late 1480s, caused the dam in Shandong to collapse, resulting in widespread destruction. In 1493, an expert named Liu Daxia was finally given the task of finding a solution to the problem. He enlisted the help of local experts and successfully regulated the river from Kaifeng, redirecting the main flow southeast to Suzhou in northern Jiangsu and then through the river bed of the Huai River, effectively preventing future floods in Shandong. (Note: Until the mid-19th century, the Yellow River flowed southward.) The project involved 120,000 men and took two years to complete. Liu's success earned him a place in history and the favor of the Emperor, leading to his promotion to the position of minister of war (1501–1506). He became a trusted confidant of the Emperor during the final years of the Hongzhi Emperor's reign.

Despite the challenges of drought, floods, and crop failures, (Note: According to William Atwell, the increase in volcanic activity on the Northern Hemisphere may be the cause.) the economy thrived under the Hongzhi Emperor's rule. However, there was a growing concentration of land in the hands of the powerful, particularly in both metropolitan areas, which began in the mid-15th century. While the Emperor reduced tributary relations with Southeast Asia, private foreign trade with the region flourished due to the lack of government enforcement.

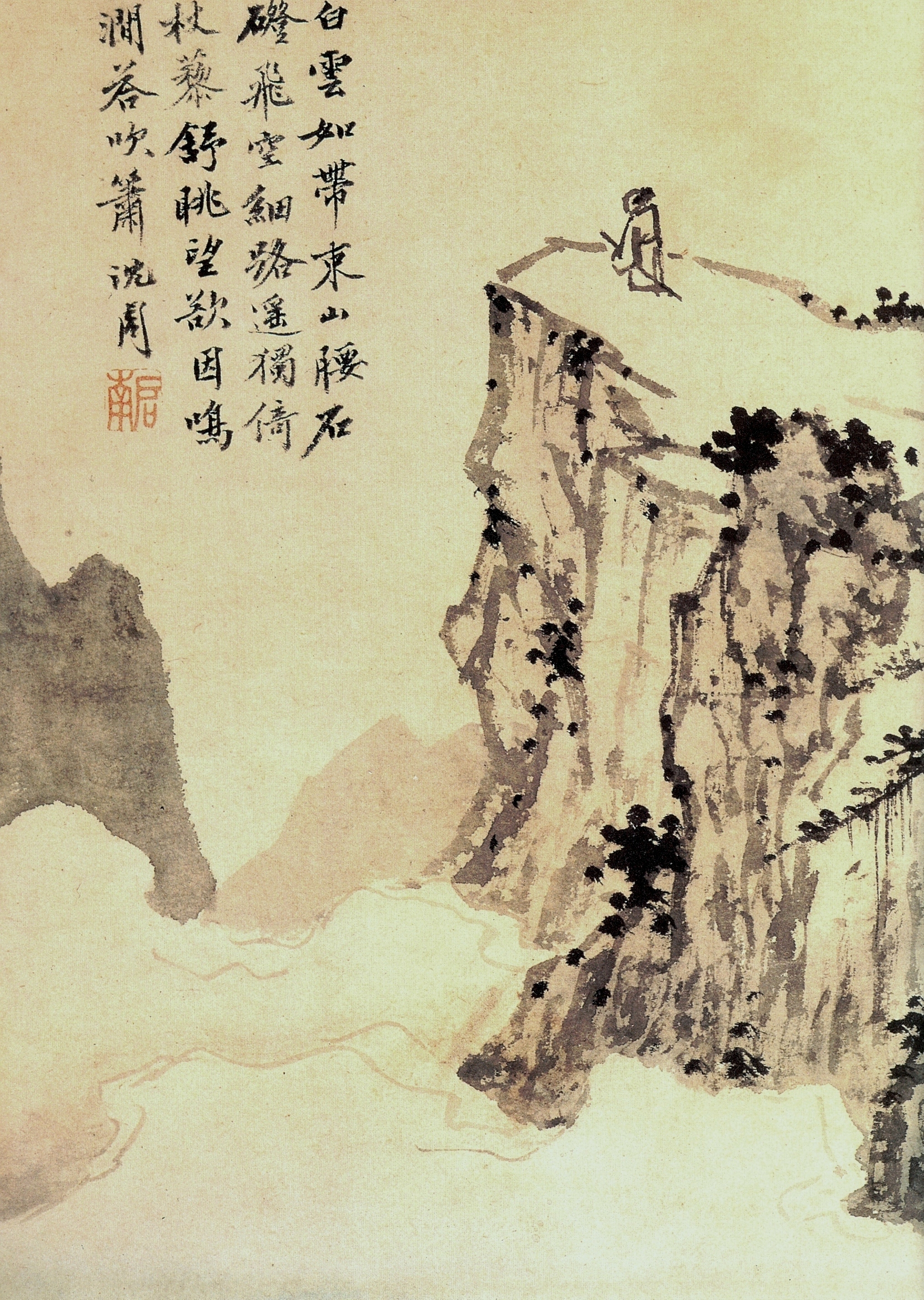
Detail of the painting Poet on a Mountaintop by Shen Zhou (1427–1509), ink on paper. The Nelson-Atkins Museum of Art, Kansas City, Missouri

In Suzhou, wealthy families began to rival the nobility in their patronage of the arts, leading to the flourishing of the Wu School of painting, which included renowned artists such as Shen Zhou, Wen Zhengming, Tang Yin, and Qiu Ying. Grand Secretary Li Dongyang held great influence in matters of painting, calligraphy, and poetry, and the Emperor himself was a patron of Shen Du (沈度) and other court painters, such as Lü Ji.

=== Tea trade ===
Due to conflicts with the Turpan over Hami, the army was in need of horses. As a solution, the Emperor agreed to revive the state's practice of exchanging tea for horses, in order to combat the illegal private sale of tea to Tibetan and Mongolian tribes in the northwest. The plan involved licensed traders transporting tea from Sichuan to Gansu border towns, with 40% of the tea (400,000 jin, approximately 240 tons) being handed over to the authorities and the rest being sold by the traders themselves. The government's goal was to obtain 4,000 horses through this exchange, but the merchants would often take the inferior quality tea and keep the higher quality tea for themselves, resulting in the officials receiving subpar horses from the Tibetans in exchange.

In 1494, after a famine in Shaanxi, the Emperor offered 2 million jin (around 1,200 tons) of tea from state reserves to merchants in exchange for rice to be sent to the affected regions. In the following years, the practice of exchanging tea for horses was discontinued and instead, merchants were offered 4 million jin of tea. In 1501, the Emperor ordered 4–5 million jin of tea to be sold for silver, which was then used by the authorities to purchase grain for Shaanxi. However, this decision hindered the exchange of tea for horses, leading the Emperor to ban the exchange of tea for grain in 1502. Despite these efforts, the government struggled to obtain high-quality tea to exchange for high-quality horses, and merchants continued to independently export tea across the border, bypassing the state's control.

=== Currency ===
Since the closure of the mints in the 1430s, there has been a worsening shortage of coins and coppers over time. In the early 16th century, privately produced coins replaced the state-issued coins from the early Ming and the remaining Tang and Song dynasties.

By the end of the 15th century, copper coins were mainly in circulation in the north, while silver had replaced them in the south. A revenue record of 1481 mentions that coins were only used in Beizhili, Nanzhili, Henan and Shandong, which are all located along the Grand Canal. Similarly, a record of 1503 states that coins were used in the same areas, but not in Fujian, Guangdong (although they were still in use at the time of the record; private and highly valued Song coins were used), Yunnan, Guizhou, and other inland regions. In Jiangxi and Huguang, rice, grain, silver, and cloth were used as currency, while in the more underdeveloped northwest (in Shaanxi and Shanxi), skin was used and in the southwest (Yunnan), cowrie shells were used.

Merchants also exported Ming private coins abroad. However, paradoxically, while these coins were accepted as currency and recognized officially abroad, the Ming government stubbornly refused to acknowledge them in China. In the early 16th century, the Ming government discovered that proper state coins had disappeared from the market and resumed minting in 1503. The main purpose of this measure was to push the private coins out of Jiangnan, where they were particularly widespread. The government attempted to support its own coinage by issuing a decree that halved the value of coins from previous dynasties and reiterating the ban on private coinage. Despite these efforts and the significant amount of production, state coins failed to gain dominance in the market. Furthermore, the technical process of producing copper coins was problematic as their casting was expensive and officials did not have access to qualified experts, leading them to even use detained counterfeiters.

== Military and foreign policy ==
=== Military reforms ===
The Hongzhi Emperor was likely the first Ming emperor who did not seek military glory or strive to match the accomplishments of his predecessors. He saw himself as a Confucian ruler who should gain superiority over neighboring nations through the power of virtue rather than weapons, and thus he generally avoided aggressive actions. The only notable military campaigns during his reign were the expedition to Hami in 1495 and the suppression of several minor rebellions. He did consider a potential expedition to the northern frontier, but was ultimately dissuaded by his ministers and grand secretaries.

In contrast to the late Chenghua era, where the Beijing garrison, including the twelve training divisions, was controlled by eunuchs, the Hongzhi Emperor handed command over to civil officials in 1487 and overall command to Ma Wensheng, an official with considerable experience in leading troops on the northern frontier.

Instead of relying solely on hereditary soldiers from the Weisuo system, the army increasingly turned to hiring mercenaries for pay. These mercenaries were known as "local soldiers" (土兵; Tubing) on the border and "people's stalwarts" (民壯; Minzhuang) inland. In 1494, the Emperor officially adjusted the rules for recruiting these soldiers, which had previously been done informally since 1449. In 1502, 300,000 Minzhuang soldiers were incorporated into the Weisuo units to strengthen them. In 1464, special examinations were introduced for selecting officers, but it was not until the 1470s that this became more widespread. However, the Emperor was dissatisfied with the results of these examinations as they did not reveal officers with exceptional talent. In 1496, he called on local officials to find such men, but this effort proved unsuccessful.

=== Unrest in the southwest and south ===
During the reign of the Hongzhi Emperor, unrest continued to plague the southwest region of the Ming dynasty. One of the most significant disturbances during the late 15th century was the rebellion led by a woman named Mi-lu from the Lolo tribe, which took place on the border of Guizhou and Yunnan from 1499 to 1502. The suppression of this rebellion required the mobilization of troops from four provinces and 80,000 members of local tribes.

The Li rebellion in Hainan from 1500 to 1503 was a significant event. It was sparked by the overreach of Chinese officials and led by tribal leaders, resulting in rebels from the inland mountains attacking Chinese residents in the coastal plains. As the government debated the best course of action, Feng Yu, a secretary in the Ministry of Revenue who was a Han Chinese native of Hainan, suggested placing local administration under the control of hereditary Li chiefs instead of Chinese authorities, which had been the norm until the Chenghua era. Although the proposal was approved, the rebellion was ultimately quelled through military force, resulting in heavy losses for both Chinese and Mongol troops.

In discussions about the most effective approach to dealing with non-Chinese tribes, officials from the affected regions often advocated for a policy of indirect rule by granting Chinese titles and ranks to native chiefs (known as Tusi), rather than implementing a purely Chinese bureaucratic administration.

=== Central Asia ===
The Hongzhi Emperor's ministers inherited enmity from the Chenghua era against the Sultan of Turpan, who had captured Hami, an important city on the Silk Road west of China, much to their displeasure. In 1489, Ming diplomacy began to organize anti-Turpan actions, and in 1495, the Ming intervened militarily. A Sino-Mongol army conquered Hami and installed a Uighur prince on the throne, but the Turpans were able to recapture the city before the end of the same year. The Ming government completely halted trade along the Silk Road, forcing the Turpans to yield. In 1499, the Uighur prince was once again installed in Hami. This success was likely due to the influence of the experienced military minister Ma Wensheng, who had served in the northwest in his youth and had a better understanding of the situations beyond the Great Wall than other Beijing statesmen. However, the Uighur prince's incompetence caused tension among his subjects, leading to continued instability. The Ming government continued to interfere in Hami affairs in the first decade of the 16th century, but their influence gradually weakened.

== Death and legacy ==
On 1 June 1505, the Hongzhi Emperor fell ill and died a few days later, on 8 June. He was given the temple name Xiaozong, meaning "Filial Ancestor", in recognition of his dedication to Confucian virtues, and the posthumous name Emperor Jing (敬帝; 'Respectful Emperor'). He was buried in the Tai Mausoleum in the Ming tombs near Beijing.

The Emperor's thirteen-year-old son succeeded him as the Zhengde Emperor on 19 June 1505. Despite his father's love, and his early appointment as successor in 1492, the Zhengde Emperor held opposing views on many issues. In comparison to his son's rejection of Confucian values, the Hongzhi Emperor was remembered by Chinese intellectuals as an ideal ruler.

The History of Ming has recognized the Hongzhi Emperor as one of the commendable rulers of the sixteen Ming emperors, of whom only the Hongxi, Xuande, and Hongzhi emperors were deemed worthy of recognition besides the Hongwu and Yongle emperors. During his reign, border defenses were strengthened, tax administration was improved, and a spirit of openness and cooperation was fostered within the government.

The Hongzhi Emperor's rule is traditionally viewed as a time of harmonious relations between the Emperor and the government. Confucian scholars praised him as a model ruler and downplayed his flaws, particularly his favoritism towards the Empress and her unworthy relatives. The Emperor actively advised officials, leading to improved relations with them. However, no changes were made to the structure of the highest offices, allowing for a swift rise in the abuse of eunuch power under the subsequent Zhengde and Jiajing emperors.

== Family ==
In contrast to almost all of his predecessors, who had many consorts and fathered many children, the Hongzhi Emperor had only one consort, Empress Zhang. The Empress gave birth to two sons, but the second one died at a young age. The Emperor showed a lot of love to his first son, Zhu Houzhao, which he himself lacked in his childhood, but Zhu Houzhao quietly disagreed with his father's teachings, though he never expressed it openly. According to the History of Ming, on his deathbed, the Hongzhi Emperor summoned his officials and entrusted them with the care of his son, who was only thirteen at the time. Zhu Houzhao was described as intelligent, but too inclined towards entertainment and pleasure.

According to the History of Ming, the Hongzhi Emperor had three daughters: Princess Taikang, Princess Yongfu, and Princess Yongchun, but other sources such as Wanli yehuo bian and the Veritable Records of Shizong record that Princess Yongfu and Princess Yongchun were actually the daughters of his younger brother, Zhu Youyuan.

- Zhu Houzhao (朱厚㷖), the Zhengde Emperor (正德帝; 1491–1521), first son
- Princess Taikang (太康公主; d. 1498), personal name Xiurong (秀榮), first daughter
- Zhu Houwei (朱厚煒), Prince Dao of Wei (蔚悼王), second son

== See also ==
- Chinese emperors family tree (late)

== Notes ==
Hongzhi Emperor House of Zhu Born: 30 July 1470 Died: 8 June 1505
Regnal titles
Preceded by Chenghua Emperor	Emperor of the Ming dynasty 9 September 1487 – 8 June 1505	Succeeded by Zhengde Emperor
