= Empress Xiaosu =

Chinese empress dowager (1430–1504)

Empress Xiaosu 孝肅皇后
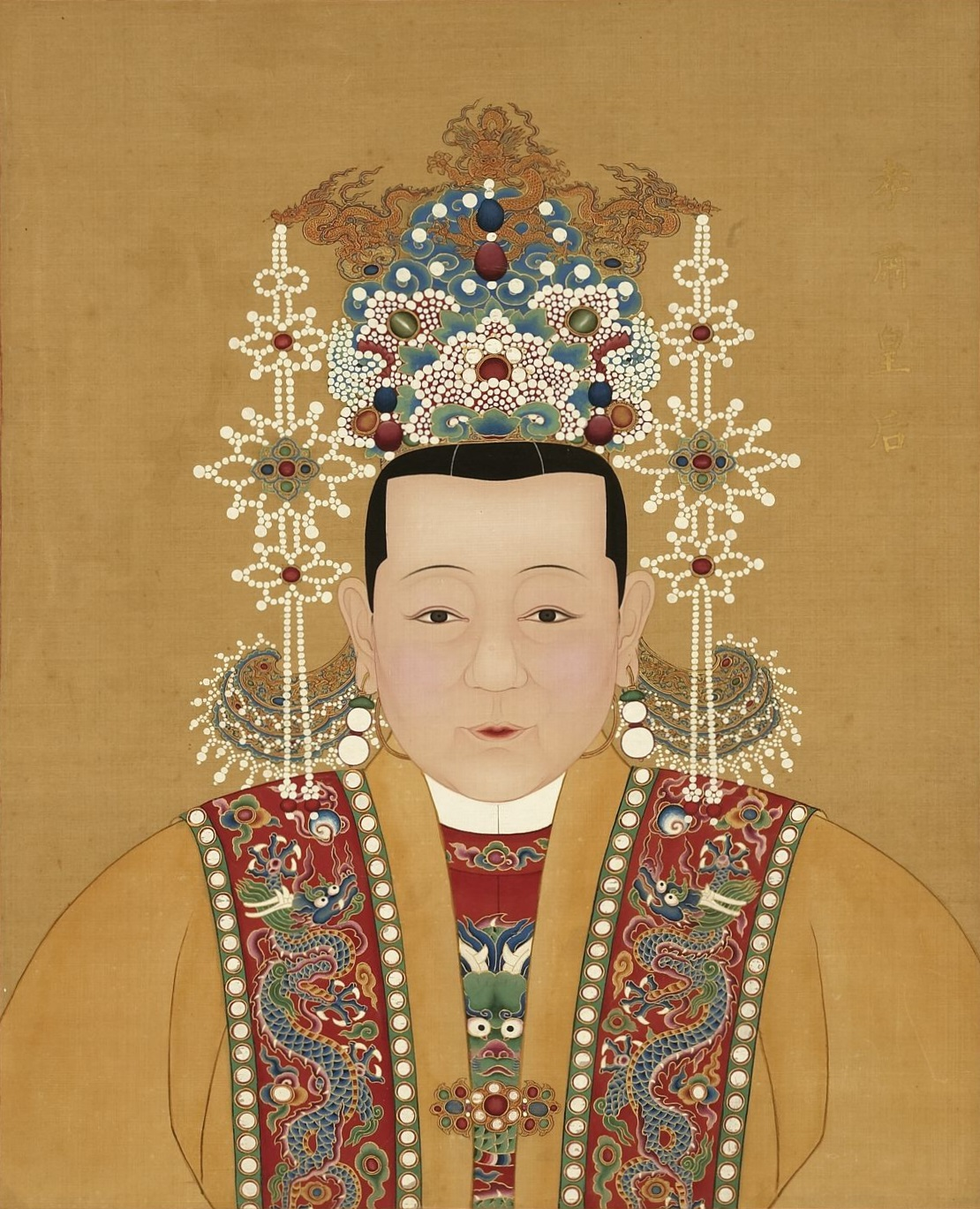

Grand empress dowager of the Ming dynasty
- Tenure: 9 September 1487 – 17 March 1504
- Predecessor: Grand Empress Dowager Zhang
- Successor: Grand Empress Dowager Cisheng

Empress dowager of the Ming dynasty
- Tenure: 23 February 1464 – 9 September 1487
- Predecessor: Empress Dowager Xiaoyi
- Successor: Empress Dowager Wang
- Born: 1430; Changping County
- Died: 17 March 1504 (aged 73–74)
- Burial: 1504; Yuling
- Spouse: Emperor Yingzong (m. 1446; died 1464)
- Issue: Chenghua Emperor; Zhu Jianze, Prince Jian of Chong; Princess Chongqing
Posthumous name
- Empress Xiaosu Zhēnshùn Kāngyì Guāngliè Fǔtiān Chéngshèng (孝肅貞順康懿光烈輔天承聖皇后)
- Clan: Zhou (周)
- Father: Zhou Neng, Duke of Ning (寧國公 周能)
- Mother: Lady Zhen (甄氏)

Empress Xiaosu (1430 – 17 March 1504), of the Zhou clan, was the concubine of Emperor Yingzong of Ming and the mother of the Chenghua Emperor.

== Biography ==
Zhou was the daughter of Zhou Neng (周能), a poor farmer in Changping County. When Emperor Yingzong went hunting, he accidentally entered her home by mistake. The whole family was shocked and scared, but Zhou was the only one who acted comfortably. Because of this, she caught the eye of the emperor and entered the palace with the high rank of consort. In 1446, she gave birth to Zhu Qizhen's eldest daughter the Princess Chongqing and his eldest son, Zhu Jianshen (the future Chenghua Emperor). When Emperor Yingzong was captured by the Mongols in 1449, the Empress Dowager Sun ordered that Consort Zhou's eldest son would be named Crown Prince. But when Emperor Yingzong's younger brother Zhu Qiyu became emperor, he deposed Crown Prince Zhu Jianshen. In 1455, she gave birth to Zhu Qizhen's sixth son, Zhu Jianze.

In 1457 when Zhu Qizhen was restored to the throne, she was given the rank of Noble consort.

When her son the Chenghua Emperor ascended the throne, both she and Empress Qian received the rank of empress dowager. However, there was conflict on who to give the empress dowager's emblem since there were two empress dowagers. The eunuch Xia Shi, in an effort to please Noble Consort Zhou, sent an order to honor Zhou with the emblem of the empress dowager. Both the scholars Li Xian and Peng Shi fought hard on which empress dowager would be given an emblem while both Empress Qian and Zhou treated each other with respect. On April 23 of Chenghua, Zhou was given the emblem and title of 'Empress Dowager Shengcirenshou' (聖慈仁壽皇太后).

It was said that during the Chenghua Emperor's reign, Zhou was known to be extremely kind and treated everyone around her with respect. The Chenghua Emperor held his mother in high regard, and never dared to disobey her orders.

In the Ming dynasty (before Yingzong) only the empress could be buried with the emperor. The name of the emperor and the empress were fixed before and could not be changed in any circumstance. When Empress Qian died, Zhou wanted to prevent Empress Qian from being buried together with Emperor Yingzong in Yuling. Zhou secretly changed the design of Emperor Yingzong's mausoleum so that she can be buried with him in the future. Although Empress Qian and Emperor Yingzong had the same tomb, they were entered through different tunnels.

When the Hongzhi Emperor came to the throne, he honored Empress Dowager Zhou as Grand empress dowager and named Empress Wang as empress dowager. The Hongzhi Emperor was said to have been respectful and filial to Zhou.

During winter in the eleventh year of Hongzhi, Qingning Palace was destroyed and Zhou moved to Renshou Palace.

== Titles ==
- During the reign of the Xuande Emperor (r. 1425–1435):
  - Lady Zhou (周氏; from 1430)
- During the reign of the Zhengtong Emperor (r. 1435 – 1449):
  - Palace Lady (from 1437)
  - Consort (妃; from unknown date)
- During the reign of the Jingtai Emperor (r. 1449 – 1457):
  - Consort Emerita (太上妃; from 1449)
- During the reign of the Tianshun Emperor (r. 1457–1464):
  - Noble Consort (貴妃; from February 1457)
- During the reign of the Chenghua Emperor (r. 1464–1487)
  - Empress Dowager (皇太后; from 28 February 1464 )
  - Empress Dowager Shengcirenshou (聖慈仁壽皇太后; from 1487)
- During the reign of the Hongzhi Emperor (r. 1487–1505)
  - Grand Empress Dowager (太皇太后; from 1487)
  - Grand Empress Dowager Xiàosù Zhēnshùn Kāngyì Guāngliè Fǔtiān Chéngshèng (孝肅貞順康懿光烈輔天承聖皇后; from 1504)
- During the reign of the Jiajing Emperor (r. 1521–1567)
  - Empress Xiaosu Zhēnshùn Kāngyì Guāngliè Fǔtiān Chéngshèng (孝肅貞順康懿光烈輔天承聖皇后; from 1536)

== Issue ==
- As a consort:
  - Princess Chongqing (重慶公主; 1446–1499), Emperor Yingzong's first daughter
  - Zhu Jianshen, the Chenghua Emperor (憲宗 朱見深; 9 December 1447 – 9 September 1487), Emperor Yingzong's first son
  - Zhu Jianze, Prince Jian of Chong (崇簡王 朱見澤; 2 May 1455 – 27 August 1505), Emperor Yingzong's sixth son

== Death ==
In Ming, only the emperor and empress were allowed to be worshipped in ancestral temples. So when Empress Zhou died in 1504, courtiers were fighting if Empress Zhou should be worshipped in the Ancestral temples. Scholars Liu Juan, Xie Qian and Li Dongyang objected mentioning that Zhou was never an empress in her lifetime and therefore does not deserve to be worshipped in the ancestral temples and to be buried with the emperor. However, Zhou was still given a posthumous title for an empress and was buried together with Emperor Yingzong, as she wished. After Zhou had been buried, it was discovered that the tunnel to the tomb of Empress Qian was separated from Emperor Yingzong. Empress Qian was never reburied together with Emperor Yingzong. After Zhou's death, the birth mothers of future Ming emperors (even if they never held the rank of empress) were buried together with their husbands.

The Hongzhi Emperor gave Zhou the posthumous title of: Grand Empress Dowager Xiàosùzhēnshùnkāngyìguānglièfǔtiānchéngshèngtàihuángtàihòu (孝肅貞順康懿光烈輔天承聖太皇太后)

During the reign of the Jiajing Emperor, he granted Zhou a different posthumous title. Her final posthumous title was: Empress Xiàosùzhēnshùnkāngyìguānglièfǔtiānchéngshènghuánghòu (孝肅貞順康懿光烈輔天承聖皇后)

== In popular culture ==
- He Saifei as Empress Dowager Zhou in 2011 drama The Emperor's Harem.
- Sheng Langxi as Noble Consort Zhou in the 2016 drama The Imperial Doctress.
- Qu Ni Tsering as Zhou Guifei in the 2019 drama Ming Dynasty.
- Fang Xiaoli as Empress Dowager Zhou in the 2020 drama The Sleuth of the Ming Dynasty.
