= Wan Zhen'er =

Chinese imperial consort (1428–1487)

Imperial Noble Consort Gongsu 恭肅皇貴妃
- Born: 1428; Zhucheng County, Shandong (present-day Zhucheng, Shandong, China)
- Died: 1487 (aged 58–59)
- Spouse: Chenghua Emperor
- Issue: The Chenghua Emperor's first son
Posthumous name
- Imperial Noble Consort Gongsu Duanshun Rongjing (恭肅端順榮靖皇貴妃)
- Father: Wan Gui (萬貴)
- Mother: Lady Wang (王氏)

Imperial Noble Consort Wan (traditional Chinese: 萬皇貴妃; simplified Chinese: 万皇贵妃) (1428 – 1487), born Wan Zhen'er (simplified Chinese: 万贞儿; traditional Chinese: 萬貞兒; pinyin: Wàn Zhēn'ér), was an imperial consort during the Ming dynasty. She is sometimes known as Consort Wan or Lady Wan and was the favorite consort of the Chenghua Emperor. She was approximately 15 to 17 years older than the emperor.

== Biography ==
Wan Zhen'er's father, Wan Gui, was a county official. During the Xuande period, he was sent to Bazhou in Shuntian Prefecture for breaking the law. Therefore, when Wan Zhen'er was four years old, she was selected to serve as the maid of one of the Xuande Emperor's grandsons of the Ming dynasty. In 1449, Emperor Yingzong of Ming was captured after his army lost the Battle of Tumu Fortress against the Mongols. His capture by the enemy force shook the empire to its core, and the ensuing crisis almost caused the dynasty to collapse had it not been for the capable governing of a prominent minister named Yu Qian.

In the emperor's absence, Empress Dowager Sun and court officials supported Yingzong's younger brother Zhu Qiyu's ascension to the throne as the Jingtai Emperor. At the time, Yingzong's two-year-old son Zhu Jianshen was still crown prince. In order to prevent enemies from getting close to Zhu Jianshen, Empress Dowager Sun appointed Wan Zhen'er to be the prince's personal nanny. In 1452, the Jingtai Emperor revoked his nephew's title of crown prince and installed his own son, Zhu Jianji, as heir. Zhu Jianshen was forced into confinement, during which time he became close to Wan Zhen'er, who was one of his only remaining companions.

In 1457, Yingzong regained the throne as the Tianshun Emperor, and Zhu Jianshen was reinstated as crown prince. When the emperor learned about Zhu Jianshen's relationship with Wan Zhen'er, he believed that the older palace maid had seduced the young prince and had her beaten with boards.

After Zhu Jianshen ascended to the throne as the Chenghua Emperor in 1464, he made Wan his consort and she quickly became his favorite after giving birth to a boy in 1466. As the mother of his son, the emperor regularly gave Consort Wan many presents and awarded her the new title of Imperial Noble Consort. These signs of affection caused a lot of jealousy from other consorts, who began spreading rumors about Consort Wan's evil doings. After Wan's son died aged ten months old, she jealously employed eunuchs to oversee the emperor's harem and report back to her if any concubines became pregnant. For several decades, Lady Wan would use tactics including forced abortions and even murders of members of the harem to eliminate her rivals, resulting in the Chenghua Emperor lamenting that by the age of thirty-one that he still lacked a male heir.

It was only then revealed to the emperor that a male heir, Zhu Youcheng, had been secretly saved and raised in a secure location outside the palace for five years. After being reunited with his father, Zhu Youcheng was granted the title of crown prince and would eventually become the Hongzhi Emperor, notable for being the only Ming emperor to never take any concubines.

However, many scholars cast doubt on the forced abortions said to have been carried out by Consort Wan. For example, the Qing Qianlong Emperor rejected such stories. Moreover, the Chenghua Emperor actually had fourteen sons, most of whom outlived him.

Lady Wan died in 1487, 8 months before the Chenghua Emperor himself died after 23 years on the throne. He was buried in the Maoling (茂陵) Mausoleum of the Ming tombs. It is said that when he was informed of the death of Lady Wan, the Chenghua Emperor was unable to speak for an entire day, before stating: "Zhen'er has gone, I will follow soon."

Later, during the reign of the Hongzhi Emperor, Cao Lin (曹璘) proposed stripping away the title of Imperial Noble Consort from Lady Wan. However, the Hongzhi Emperor refused to do so out of respect for and fidelity to his father.

== Titles ==
- During the reign of the Xuande Emperor (r. 1425–1435):
  - Lady Wan (萬氏, from 1428)
  - Palace Lady (宮女, from 1432)
- During the reigns of the Zhengtong Emperor (r. 1435–1449) and Jingtai Emperor (r. 1449–1457):
  - Nanny (答應, from 1449)
- During the reign of the Chenghua Emperor (r. 1464–1487)
  - Noble Consort (貴妃, after 1461)
  - Imperial Noble Consort (皇贵妃)
  - Imperial Noble Consort Gongsu Duanshun Rongjing (恭肅端順榮靖皇貴妃, from 1487)

== Issue ==
- As Noble Consort:
  - The Chenghua Emperor's first son (14 February 1466 – November 1466)

== Depictions in Popular Culture ==
- Portrayed by Alyssa Chia (voiced by Qiu Qiu) in The Sleuth of the Ming Dynasty (2020)
