= Annals and Memoirs of the Court of Peking =

1914 book by Backhouse and Bland

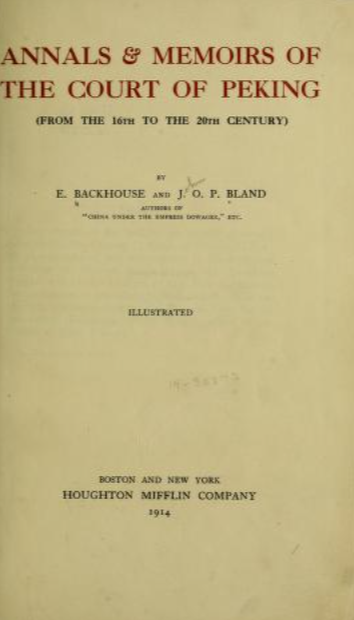
- Title page for Annals and Memoirs of the Court of Peking (1914)
- Author: Sir Edmund Backhouse; John Otway Percy Bland
- Language: English
- Genre: Non-fiction
- Publisher: Houghton Mifflin Company
- Publication date: 1914

Annals and Memoirs of the Court of Peking is a 1914 book edited by Sir Edmund Backhouse, 2nd Baronet and John Otway Percy Bland, published by the Houghton Mifflin Company.

The book covers a period circa 1614 to 1914. Much of the book has translations of materials from Chinese authors of various backgrounds. Some of the material is stated by the editors to either probably not be of a good veracity or to be outright untrue. Stanley Hornbeck stated in a review that "They serve admirably to acquaint the reader with" aspects of the Ming and Qing dynasties.

Reviewer William Churchill wrote that the Mandate of Heaven was a "central theme" of the work.

== Reception ==
Hornbeck argued that "The present work is not on the whole as consistent or convincing as was their China Under the Empress Dowager."
