= Diary of His Excellency Ching Shan =

Diary of His Excellency Ching Shan is a forged document promoted by Sir Edmund Backhouse, 2nd Baronet, and misrepresented as an authentic Chinese document.

A majority of the document, translated into English, is chapter 17 of China Under the Empress Dowager, a book by John Otway Percy Bland and Backhouse. The diary was originally written in Classical Chinese and uses East Asian cursive script. Backhouse falsely stated that the diary had an insider's view of the Qing dynasty government at that time. The diary became known worldwide in its English translation and not in its Chinese original. Lo Hui-min argued that this made the document "more sensational" instead of causing "suspicion".

Backhouse stated that he found the diary in 1900, and that Ching-shan was dead: Ching-shan was in fact still alive in 1900. According to Backhouse, after China Under the Empress Dowager was released, he sold the book. Reviewer Anne Birrell stated that these two factors show that the diary is not real.

Alastair Morrison, the son of George Ernest Morrison, wrote that Sinologists of subsequent eras would not have been taken in as easily by the document, and that "the initial success of the Ching-shan forgery to a large extent reflects the standards of Western scholarship on China and the decay of Chinese scholarship in the early years of this century." British Library employee Lionel Gates described the work as "the most masterly specimen of literary forgery in modern times."

Backhouse claimed that Jingshan wrote the diary. The diary also includes forged entries about Ronglu.

== Investigations into the authenticity ==
George Ernest Morrison, a Beijing-based journalist who worked with Backhouse and who did not know Chinese, kept saying the diary was faked since it was first released. Additionally, journalist William Lewisohn stated that the document was forged from multiple pieces of media.

Christopher Hibbert, author of The Dragon Wakes: China and the West, 1793‐1911, wrote to readers that the diary may be false, and that Backhouse had stated a belief that the diary was real up to his death.

In 1977, Oliver Edmund Clubb stated that several academic journal authors had proved that the Ching-shan Journal was not authentic back in 1930s, but that the conclusion was not yet widespread as their publications were "esoteric". Fred W. Drake of the University of Massachusetts, Amherst stated in 1978 that the diary was "long considered a fake". The knowledge was not widespread as the American Bank Note Company and the Foreign Office of the United Kingdom chose not to advertise doubts about such.

Ch'eng Ming-chou (程明洲 Chéng Míngzhōu), author of a review in Yenching Journal of Chinese Studies, wrote that the diary is "a fraudulent composition".

Hermit of Peking: The Hidden Life of Sir Edmund Backhouse (1976) by Hugh Trevor-Roper discusses Backhouse's work. Paul Theroux of The New York Times stated that Trevor-Roper's book proved that Backhouse had fabricated the diary and had a lack of candor when discussing it. Albert G. Hess stated that Trevor-Roper had "prove[d] conclusively" that the Ching-shan diary was made by Backhouse and was not real. Drake stated uncertainty on whether Backhouse himself had created the forgery, arguing the case was "circumstantial" and adding that "the question remains whether Backhouse" had forged a document in classical Chinese.

In 1991, Lo Hui-min published an article in which the author argued would "prove the Diary's forgery beyond doubt".

The diary has Ronglu state words that were said by Charles Maurice de Talleyrand-Périgord.

== See also ==
- The Memoirs of Li Hung Chang – A forged memoir
