= Ralph Paine =

Ralph Paine may refer to:

- Ralph Delahaye Paine (1871–1925), American journalist and author
- Ralph Paine Jr. (1906–1991), his son, American editor and publisher of Fortune magazine

== See also ==
- Ralph Payne, 1st Baron Lavington
