= Décadence Mandchoue =

Memoir by Sir Edmund Backhouse

Décadence Mandchoue: The China Memoirs of Sir Edmund Trelawny Backhouse is a memoir by Sir Edmund Backhouse, 2nd Baronet. It was first published in Hong Kong in 2011, by Earnshaw Books. There was later an abridged version published, as Manchu Decadence: The China Memoirs of Sir Edmund Trelawny Backhouse, Abridged and Unexpurgated. There was also a Chinese translation, published in Hong Kong by New Century Press.

It was prepared for publication by Derek Sandhaus. Because of the uncertainty of the work's veracity, Sandhaus stated that he was not sure on how to categorize the book.

== Background ==
Reinhard Hoeppli, a doctor from Switzerland, had asked Backhouse to write the work. Hoeppli was interested in the stories that Backhouse told. The work was written in 1943. At the time the work was written, Backhouse had been hospitalized, and he died in 1944. Hoeppli did not publish the work.

This was one of two volumes, along with The Dead Past, obtained by Hugh Trevor-Roper, in 1973. Fred W. Drake wrote that Trevor-Roper obtained it "under somewhat mysterious circumstances". Hoeppli gave the work to Trevor-Roper, and asked him to send the books to the Bodleian Library at Oxford University.

Trevor-Roper but did not publish it, and wrote Hermit of Peking instead, a work which damaged Backhouse's reputation by exposing his lack of candor in his writing. The work was located in the Bodleian Library and had not yet been published. According to Bao Pu (Chinese: 鮑朴), who was the head of New Century Press, the sexual content and Backhouse's damaged reputation meant that, for a time, people were not interested in publishing the book. Oliver Edmund Clubb wrote that Trevor-Roper's summaries of Décadence Mandchoue and The Dead Past portray "a Backhouse obsessed with sex, heterosexual and homosexual" as well as the man's "professed prodigies of accomplishment in that field of endeavour."

While doing research for an unrelated project, Derek Sandhaus, who was the head editor of the company he worked for, encountered the book. This resulted in its first publishing.

Joyce Lau of The New York Times wrote that, when Backhouse was active, "there was little information about China available in the West" and that people reading his content could not easily check his statements; additionally, Backhouse knew that Westerners had a preconceived notion of China being "an exotic, and erotic, fantasy world of empresses and opium smoke" and wanted content portraying such a world.

Bret Hinsch of Fo Guang University stated that, at the time, due to shame in Chinese culture regarding writing about sexual situations, there was a lack of published information regarding male-male sexual contact in China, a situation differing from that of Japan.

== Content ==
The work states that Backhouse had a sexual relationship with Empress Dowager Cixi. He also stated that he went to places for men who desired sexual experiences with other men. A house of prostitution for men seeking to have sexual relations with men is in the initial chapter.

The work portrays Backhouse as establishing a friendship with Li Lianying, which then segues into discussions on internal political issues.

According to Bao Pu, about 33% of the work consists of content about sexual situations.

The work argues that Cixi and the Guangxu Emperor died of murder, contrary to common historical points of view. Backhouse took the recorded last words of Catherine of Aragon and made them the last words of Cixi.

Kent Ewing of the Asia Times characterises the writing style as "overwrought Victorian prose" that is "bloated, ostentatious". The writing style uses words from Chinese, French, Latin, and other languages, with some sentences having words from multiple languages. It also makes references to different works of literature from China and various Western countries. Lau characterises it as "rendering a few parts hard to read, even if one has a background in those languages." Ewing argues that the writing "was quaintly antique at the time of his death but now [in 2011] seems downright absurd."

== Publication ==
According to Bao Pu, Mainland Chinese publishers were not interested in publishing the book if the sexual content was not excised. As of 2011, the work was not published in Mainland China.

== Reception ==
Ewing described the accounts as "interesting and amusing" even though "their worth may be highly uncertain". Ewing concluded, "In the annals of Sino-Anglo history, there is nothing else quite like Decadence Mandchoue", and that "For that alone, [the author] deserves his uneasy resurrection."

Hinsch argued that the situations depicted in the work were implausible, comparing them to the idea of a Chinese person in England saying he had a sexual relationship with Queen Victoria.

Trevor-Roper argued that the books were "pure fantasy throughout" and would not be reliable despite how it may on occasion reveal something about Backhouse. Trevor-Roper concluded that "No verve in writing can redeem their pathological obscenity." Commenting on Trevor-Roper's attitude, Ewing called him "a homophobic prude" who "may have been too quick to consign [the author] to the dustbin of history."

Reviewer William Matthews described the work as "an even more preposterous tower of self-aggrandizing fantasies."

Sandhaus argued that the work had value as a piece of literature and as a historical artifact.

In the Taipei Times, Bradley Winterton stated that it is "an extraordinary, astonishing and altogether exceptional book".
