= The Memoirs of Li Hung Chang =

1913 falsified memoirs of Chinese statesman

The Memoirs of Li Hung Chang (1913 version)

The Memoirs of Li Hung Chang (titled Memoirs of the Viceroy Li Hung Chang in the United Kingdom) is a book by American writer William Francis Mannix, published in October 1913 by Houghton Mifflin Company. It is a forgery, falsely stated by Mannix to be an edited memoir of Li Hongzhang. Mannix stated that the work came from parts of Li's diary. It was released in the United States and the United Kingdom.

The American Political Science Review wrote that the work had even misled "old China hands" and Sinologists due to the "great verisimilitude" of the book. The literary journal Renditions described the work as "a classic American contribution in the field of literary hoax". Christopher L. Miller, author of The Imposters, stated that the work was an "intercultural hoax".

The book was republished in 1923, with an additional piece by Ralph Delahaye Paine, titled The Story of a Literary Forgery, added to this version.

== Background ==
The 1911 Revolution had primed the public in Western countries to pay more attention to China. Mannix had, before the publication of the book, submitted forged diary entries of Li to newspapers, which published them.

The author wrote the book while incarcerated in Hawaii for eight months. In the jail he checked out many books about China and used them to write his work. Books he used as sources included Things Chinese by James Dyer Ball, Letters from China by Sarah Pike Conger, and The Awakening of China by William A. P. Martin. Matthewson stated that making money was "certainly" the primary reason Mannix made the book, though there is a lack of documentary evidence behind other motives. According to Dónal O'Sullivan, "it also seems that Mannix craved recognition for being an "expert"".

Extracts of the faked memoirs were sent to The Observer in the United Kingdom and The Sun in New York City and published there. The book publishing came later.

Albert G. Hess wrote that the fact that Mannix falsely claimed it was a translation and that very few people in the United States and United Kingdom could read Chinese meant that the false nature of the work was concealed from the public. Matthewson speculated that, in addition to the book making money, "there must have also been a sense of satisfaction" towards tricking scholars of China in the countries where the book was released. According to Paine, the false statement that the text was translated obscured its true nature.

Chinese Maritime Customs Service inspector Edward B. Drew contacted the publisher and gave his concerns about the veracity of the work. Li Jingmai, a son of Li Hongzhang, informed a Dr. Tenney in 1915 that his father did not create a memoir. Arthur Henderson Smith also stated a belief, in a letter he wrote about Li Jingmai stating that his father did not keep a diary, that the book could not have been falsified. Houghton Mifflin sent agents to China to check on the veracity of the book.

Sir Edmund Backhouse, 2nd Baronet told J.O.P. Bland that The Memoirs of Li Hung Chang was inauthentic. As Backhouse was later revealed to have forged multiple pieces of material supposedly from China, Renditions described the situation as "an interesting case of the pot calling the kettle black".

Ruth A. Benedict and Elizabeth M. Richards, two librarians, found records of the library loans that Mannix made while he was a prisoner in Hawaii and found that they matched the content of the forged memoir. According to Matthewson, the book only slowly lost its reputation because of the "incredibly powerful" stereotyping the book did, and this fed a feeling that "if not entirely true, it was true at least in part."

The public only learned that the work was a forgery in 1923. The publisher reclassified the book as fiction, and a new introduction was written by Paine, called "The Story of a Literary Forgery."

The new book also stated that Mannix was the author, and not Li.

== Contents ==
1923 version with the introduction by Paine

John W. Foster wrote the book's introduction. Mannix falsely claimed that Li had kept a diary, and that the book took 170,000 words of 1,600,000 words in the original work. that Mannix also claimed that Li's heirs approved of the book, and that he had gotten translation assistance from certain individuals. The book has a preface, in which Mannix said he wrote, in where Mannix made false statements about difficulties in translating documents. According to Matthewson, "These clarifications were meant to convince the readers of the truthfulness and the scholarly quality of Memoirs."

Amy Matthewson of the University of London wrote that the diary format "gave readers an opportunity to enter a would-be exotic culture while unearthing, as it were, the “truth” behind this public personality." Matthewson added that Mannix "was able to successfully fool an audience that included expert sinologists because the book repeated and reinforced existing notions about China and its people." According to Matthewson, the book fooled audiences through "uses of Chinese stereotypes and Mannix’s ability to manipulate trusted sources", and the book had its characters talk in "exaggerated deferential speech" which is a Western stereotype for Chinese behavior.

Paine's introduction of the 1923 edition gave the process on how Mannix wrote the book. This introduction has a length of more than 70 pages.

== Editions ==
There is a German translation, Memoiren des Vizekönigs Li Hung Tschang, translated by M. von Hagen and published in Berlin by Verlag von Karl Siegismund in 1915.

There is also a Chinese translation from 2015, 李鴻章回憶錄, translated by Zhao Wenwei (趙文偉) and published by Wu-Nan Book Inc. of Taiwan. There is a different Chinese translation published by Harbin Publishing House (哈尔滨出版社), with the English title Memoirs of Li Hungchang and the Chinese title 李鸿章回忆录. The translator of this mainland China version, from 2013, is Cui Shanshan. There is another mainland Chinese translation from Jiangsu Literature and Art Publishing House.

== Reception ==
Initially, in the words of Matthewson, readers were "captivated" by the book. Albert G. Hess stated that the book "fascinated" people living in Western countries. The Contemporary Review, The New York Times, and The Dial had initial positive receptions to the book. Matthewson stated that Mannix was "astute" in that he understood what specialists in China wanted to see. Paine stated that English-speaking academics were convinced of the book's veracity through how plausible the work portrayed Li, and Matthewson added that many of the academics did not know the "many intimate details of Li’s life". While some reviewers found material that was incorrect, they did not yet conclude that the work was forged.

Reviewer Frederick W. Williams, who released the review at the time the book was published, overall felt that the book was "considerable interest", but he stated that being unable to see the original material impaired assessing the work. Williams criticized perceived inaccuracies, and that the way the book credits translators (who were not real) made it difficult to find out who they were. Williams also stated "Some passages occur which are so unlike Chinese modes of expression". According to Matthewson, Williams felt that readers would like "continued maintenance of established ideas about Chinese people". Payson J. Treat stated in 1914 that the book was oriented towards readers from Western countries.

In terms of the entertainment value, Matthewson described the work as "a fascinating read" that is "Evocative and rich in detail".

Matthewson stated that, at the time the work was exposed as a fraud, "none of Memoirs reviewers or critics expressed concern that a white American usurped a Chinese identity."

Once the public learned The Memoirs of Li Hung Chang was false, Mannix experienced some instability with employment. He ceased selling forgeries, and worked as a business manager at the time he died.

== Legacy ==
According to Matthewson, the book showing a stereotyped version of Li Hongzhang meant that the voice of the actual person was crowded out, and that in effect Mannix harmed Chinese people by silencing them and stereotyping them.

Matthewson wrote that the work is "a reminder that preconceived ideas are powerful forces", and that The Memoirs of Li Hung Chang has value in pondering "difficult questions".

== See also ==
- List of fake memoirs and journals
- Diary of His Excellency Ching Shan - A forged diary
