= Liang Shitai =

19th-century Cantonese studio photographer

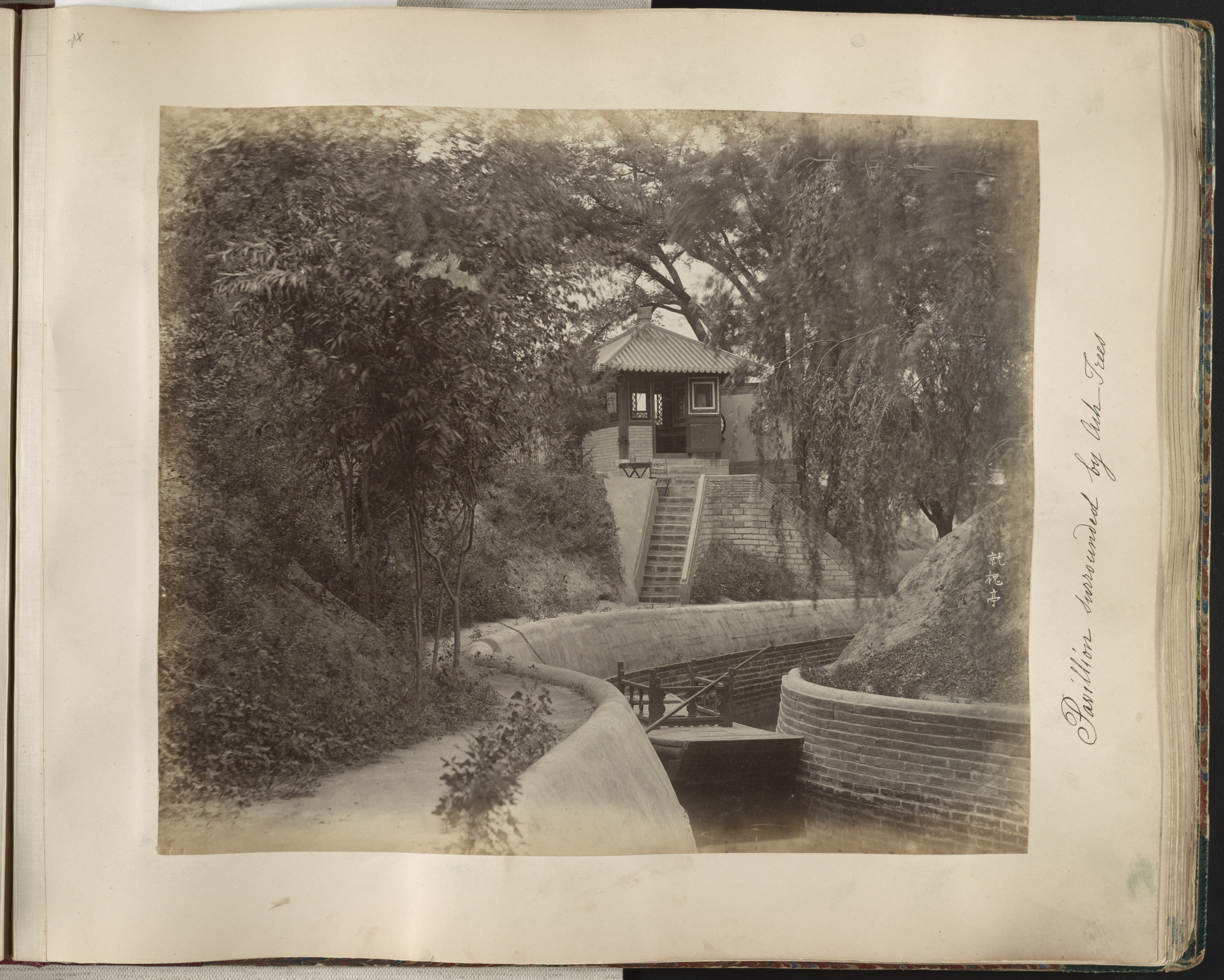
Pavilion surrounded by ash trees, Tianjin, 1888

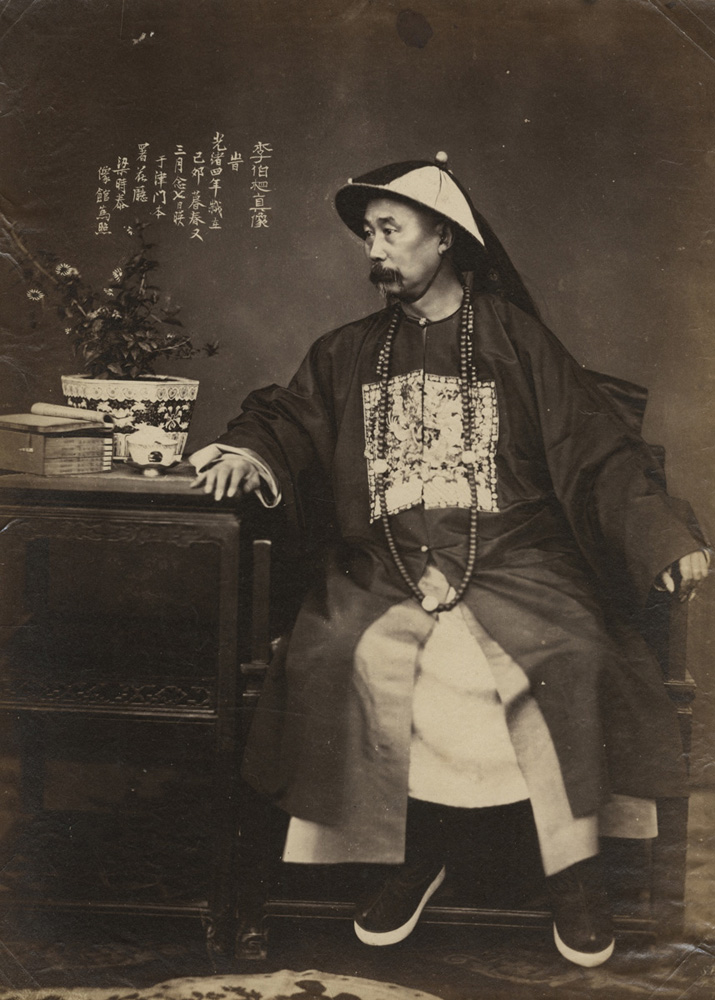
Liang Shitai, Li Hongzhang, c. 1870. Albumen print. Source: The Stephan Loewentheil China Photography Collection.

Liang Shitai 梁时泰 – also known as Liang Seetay – (fl. 1870s-1890s) was one of the foremost portrait photographers working in China in the late Qing dynasty. The artist specialized in portraits of high-ranking officials, and photographs that appealed to Chinese clients interested in literati painting. As one of the first photographers of prominent Qing Dynasty officials and other distinguished citizens, Liang Shitai's work convinced the Qing court to embrace photography as an artistic medium for the first time. He established his studio in Hong Kong in the early 1870s, then relocated to Shanghai in the late 1870s, and later to Tianjin in the 1880s. Liang Shitai's photographs are among the most historically important and visually exquisite of their time.

== Legacy ==
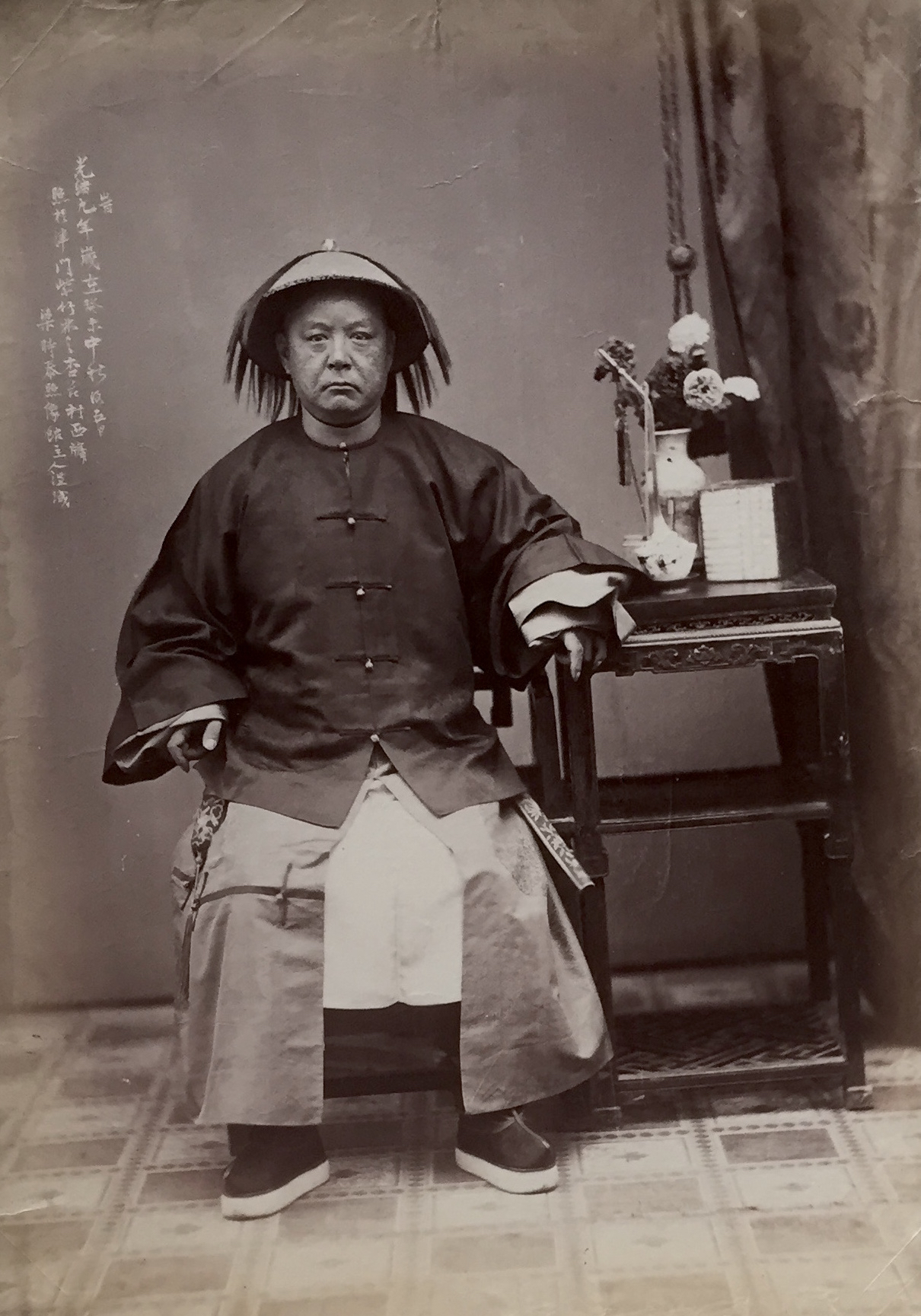
Liang Shitai. Portrait of a Governor, c. 1870. Albumen silver print. Source: the Stephan Loewentheil China Photography Collection

Liang Shitai is now recognized as a pioneer of early Chinese photography. Liang Shitai photographs from the Stephan Loewentheil China Photography Collection were displayed as part of the exhibition Vision and Reflection: Photographs of China in the 19th Century from the Loewentheil Collection, held at the Tsinghua University Art Museum in Beijing in 2019. The exhibition displayed 120 photographic “masterpieces” of 19th century China, including two albumen prints by Liang Shitai of Qing dynasty officials.

In contrast to the foreign photographers working in China at the time, Liang Shitai's work is notable for its adoption of the stylistic and aesthetic influence of traditional Chinese painting. Incorporating his background as a painter, many of Liang Shitai's images feature hand-painted embellishments, another identifying factor that separates his work from many of his peers. Liang Shitai's photographs are extremely scarce today, and can be found in prestigious collections such as the Stephan Loewentheil China Photography Collection, the Library of Congress, and the J. Paul Getty Museum Collection.

== Photographic works ==
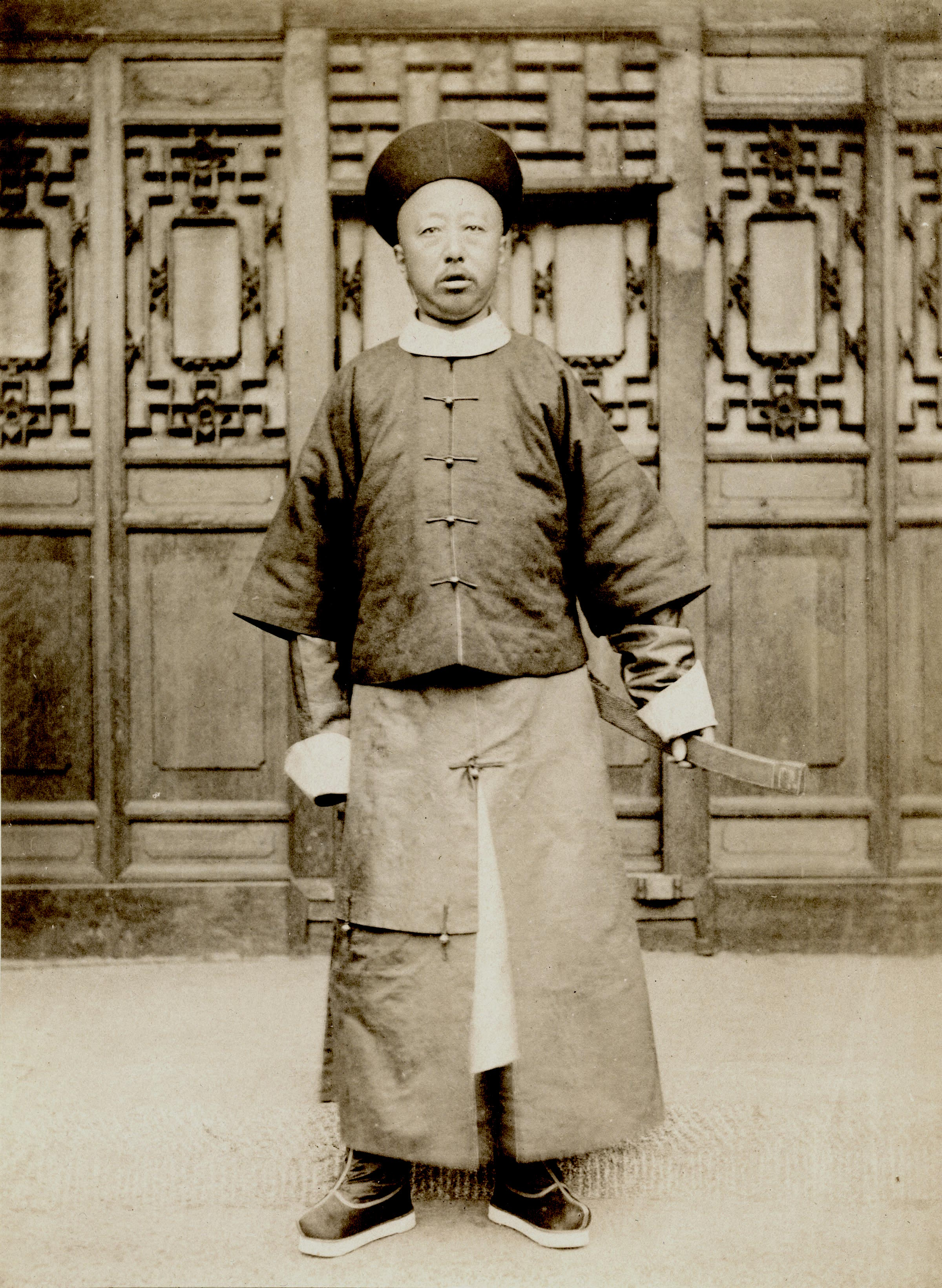
Liang Shitai. Prince Chun, 1870s. Albumen Silver print. Source: the Stephan Loewentheil China Photography Collection

Liang Shitai established his first photography studio in Hong Kong in the early 1870s, with the earliest published advertisement appearing in Hong Kong's Daily Advertiser in October 1871. By 1876, he had moved his studio to Shanghai, possibly due to increased competition in Hong Kong from photographers such as Lai Afong and Pun Lun. Yixuan, Prince Chun, who had become fascinated with the art of photography, hired Liang Shitai to take portraits of him and his family.

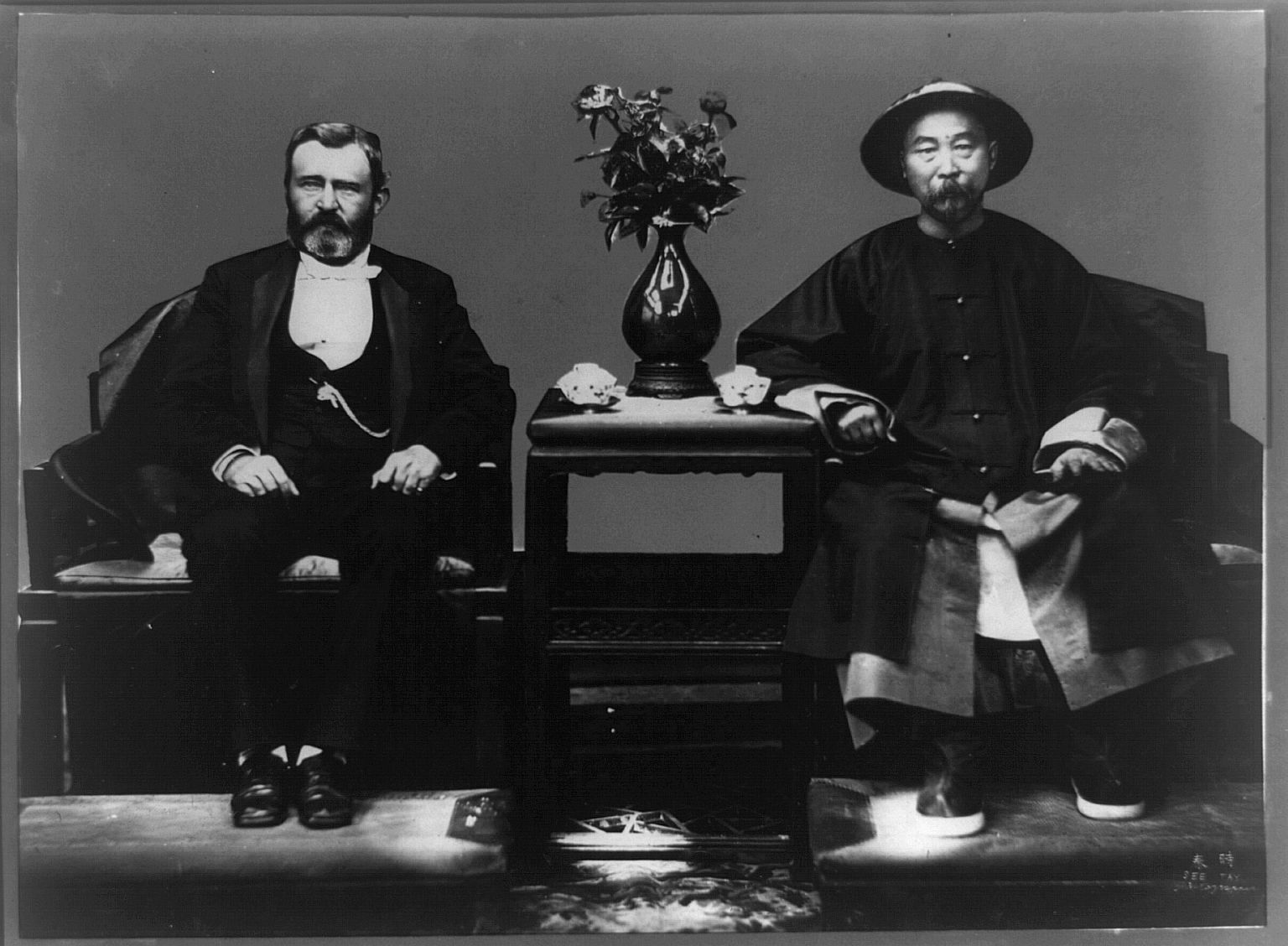
Liang Shitai, Ulysses S. Grant and Li Hongzhang, 1879.

Liang Shitai was one of the foremost portrait photographers active in late Qing Dynasty China. His portraits show a variety of compositional and stylistic techniques and show a clear link to the canon of Imperial portraiture. He is well known for his portraits of Zaifeng, Prince Chun, and his father Yixuan, Prince Chun, taken over a period of two decades. Of particular note to scholars is Liang Shitai's 1888 portrait of the elder Prince, taken near the end of his life, in which the artist "uses the elements of elite literati portraiture to cast the sitter in the familiar role of scholar at leisure ... augmented with auspicious symbols of longevity ... [which function] more as emblems or attributes than as personal possessions." Another one of Liang Shitai's notable subjects was Chinese General, politician, and diplomat Li Hongzhang, whom he photographed on several occasions, including in a remarkable 1879 dual portrait alongside former United States President Ulysses S. Grant.

Liang Shitai also offered landscape views of Tianjin, Hong Kong, and Shanghai.

== Chinese language sources ==
- * 洛文希尔中国摄影收藏
- 清华大学艺术博物馆、洛文希尔收藏编.世相与映像——洛文希尔摄影收藏中的19世纪中国[C].北京：清华大学出版社，2018.
- [英]泰瑞·贝内特.中国摄影史：中国摄影师1844-1897[M].徐婷婷译.北京：中国摄影出版社，2014.
- [英]泰瑞·贝内特.中国摄影史：1842-1860 [M].徐婷婷译.北京：中国摄影出版社，2011.
