= Hermit of Peking =

1976 book by Hugh Trevor-Roper

Hermit of Peking: The Hidden Life of Sir Edmund Backhouse
- Author: Hugh Trevor-Roper
- Language: English
- Genre: Non-fiction
- Publication date: 1976
- Publication place: United Kingdom

Hermit of Peking: The Hidden Life of Sir Edmund Backhouse is a 1976 book by Hugh Trevor-Roper. It is about Sir Edmund Backhouse, 2nd Baronet.

It was first published as A Hidden Life: The Enigma of Sir Edmund Backhouse in the United Kingdom in 1976. That same year, it was published in Canada by Macmillan Company of Canada under the original British title. It was first published in the United States in 1977 by Alfred A. Knopf, as Hermit of Peking: The Hidden Life of Sir Edmund Backhouse. Penguin Books published a revised version in the United kingdom in 1978. It was re-published as Hermit of Peking in 1993 by Eland Books, a British publisher.

The work alleges that Backhouse had created Diary of Ching-shan and falsely presented it as an authentic Chinese document. Fred W. Drake of the University of Massachusetts, Amherst stated that until the release of the book, Backhouse had a "scholarly reputation" and had avoided punishment for "illicit activities".

== Background ==
In 1973, Reinhard Hoeppli, a doctor from Switzerland who knew Backhouse in China, asked Trevor-Roper to give a book of memoirs by Backhouse to the Bodleian Library. Trevor-Roper became interested in Backhouse's life through the work and set to learn more about him. Drake stated that the book had been given to Trevor-Roper "under somewhat mysterious circumstances". The author intended to check whether the work was accurate, and if it could be published.

== Contents ==
The author shows parallels between the course of this work, and A. J. A. Symons' The Quest for Corvo. Trevor-Roper stated a belief that Backhouse found inspiration in Frederick Rolfe's (a.k.a. Corvo) letters, which had a sexual character. Reviewer William Matthews stated that Trevor-Roper had implied that there was "no documentary evidence for this connection", and that Matthews drew an inference that this was Trevor-Roper's conclusion.

== Reception ==
Paul Theroux of The New York Times compared the book to detective fiction, and that the work's author, at the end, "removes the veil from the aged humbug."

Drake stated that the book overall is "enormously entertaining" and "reads more like a detective story than a biography". Drake stated uncertainty on whether Backhouse himself had created the forgery, arguing the case was "circumstantial" and adding that "the question remains whether Backhouse" had forged a document in classical Chinese.

Molly Young, of The New York Times, stated that the work "is a merrily entertaining biography of a con artist" and that, based on the book, "Backhouse’s life would make a terrific video game."

Anne Birrell, a reviewer, wrote that "Sinology is indebted to" the author.

In a journal article, Matthews praised the book as "briskly and well written", "extremely funny", and overall "good historical detective work". Matthews praised the "restraint" of the author, so that the author's "contempt" for Backhouse did not interfere with writing the book well. Matthews criticized the attitude in the book's list of men who had engaged in same-sex activity - aspects in Backhouse's memoirs and the Corvo letters - who had then become devout Christians. Matthews stated that the list "is delivered with a sneer and is a rare low point in a fine, unique book."

Alastair Morrison, the son of George Ernest Morrison, wrote a critical review, arguing that the book wrongfully portrayed Hoeplli "as a simpleton", and that there were some errors in the referencing notes; Morrison also criticized remarks about George Morrison present in this book, accusing them of being "unresearched, unsubstantiated, unreferenced", and out of character with what others say about George Morrison.
