= Stuart Paine =

American Antarctic explorer and businessman (1910-1961)

Stuart Douglas Lansing Paine (October 18, 1910 – March 13, 1961) was an Antarctic explorer.

== Life ==
Paine was born in Durham, New Hampshire, the son of Ralph Delahaye Paine, author and journalist, and Katharine Lansing Morse. His older brother, Ralph Delahaye Paine, Jr., was editor and publisher of Fortune magazine and his twin brother was Philbrook Ten Eyck Paine. Paine attended Phillips Academy, graduating in 1929, and Yale University, graduating in 1933. He joined the United States Navy in 1939 and served as a naval attaché in Lima, Peru prior to US involvement in World War II.

He was on the second Antarctic expedition (1933–1935) of Admiral Richard E. Byrd, in charge of the expedition's dog teams. The expedition traversed 1410 miles by dog sled in 88 days and came within 180 miles of the South Pole. He wrote a book about the expedition called The Long Whip, and his diaries of the expedition were transcribed, annotated by his daughter, Merlyn Paine, and published by the University of Missouri Press. in 2007 as Footsteps on the Ice. Mount Paine in Antarctica, discovered in 1934 by the expedition, was named for him by Byrd. Byrd also named Mount Durham after Paine's hometown.

Later in life, he was president of a number of California manufacturing companies.
