= China Under the Empress Dowager =

1910 book by Bland and Backhouse

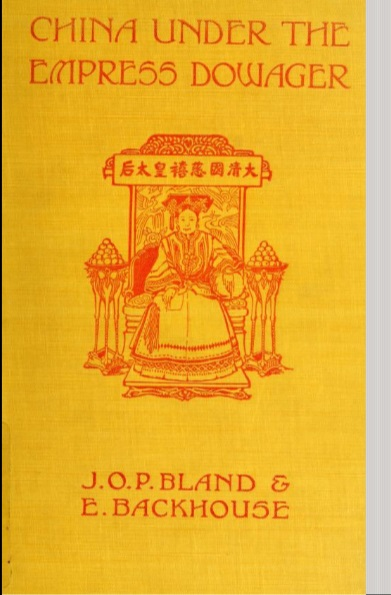
- Author: John Otway Percy Bland; Sir Edmund Backhouse, 2nd Baronet
- Language: English
- Subject: Empress Dowager Cixi
- Genre: Biography
- Publication date: 1910
- ISBN: 978-9881866745

China Under the Empress Dowager: Being the History of the Life and Times of Tzŭ Hsi is a book by John Otway Percy Bland and Sir Edmund Backhouse, 2nd Baronet, first published in 1910. Bland wrote the text and Backhouse supplied the sourcing material. The book is about Empress Dowager Cixi.

The book claimed to have an insider account of the Boxer Rebellion.

Some of the sources, including Diary of His Excellency Ching Shan, were later revealed to have been forged by Backhouse.

== Publication ==
The book was first published in October of 1910. In the first one and one half years after the first publication, eight printings were made, the last of which was in April 1912. Reportedly, Backhouse requested to have his name removed from the cover of the first edition, a request Bland denied, citing Backhouse's "over-humility".

In 1914, an abridged version was released, which omitted seven chapters.

It was published again as the "Peking Edition" in Beijing by Henri Vetch in 1939. This version has a ten page note arguing that it is based on legitimate sourcing. This note cited statements by J. J. L. Duyvendak, who had previously made statements saying the work was authentic, but by 1939 believed that the sourcing was forged and had submitted evidence that the work was a forgery. Duyvendak cited another review, stating that the misleading inclusion of Duyvendak's statements were wrongly giving undeserved credibility to the book.

== Contents ==
The book goes over the life of Tzŭ Hsi in chronological order, beginning with her parents (Chapter 1) and ending with the circumstances of her death and funeral (Chapter 27).

Chapter 17 includes the Diary of His Excellency Ching Shan, which turned out to be a forged document promoted by Backhouse. This chapter has a majority of the document translated into English. Reviewer William Matthews described the diary translation as the "centerpiece" of China Under the Empress Dowager.

The abridged version does not have chapters 5, 7, 16, 18, 19, 21, and 25. R. H. van Gulik wrote that these chapters were "considered less interesting to the general reader".

== Reception ==
Lo Hui-min stated that the book became so popular in a manner that both Bland and Backhouse had not anticipated, and that this associated, in the West, China with Cixi and her rule. The book was on university syllabi and located in libraries on land and on oceangoing vessels.

Chunmei Du (Chinese: 杜春媚; pinyin: Dù Chūnmèi), author of Gu Hongming's Eccentric Chinese Odyssey, wrote that the work became "an international best seller". Gulik stated that the creation of the abridged version demonstrated that the work was "greatly[...]in demand."

Gu Hongming criticised the book, arguing that it mischaracterized Cixi. Du wrote that Gu Hongming had a positive viewpoint of Cixi while Bland and Backhouse promoted a negative viewpoint. Chunmei Du wrote that the authors of this book, "especially" regarding Cixi, "became increasingly influential in shaping early twentieth-century global discourses on China".
