= William Francis Mannix =

American writer (19th century – 1920

William Francis Mannix (died 1920) was an author and forger. He was known for writing The Memoirs of Li Hung Chang, which he falsely presented as translated memoirs of Chinese politician Li Hongzhang.

== History ==
Sarah Matthewson of the University of London wrote that "Much of Mannix’s life remains a mystery." According to Albert G. Hess, Mannix's birthday was not known with certainty, and that fraudsters often embellish their histories; Hess stated "it is conceivable that even Mannix's wife and children did not know his exact birthplace and birthdate when he died." Hess stated that "Biographical data on a crook[...]are usually, and understandably, scarce and not always fully reliable." In 1911, Ralph Delahaye Paine estimated Mannix was more than fifty years old. Some accounts stated Mannix was born in 1870 and 1875. A 1920 death announcement stated he was 47.

Mannix originated from Boston. His father, Edward J. Mannix, originated from County Cork in Ireland, and had four male children older than Mannix.

Circa 1892, Mannix established the Adirondeck Pioneer, a newspaper based in Saranac Lake, New York. He gave names of prominent people vacationing there to newspapers based in larger communities. On several occasions, he falsely stated that a certain person was staying at multiple hotels at the same time, as a means of obtaining more money fraudulently. Eventually, newspaper editors learned about the deception.

Mannix at one point submitted articles to The Philadelphia Press and The New York Times. Mannix worked with Paine while they were colleagues at The Philadelphia Press.

He went to Cuba to cover the Spanish–American War and sent falsified accounts to newspapers. The Spanish government removed Mannix and sent him to Florida. O'Sullivan stated that the Spanish removal made Mannix get a reputation of being "an American hero".

Mannix, after the Spanish American War, was removed from his job at The Philadelphia Press, and according to Matthewson his reputation was damaged by the firing. His alcoholism began to manifest at this point. He engaged in fraud by making fake signatures to indicate sales that did not happen in his job selling encyclopedias.

Mannix briefly visited China in 1900 when he enlisted in the U.S. military and went to China during the Boxer Rebellion. During his time, he wrote a religious-themed poem involving a battle between Christians and non-Christians. He titled it "The Yellow Peril."

Mannix and returned to the United States and, there, engaged in acts of fraud. Mannix was incarcerated in Hawaii for making false checks, with a sentence for one year. Mannix's employer, whom the check was written in the name of, did not assist the prosecution and did not wish to see him prosecuted. While incarcerated in the Oahu Jail, he wrote The Memoirs of Li Hung Chang. He presented it as a work by Li Hongzhang that he had edited. He had used borrowed library books as inspiration to write the book. He left the jail after eight months due to a pardon by Governor of Hawaii Walter Frear. Frear had felt sympathy for Mannix and had allowed him to check out reading material.

The American magazine The Independent published two forged interviews by Mannix, supposedly of Yuan Shikai, with the first published on July 26, 1915. In response, the Chinese government criticized him for publishing forged material. In 1918, Mannix issued a pamphlet advertising a product which had falsely stated that Mannix interviewed Li Yuanhong, then President of the Republic of China, when in fact Mannix had not been in China to interview him, as he never went back to the country after his military stint.

Once the public learned The Memoirs of Li Hung Chang was false, Mannix experienced some instability with employment. He ceased selling forgeries, and worked as a newspaper's business manager at the time he died. A newspaper article stated that Mannix died on August 31, 1920, in Astoria, Oregon. The newspaper article stated he was 47. Hess did not find any obituary from The New York Times about Mannix. Hess also did not find any entries in encyclopedias about biographies.

== Scholarship on Mannix ==
Ruth E. and Edward M. Brecher attempted to write a biography of Mannix and had collected papers to do so. They obtained letters and records from Mannix's time in the military. The two never wrote the work. The papers were deposited with Princeton University. The collection has a note that labels Mannix's personality as being "psychopathic".

Albert G. Hess made a presentation about Mannix in 1977, titled, "The Dynamics of Literary Forgery: The Case of William Francis Mannix." This paper used a 1953 article in the Watertown Daily Times and content written by Paine as sources. Madelyn Kay Duhon, a student at Louisiana State University, wrote a master's-degree thesis on Mannix, and this was published in 2017. Amy Matthewson of the University of London wrote that the Brecher, Hess, and Duhon scholarship "tend to explain Mannix as a lifetime criminal or an unlikely creative genius with little attention to the book itself or its wider implications".

Hess was unable to find a photograph of Mannix. Duhon identified a photograph of Mannix that was present in the Ruth E. and Edward M. Brecher Collection and included it in her thesis.

== See also ==
- Americans in China
