= Li Hongzhang =

Chinese statesman and general (1823–1901)

Marquis Suyi of the First Rank Li Hongzhang GCVO
- 李鴻章
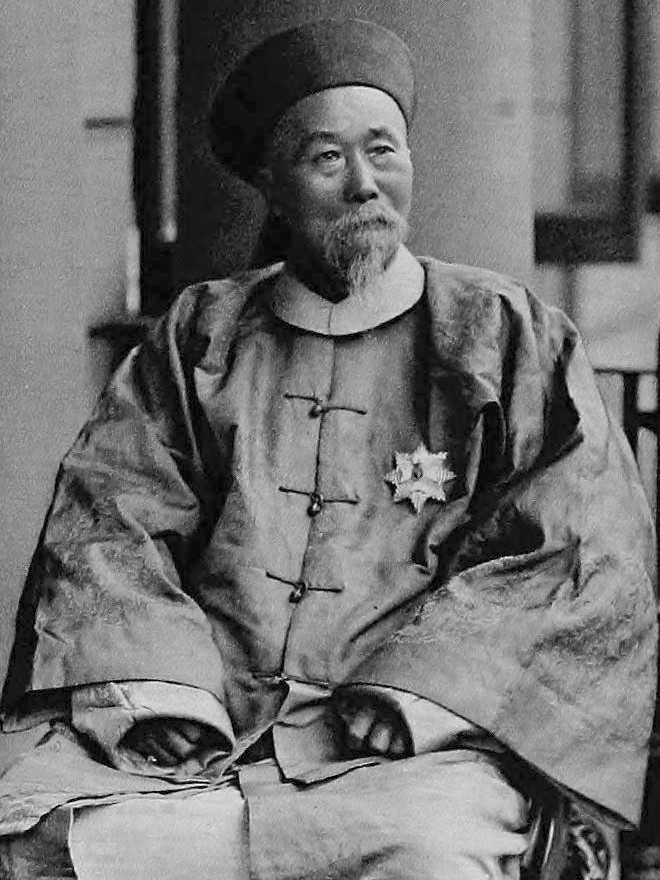
- Li in 1896

Grand Secretary of the Wenhua Hall
- In office January 9, 1875 – November 7, 1901

Grand Secretary of the Wuying Hall
- In office January 16, 1872 – January 9, 1875

Assistant Grand Secretary
- In office August 27, 1868 – June 22, 1872

Viceroy of Zhili and Beiyang Trade Minister
- In office July 8, 1900 – November 7, 1901
- Preceded by: Yulu
- Succeeded by: Yuan Shikai
- In office August 29, 1870 – August 28, 1895
- Preceded by: Zeng Guofan
- Succeeded by: Wang Wenshao

Viceroy of Liangguang
- In office May 24, 1900 – July 9, 1900
- Preceded by: Tan Zhonglin
- Succeeded by: Tao Mo

Viceroy of Huguang
- In office February 2, 1867 – August 29, 1870
- Preceded by: Guanwen
- Succeeded by: Li Hanzhang

Viceroy of Liangjiang (acting)
- In office May 23, 1865 – October 27, 1866
- Preceded by: Zeng Guofan
- Succeeded by: Zeng Guofan

Personal details
- Born: February 15, 1823 Hefei, Qing Empire
- Died: November 7, 1901 (aged 78) Beijing, Qing Empire
- Spouse(s): Lady Zhou; Lady Xiaolian; Lady Mo
- Relations: Li Wen'an (father); Li Hanzhang (brother); Eileen Chang (great-grandchild)
- Education: Jinshi degree in the Imperial Examination
- Occupation: Official, general, diplomat
- Awards: Order of the Double Dragon; Knight Grand Cross of the Royal Victorian Order; Grand Cross of the Order of the Red Eagle

Military service
- Branch/service: Qing Army
- Years of service: 1847–1901
- Rank: General
- Commands: Beiyang Fleet; Huai Army
- Battles/wars: Taiping Rebellion; First Sino-Japanese War

Li Hongzhang
- Traditional Chinese: 李鴻章
- Simplified Chinese: 李鸿章
Transcriptions
Standard Mandarin
- Hanyu Pinyin: Lǐ Hóngzhāng
- Wade–Giles: Li^{3} Hung^{2}-chang1
- IPA: [lì xʊ̌ŋ.ʈʂáŋ]
Yue: Cantonese
- Yale Romanization: Léih Hùhng Jēung
- Jyutping: Lei⁵ Hung⁴ Zoeng¹

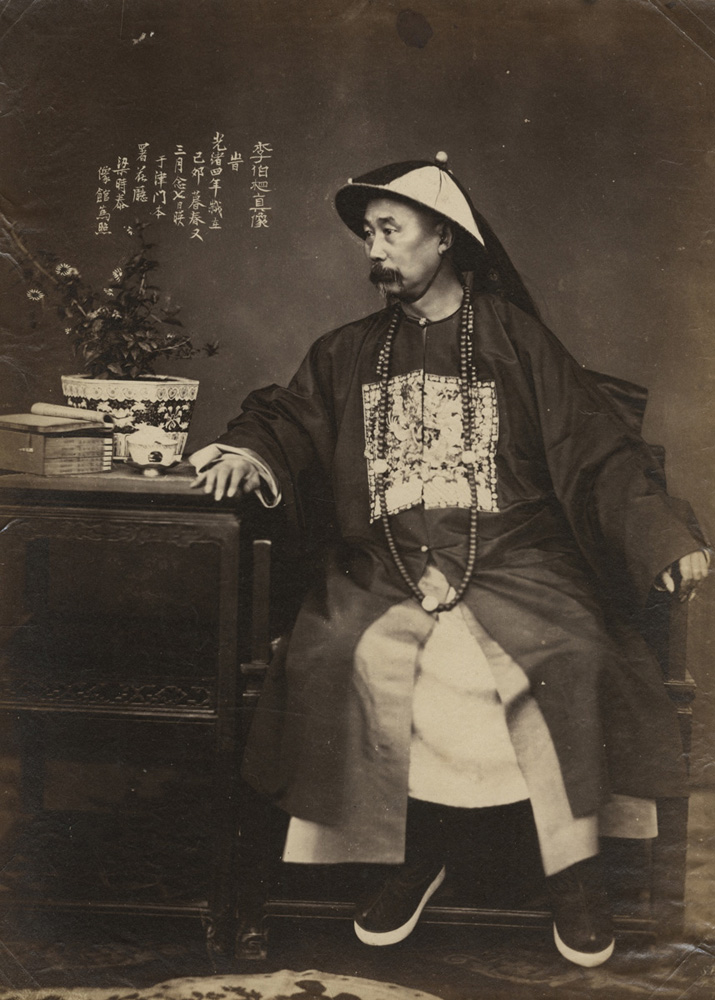
Liang Shitai. Portrait of Li Hongzhang. 1878. Albumen silver print. The Loewentheil Photography of China Collection.

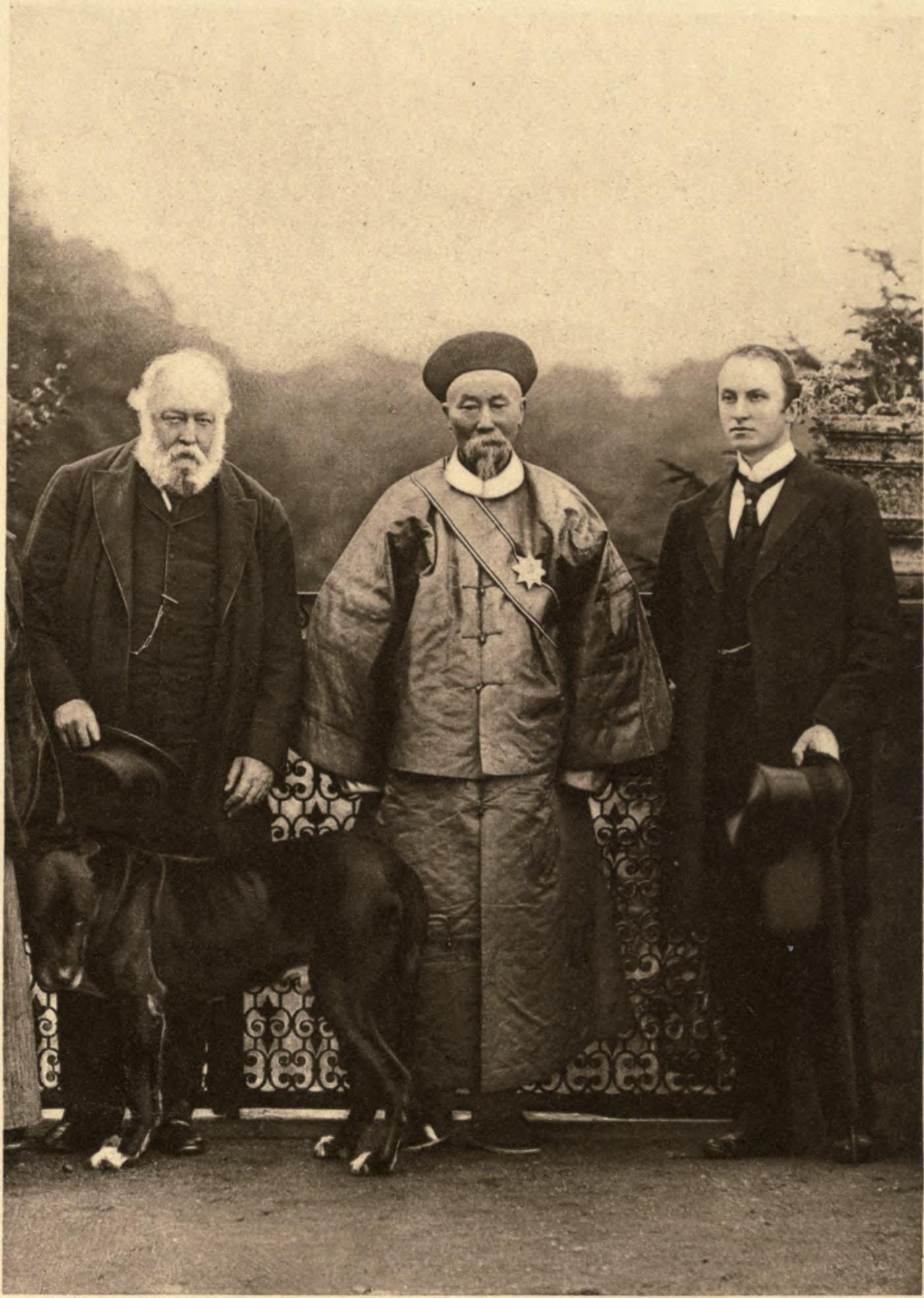
Li Hongzhang (middle) with Lord Salisbury (left) and Lord Curzon

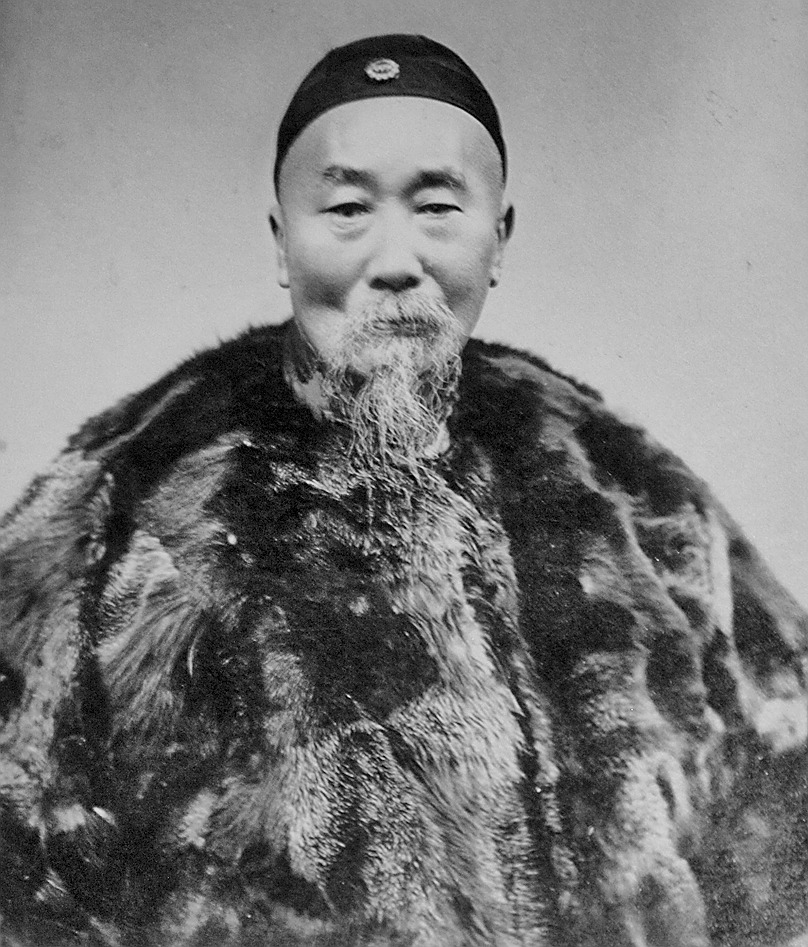
Photographic portrait of Li Hongzhang by Baoji Studio, Shanghai. Date unknown.

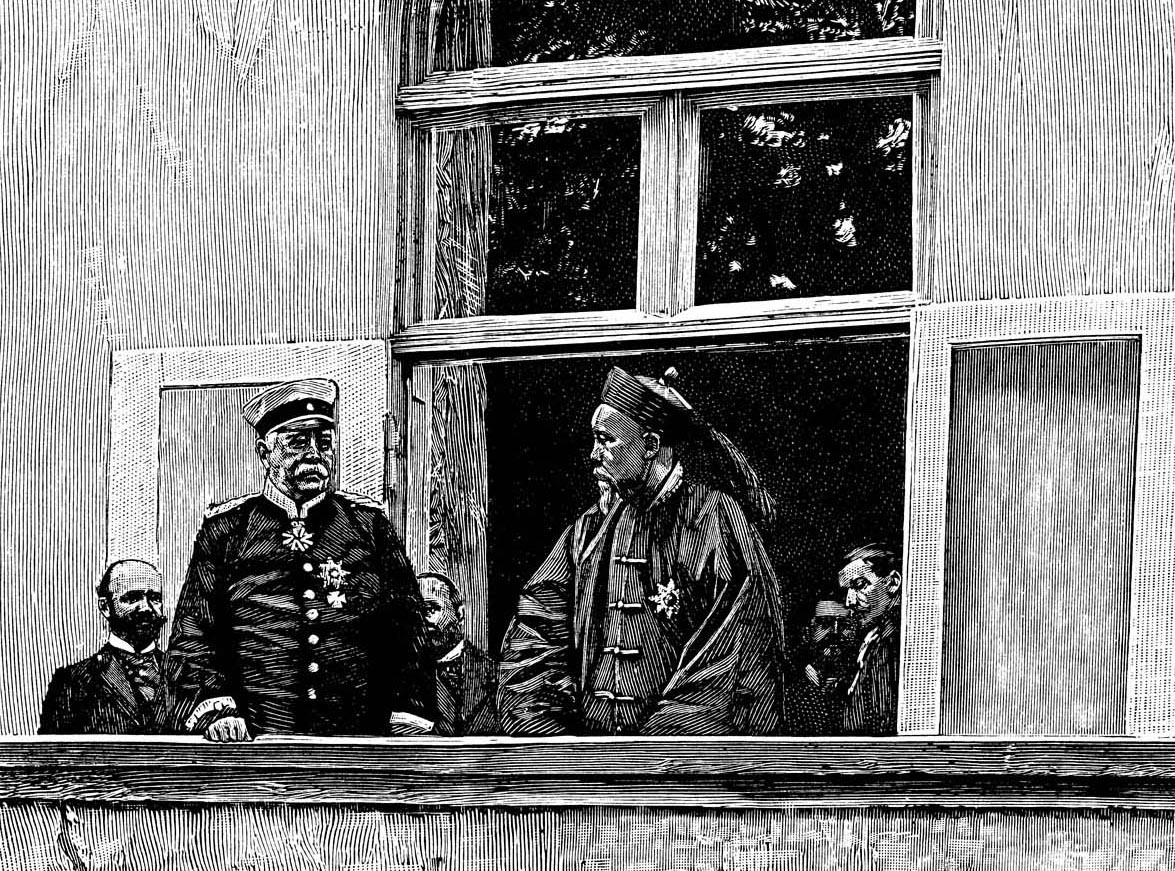
Woodcut of Li Hongzhang with Otto von Bismarck (left) in Friedrichsruh in 1896

Li Hongzhang, Marquis Suyi (Chinese: 李鴻章; also Li Hung-chang; February 15, 1823 – November 7, 1901) was a Chinese statesman of the late Qing dynasty. He held important positions in the Qing government, including the Viceroy of Zhili, Huguang and Liangguang. He was the founder and commander of the Huai Army and the Beiyang Fleet, and a leader of the Self-Strengthening Movement.

One of the best-known Chinese figures of his time internationally, Li was the face of the Qing court in foreign affairs and was often called the "Oriental Bismarck." He antagonized the British by supporting Russia as a counterweight to Japanese expansion in Manchuria, and later fell out of favor domestically following China's defeat in the First Sino-Japanese War. His legacy in China remains controversial, particularly over his role in suppressing several uprisings, his diplomatic record amid Western powers, and the mixed outcomes of his industrial and military modernization efforts. Nonetheless, Li Hongzhang is a renowned figure in Hong Kong as he is seen as one of the founding fathers alongside Qishan, Keying, Henry Pottinger, and Charles Elliot.

== Names ==
Li Hongzhang was also known by his courtesy names Zifu (子黻) and Jianfu (漸甫). His art names were Shaoquan (少荃), Yisou (儀叟) and Shengxin (省心). The posthumous name awarded to him by the Qing government was Wenzhong (文忠). He was also referred to as Li Zhongtang (李中堂) and Li Fuxiang (李傅相); "Zhongtang" and "Fuxiang" referred to his honorary appointments as Grand Secretary and Crown Prince's Grand Tutor respectively. He also held the noble peerage First Class Count Suyi (一等肅毅伯) and was posthumously honoured as First Class Marquis Suyi (一等肅毅侯).

== Biography ==
=== Early life and career ===
Li was born into a scholar-gentry family in Qunzhi Village (群治村), Modian Township (磨店鄉), 14 kilometres (8.7 mi) northeast of central Hefei, Anhui Province, China. In 1843, he sat for the entry-level imperial examination in Lu Prefecture and obtained a yougong (優貢; or gongsheng 貢生) position. His father, who was serving as an official in the imperial capital Beijing, was eager to see his son succeed, so he encouraged his son to come to Shuntian Prefecture to take the district-level examination. Li then travelled to Beijing. Along the way, he wrote ten poems under the collection Entering the Capital (Rù Dū 入都) to express his feelings.

In 1844, Li obtained a juren (舉人) position in the district-level examination, but failed to make it in the metropolitan-level examination. He then started taking classes under Zeng Guofan. In 1847, he sat for the metropolitan-level examination again and obtained a jinshi (進士) position at the young age of 24, and was admitted to the Hanlin Academy as a shujishi (庶吉士). At the same time, he also continued taking classes under Zeng Guofan to improve his knowledge. Three years later, he took the sanguan (散館) examination in the academy and earned the position of a bianxiu (編修; an editor).

=== Suppressing the Taiping Rebellion ===
In January 1851, the God Worshipping Society led by Hong Xiuquan started the Taiping Rebellion in Guangxi Province. Within about two years, the rebels had conquered many territories in southern China and established the Taiping Heavenly Kingdom with Nanjing as their capital. In 1853, the rebels, advancing from Wuhan, captured Anqing and killed Jiang Wenqing (蔣文慶), the xunfu of Anhui Province. The Xianfeng Emperor commissioned Lü Xianji (呂賢基), the Left Vice Secretary of Works, to travel to Anhui Province and recruit civilians to form militias to counter the rebels. Lü Xianji knew that Li was familiar with the local situation in Anhui Province so he secured permission from the imperial court to bring Li along with him as an adviser and assistant. Li was later ordered to remain in Anhui to oversee the militia. In late 1853, the Taiping rebels defeated imperial forces and captured Shucheng County; Lü Xianji committed suicide. In the following year, Jiang Zhongyuan (江忠源), the xunfu of Anhui Province, committed suicide after Lu Prefecture fell to the rebels. Li then became a subordinate of Fu Ji (福濟), the new xunfu, who ordered him to lead troops to attack the rebels, with Li often leading them in person. Li recaptured two counties and Lu Prefecture from the rebels within the following year. For his achievements, he earned the appointment of a daotai (道台; circuit administrator) and the privilege of wearing a single-eyed peacock feather in his hat. Later, he led troops into the Huai River area, but could not get along with his subordinates and was forced to abandon his mission.

In the winter of 1858, Li was reassigned to serve in Zeng Guofan's office, where he was in charge of drafting documents. Li led a carefree life, flouted rules and regulations, and often woke up late. Zeng Guofan once chided him, "Shaoquan, now that you're working in my office, I only have this piece of advice for you: 'Commitment' is the only thing that matters to us here." Li was shocked and he improved his behaviour after that. In the same year, Weng Tongshu (翁同書), the xunfu of Anhui, abandoned his post when he came under attack by the Taiping rebels. Zeng Guofan drew from Li's draft when he wrote a memorial to the imperial court to accuse Weng Tongshu of failing in his duty. The lines from Li's draft that were included in Zeng Guofan's actual memorial included: "It is my duty, as Your Majesty's subject, [to point out the failures of my colleague.] I do not dare to let this pass just because of Weng Tonghe's fame and prestige." Although Li earned Zeng Guofan's praise for drafting the memorial, he also caused Weng Tonghe (Weng Tongshu's brother) to bear a grudge against him for what he wrote. While serving under Zeng Guofan, he was put in charge of Yanjianshao Circuit (延建邵道) in Fujian Province but did not take up his appointment and remained with Zeng.

In 1860, Li was put in command of the naval forces in Anhui and Jiangsu provinces to counter the Taiping rebels. After Zeng Guofan's Xiang Army recaptured Anqing from the rebels in 1861, Zeng wrote a memorial to the imperial court to praise Li, calling him "a talent with great potential", and sent Li back to Hefei to form a militia. Li managed to recruit enough men to form five battalions in 1862. Zeng Guofan ordered him to bring his troops along with him to Shanghai. Li and his men sailed past rebel-controlled territory along the Yangtze River in British steamboats – the rebels did not attack because Britain was a neutral party – and arrived in Shanghai, where they were commissioned as the Huai Army. Zeng Guofan recommended Li to serve as the xunfu of Jiangsu Province. After gaining ground in Jiangsu, Li focused on enhancing the Huai Army's capabilities, including equipping them with Western firearms and artillery. Within two years, the Huai Army's strength increased from 6,000 to about 60–70,000 men. Li's Huai Army combined forces later with Zeng Guofan's Xiang Army and Charles George Gordon's Ever Victorious Army and prepared to attack the Taiping rebels.

From 1863 to 1864, Li led the Huai Army to attack and recapture Suzhou, Changzhou and other rebel-controlled territories. For his contributions, Li was awarded the honorary appointment Crown Prince's Grand Protector (太子太保) and an imperial yellow jacket. After retaking Changzhou, and capturing, interrogating and executing the rebel leader Chen Kunshu in 1864, Li received a jiduwei peerage in recognition of his achievements. An incident connected with the surrender of Suzhou soured Li's relationship with Gordon. According to an earlier arrangement with Gordon, the rebel leaders agreed to yield Nanjing to imperial forces on the condition that their lives would be spared. However, after the capture of Nanjing, Li ordered the rebel leaders to be executed. This breach of faith infuriated Gordon so much that he grabbed a rifle and wanted to shoot Li, but Li fled. By the end of 1864, the Taiping Rebellion had basically been suppressed by imperial forces. Li was awarded a noble peerage as "First Class Count Suyi" (一等肅毅伯) and the privilege of wearing a double-eyed peacock feather in his hat.

=== As Viceroy of Zhili ===
After the suppression of the Taiping Rebellion in 1864, Li assumed a civil office as the xunfu of Jiangsu Province for about two years. However, on the outbreak of the Nian Rebellion in Henan and Shandong provinces in 1866, he was ordered to lead troops into battle again. After some misadventures, Li managed to suppress the movement. In recognition of his contributions, he was appointed as Assistant Grand Secretary (協辦大學士).

In 1867, Li was appointed as the Viceroy of Huguang, where he remained until 1870, when the Tianjin Massacre necessitated his transfer to Tianjin to handle the diplomatic crisis with the French. He was given the concurrent appointments as Viceroy of Zhili Province and Beiyang Trade Minister (北洋通商大臣) to oversee various issues in Zhili, Shandong and Fengtian provinces, including trade, tariffs, diplomacy, coastal defence, and modernisation. He was also conferred the honorary position of "Grand Secretary of Wenhua Hall" (文華殿大學士).

From the time he became Viceroy of Zhili and Beiyang Trade Minister until his death, with a few intervals of retirement, he shaped the Qing Empire's foreign policy to a large extent. In 1876, he signed the Yantai Treaty with Sir Thomas Wade to end a diplomatic crisis with Britain caused by the murder of Augustus Raymond Margary in Yunnan Province. He also arranged treaties with Peru and the Tianjin Convention with Japan, and directed Chinese foreign policy in Korea. Among Li's projects to open China to the world on Chinese terms was support for the Chinese Educational Mission, which sent Chinese boys to the United States for education, starting in 1872. The mission was aborted in 1881.

On the death of the Tongzhi Emperor in 1875, Li introduced a large army into the capital and effected a coup which placed the Guangxu Emperor on the throne under the regency of the Empress Dowagers Ci'an and Cixi. In 1879, Li was awarded the honorary appointment Crown Prince's Grand Tutor (太子太傅).

In 1886, on the conclusion of the Sino-French War, Li arranged a treaty with the French. Li was impressed with the necessity of strengthening the Qing Empire, and while he was Viceroy of Zhili, he raised a large well-drilled and well-armed force, and spent vast sums both in fortifying Port Arthur and the Dagu forts and in strengthening the navy. For years, he had watched the successful reforms effected in Japan and had a well-founded dread of coming into conflict with the Japanese.

=== Establishing military academies ===
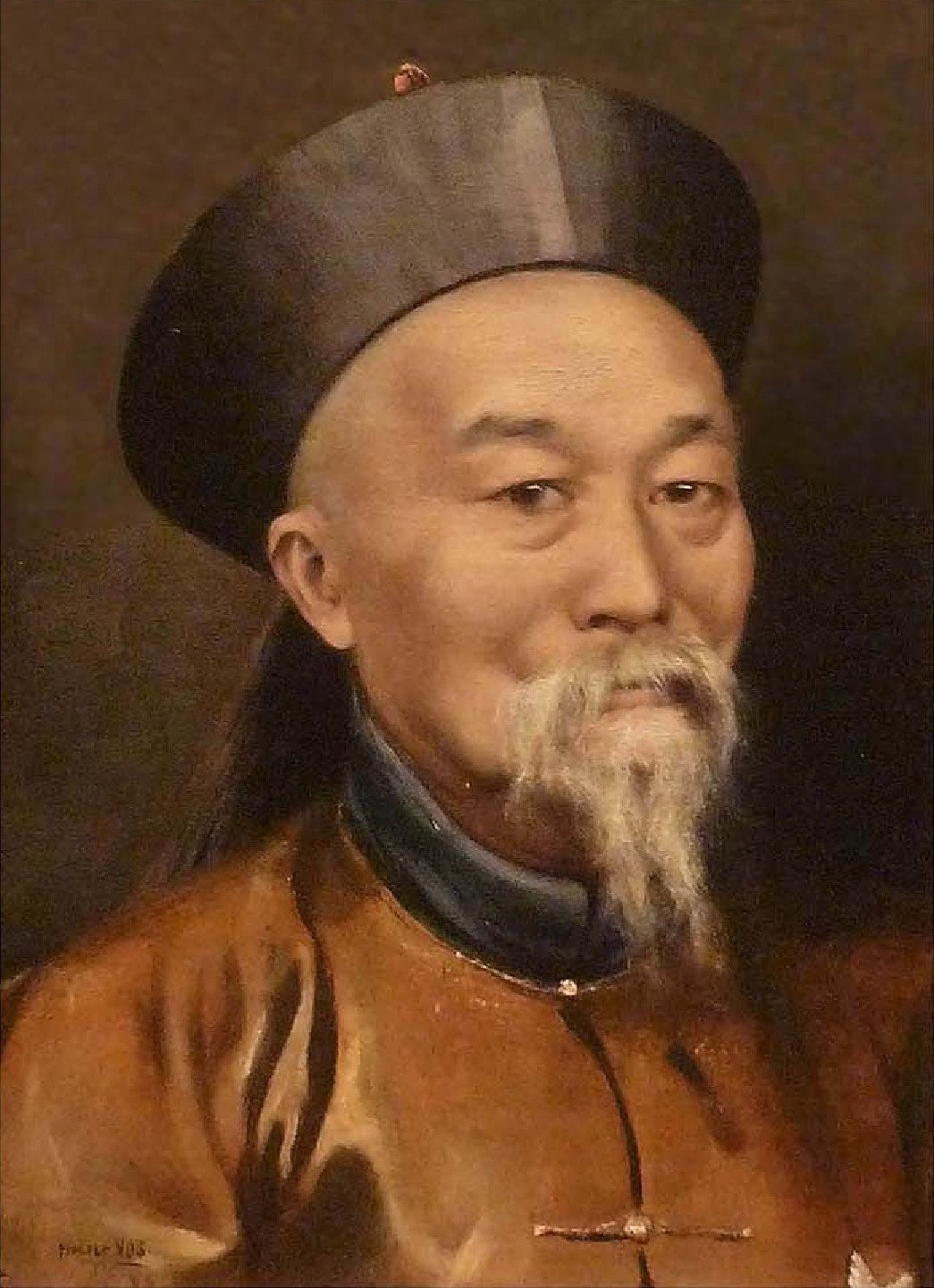
A painting of Li Hongzhang

In 1885, Li founded the Tianjin Military Academy (天津武備學堂) to train Chinese military officers as part of his military reforms. The move was supported by Huai Army commander Zhou Shengchuan. The academy was to serve Huai Army and Green Standard Army officers. Various practical military, mathematics and science subjects were taught at the academy. The instructors were German military officers. Another programme was started at the academy for five years in 1887 to train teenagers as new military officers. Mathematics, practical and technical subjects, sciences, foreign languages, Chinese classics and history were taught at the school. Students also took exams. The Weihaiwei and Shanhaiguan military schools copied the Tianjin Military Academy's curriculum. The maritime defence fund supplied the budget for the Tianjin Military Academy, which was shared with the Tianjin Naval Academy.

=== First Sino-Japanese War ===
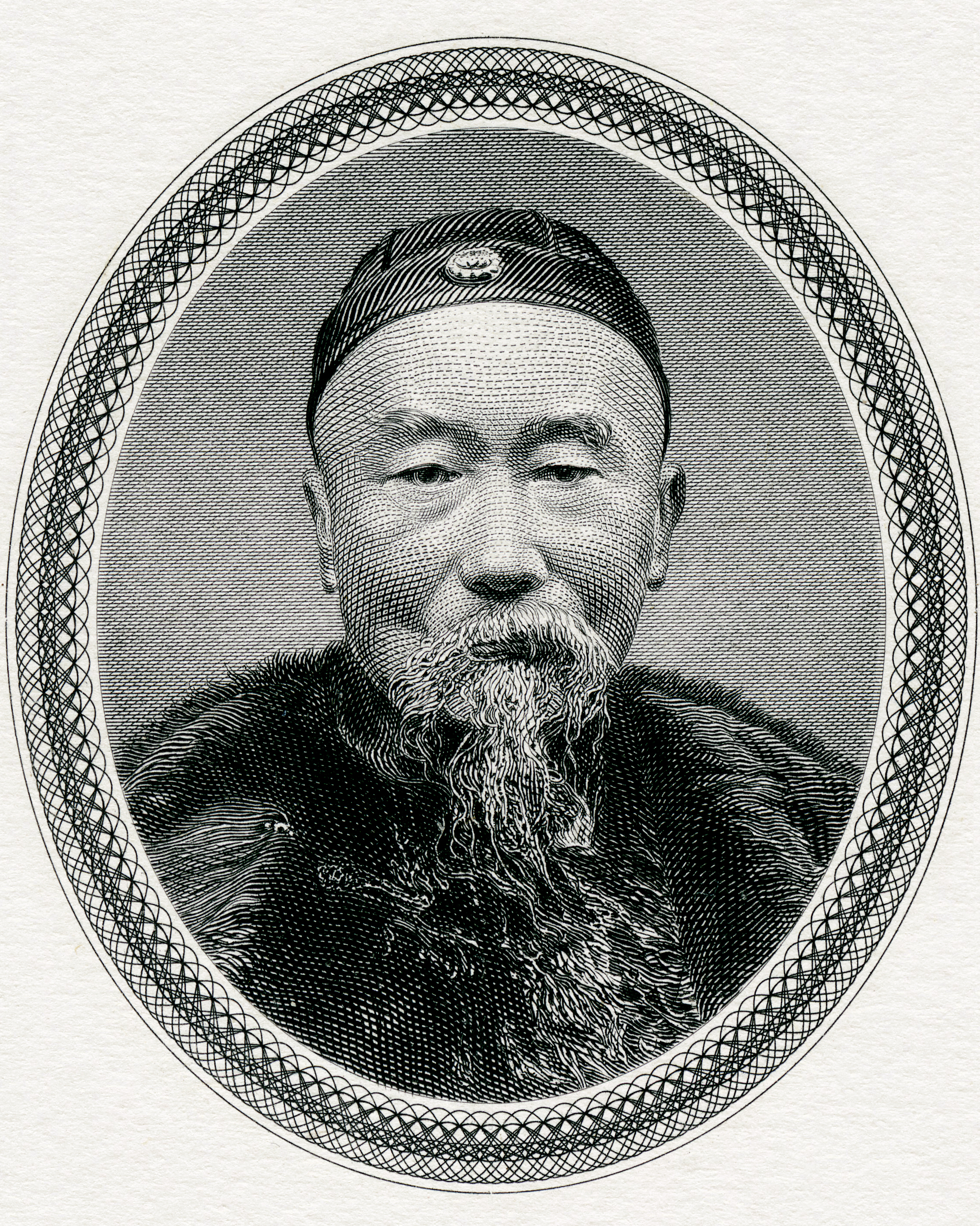
Li Hongzhang in U.S. Government engraved portrait

Because of his prominent role in Chinese diplomacy in Korea and strong political connections in Manchuria, Li found himself directing Chinese forces during the First Sino-Japanese War of 1894–1895. In fact, it was mostly the armies that he established and controlled that did the fighting, whereas other Chinese troops led by his political rivals did not come to their aid. Rampant corruption further weakened the Chinese military. For instance, one official misappropriated ammunition funds for personal use. As a result, shells ran out during battle, forcing one navy captain, Deng Shichang, to resort to ordering his ship to ram an enemy ship. The defeat of Li's modernised armed forces by the Japanese undermined his political standing, as well as the wider cause of the Self-Strengthening Movement.

Li had received the privilege of wearing a three-eyed peacock feather in his hat – a rare exception because three-eyed peacock feathers had previously been restricted to only members of the imperial clan – during Empress Dowager Cixi's 60th birthday celebrations in 1894. However, after the Chinese defeat in the war, Li was disgraced and stripped of his peacock feather. The Qing imperial court initially wanted to send Zhang Yinhuan (張蔭桓) and Shao Youlian (邵友濂) as their representatives to negotiate with the Japanese, but the Japanese rejected them. Li was selected to take on this mission and was given back his peacock feather.

On March 24, 1895, while negotiating with Japan's Prime Minister Itō Hirobumi and Foreign Affairs Minister Mutsu Munemitsu in Shimonoseki, Li was attacked by an assassin, Koyama Toyotarō (小山豐太郎), who shot him in the left cheek. Koyama was arrested by Japanese police later and he claimed that he desired for the war to continue.

Due to the public embarrassment caused by the attack, the Japanese agreed to the immediate ceasefire Li had urged in the days before, though fighting would continue on Taiwan and in the Penghu Islands. On April 17, 1895, Li signed the Treaty of Shimonoseki with the Japanese, thus ending the First Sino-Japanese War.

=== Tour of Russia, Europe and North America ===
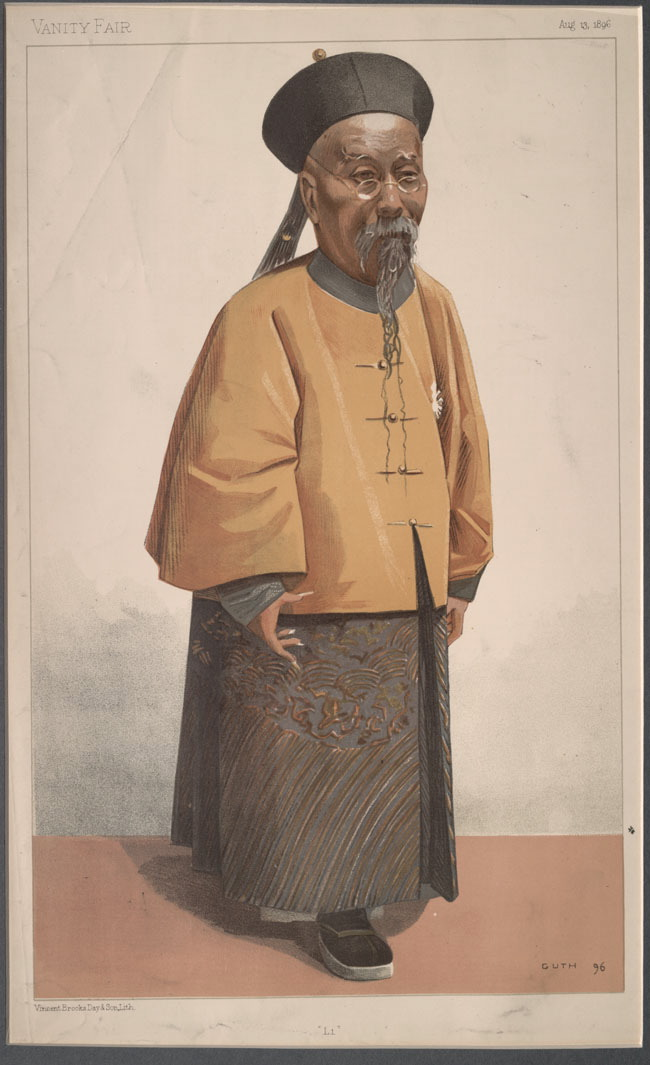
Hongzhang by Guth in Vanity Fair, August 13, 1896

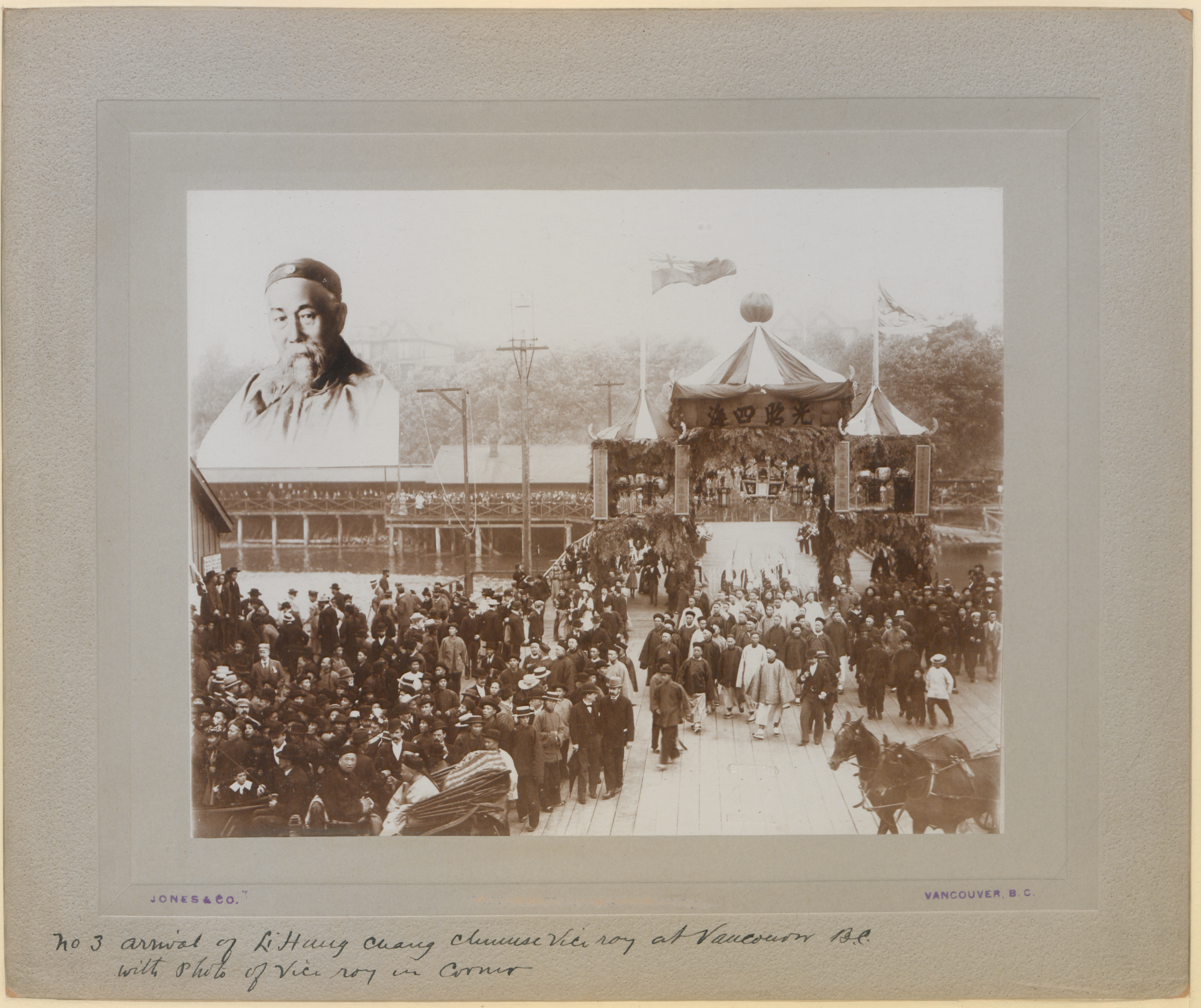
Hongzhang's arrival at Vancouver in 1896

In 1896, Li attended the coronation of Nicholas II of the Russian Empire on behalf of the Qing Empire and toured Europe, Canada and the United States, where he advocated reform of the American immigration policies that had greatly restricted Chinese immigration after the Chinese Exclusion Act of 1882 (renewed in 1892). In 1896, he was hosted by British prime minister William Ewart Gladstone at Hawarden Castle in Wales.

In a famous interview published by The New York Times on September 3, 1896, Li was asked whether he favored the introduction of the newspaper into China as developed in the U.S. or in Europe. Li's answer was stunningly honest: "There are newspapers in China, but the Chinese editors, unfortunately, do not tell the truth. They do not, as your papers, tell 'the truth, whole truth, and nothing but the truth.' The editors in China are great economizers of the truth; they tell only a part of it. They do not have, therefore, the great circulations that your papers have. Because this economy of the truth, our papers fail in the mission of a great press, to be one of the means of civilization."

While in Britain, he toured parts of the country by train, keeping with his desire to inspire railway development in his own country while constantly fighting against the prejudices of conservative leaders. He visited the industrial area in Barrow, North West England, and toured Lake Windermere on the steamer Tern operated by the Furness Railway Company. He also witnessed the 1896 Royal Naval Fleet Review at Spithead. It was during his visit to Britain in 1896 that Queen Victoria made him a Knight Grand Cross of the Royal Victorian Order.

=== Boxer Rebellion and death ===
In 1900, Li once more played a major diplomatic role in negotiating a settlement with the Eight-Nation Alliance forces which had invaded Beijing to put down the Boxer Rebellion. His early position was that the Qing Empire was making a mistake by supporting the Boxers against the foreign powers. During the Siege of the International Legations, Sheng Xuanhuai and other provincial officials suggested that the Qing imperial court give Li full diplomatic power to negotiate with foreign powers. Li telegraphed back to Sheng Xuanhuai on June 25, describing the declaration of war a "false edict". This tactic gave the "Southeast Mutual Protection" provincial officials a justification not to follow Empress Dowager Cixi's declaration of war. Li refused to accept orders from the government for more troops when they were needed to fight against the foreigners, which he had available. Li controlled the Chinese telegraph service, whose despatches asserted falsely that Chinese forces had exterminated all foreigners in the siege and convinced many foreign readers.

In 1901, Li was the principal Chinese negotiator with the foreign powers which captured Beijing. On September 7, 1901, he signed the Boxer Protocol ending the Boxer Rebellion, and obtained the departure of the Eight-Nation Alliance at the price of huge indemnities for the Chinese. Exhausted from the negotiations, he died from liver inflammation two months later at Xianliang Temple in Beijing. The Guangxu Emperor posthumously honoured Li as Marquis Suyi of the First Class (一等肅毅候). This peerage was inherited by Li Guojie, who was assassinated in Shanghai on February 21, 1939, allegedly as a result of his support for the Nanking Reformed Government. Before his death, Li Hongzhang was said to have written a final poem:

Worn out from constant travel, the horses are still saddled; only at the moment of crisis does one learn how hard it is to die.
勞勞車馬未離鞍, 臨事方知一死難.
The nation's fortunes has been wounded for three hundred years; the people's sufferings are mourned far from eight thousand miles.
三百年來傷國步, 八千里外弔民殘.
Autumn wind, treasured sword—tears of a lone loyal minister; setting sun, banners and standards—on the grand general's altar.
秋風寶劍孤臣淚, 落日旌旗大將壇.
Overseas the dust of turmoil has not yet settled; pray my comrades will not let these matters belittled.
海外塵氛猶未息, 請君莫作等閒看.

== Family ==
Li's ancestral family name was actually Xǔ (許). His ancestors had migrated from Hukou, Jiangxi Province to Hefei, Anhui Province. Li's eighth-great-grandfather, Xu Yingxi (許迎溪), had given up his second son, Xu Shen (許慎), for adoption by a relative, Li Xinzhuang (李心莊). Xu Shen and his descendants had taken Li (李) to be their family name since then. Li's father, Li Wen'an (李文安; 1801–1855), obtained a jinshi degree in the imperial examination in 1838 – the same year as Zeng Guofan. Li Wen'an also served as a langzhong (郎中) in the Ministry of Justice.

Li had one elder brother and four younger brothers; he was the second son in his family. His elder brother, Li Hanzhang (李瀚章; 1821–1899), served as a xunfu and zongdu in a number of provinces. His third brother, Li Hezhang (李鶴章; 1825–1880), served as a military officer. His fourth brother was Li Yunzhang (李蘊章), his fifth brother was Li Fengzhang (李鳳章), and his sixth brother was Li Zhaoqing (李昭慶; 1835–1873).

Li's first primary spouse, Lady Zhou (周氏), bore him a son, Li Jingyu (李經毓), who died prematurely. Lady Zhou died of illness in 1861.

Li's second primary spouse, Zhao Xiaolian (趙小蓮), bore him another son, Li Jingshu (李經述). Li Jingshu inherited his father's peerage as Marquis Suyi (肅毅侯), but died early. Li Jingshu's son, Li Guojie (李國傑; 1881–1939), inherited the Marquis Suyi peerage and served in a number of official positions in the final years of the Qing dynasty. He became an official and industrialist in the Republic of China later. Li Guojie also married the daughter of Natong (那桐; 1857–1925), who served in the Grand Secretariat and Grand Council.

Li's secondary spouse, Lady Mo (莫氏), bore him three sons: Li Jingyuan (李經遠), Li Jingmai (李經邁; 1876–1938) and Li Jingjin (李經進). Among the three, only Li Jingmai survived into adulthood. He served as the Qing Empire's Ambassador to Austria-Hungary and a Right Vice Secretary (右侍郎) in the Ministry of Civil Affairs (民政部).

Li had three daughters. One of them, Li Ju'ou (李菊藕), married Zhang Peilun (1848–1903) and bore the father of the writer Eileen Chang (1920–1995). The other two daughters married Guo Enhou (郭恩垕), the magistrate of Weifang County, and Ren Dehe (任德和), the zhushi (主事) of Yixing County.

Li also adopted Li Jingfang (1855–1934), a son of his sixth brother Li Zhaoqing. Li Jingfang served as the Qing Empire's Ambassador to Japan and a Left Vice Secretary (左侍郎) in the Ministry of Post and Telecommunications (郵傳部).

His grandson, Li Shiu Tong, would become a sexologist known for his work and relationship with his mentor and romantic partner Magnus Hirschfeld, and would posthumously be recognized as a researcher in his own right following the rediscovery of his manuscripts.

== Honours ==
- Imperial Order of the Double Dragon (China)
- Honorary Knight Grand Cross of the Royal Victorian Order (United Kingdom).
- Grand Cross of the Order of the Red Eagle, in Diamonds (Germany), June 14, 1896

== Legacy and assessment ==
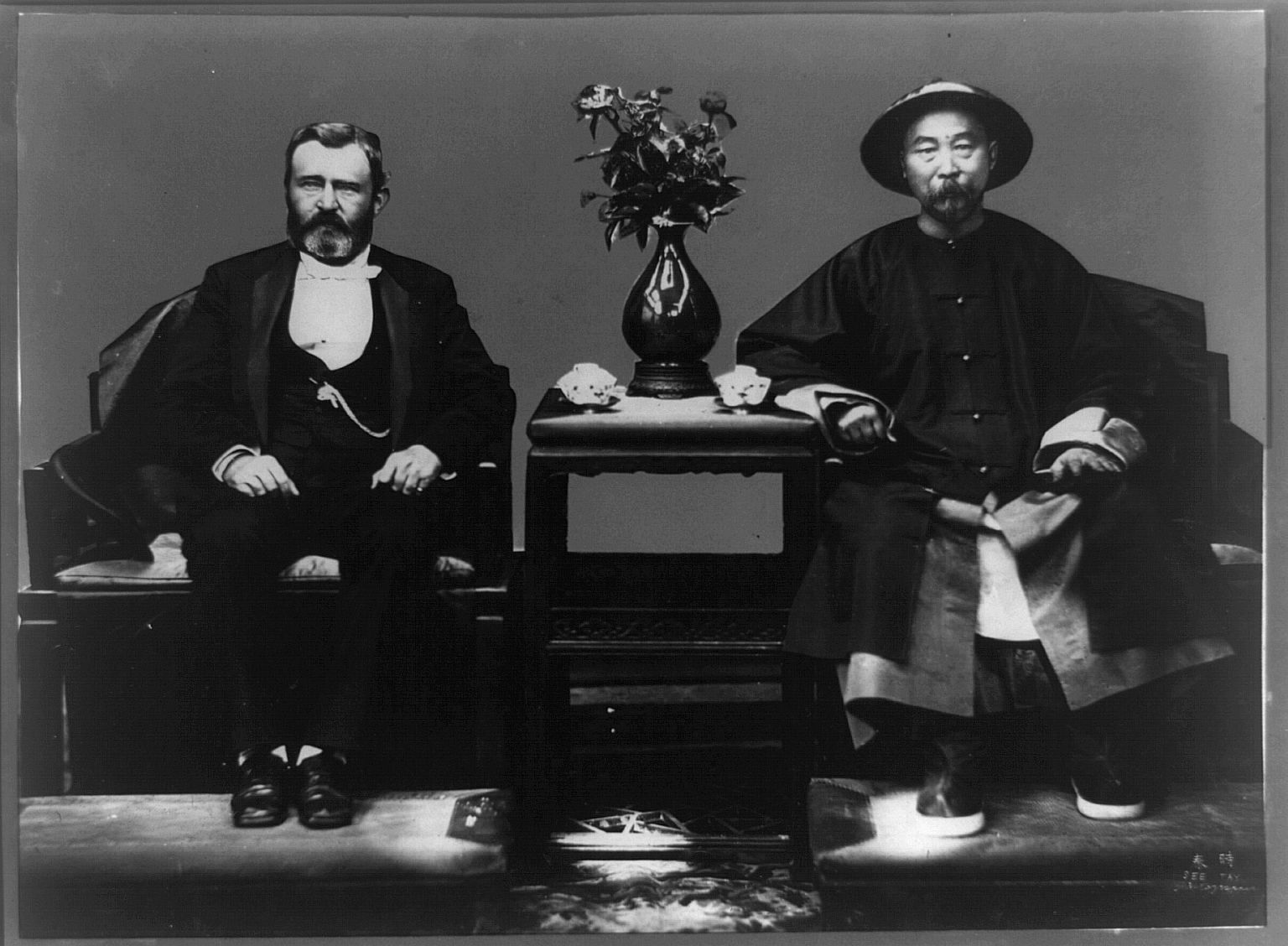
Li (right) photographed with former American president Ulysses S. Grant, 1879, by Liang Shitai

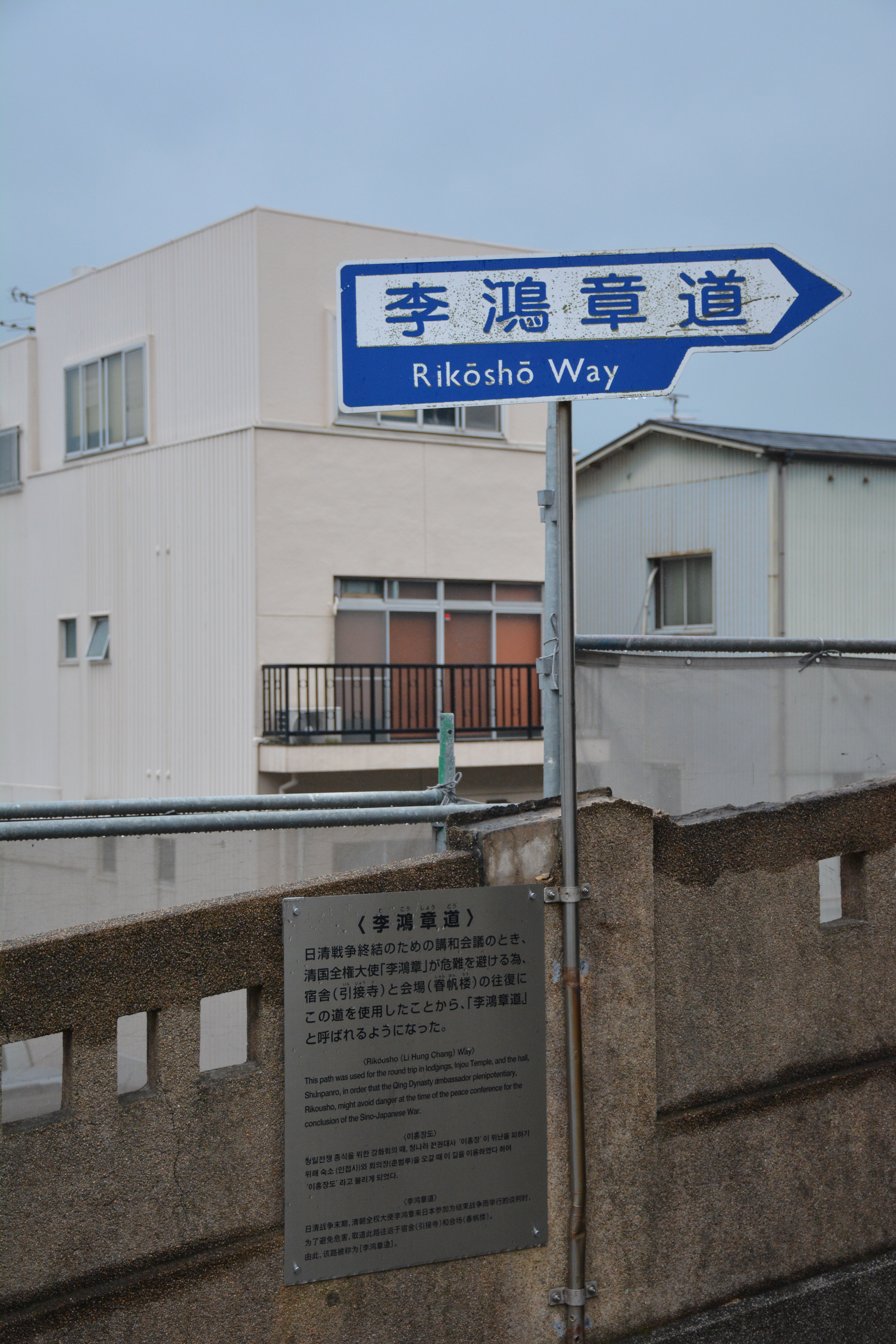
Rikōshō Way in Shimonoseki, Japan

After the end of the First Sino-Japanese War, Li sent a letter to Wu Yong, the husband of Zeng Guofan's granddaughter. Lamenting the state of the Qing military, his letter says: "All the undertakings of my life, training troops and building the navy, were merely paper tigers; how could I ever truly manage them as I wished? It was all a matter of superficial embellishment, where as long as the truth wasn't exposed, one could muddle through for the moment."

He further stated: "In my youth, I succeeded in the imperial examinations; in my prime, I engaged in military campaigns; in middle age, I governed provinces; and in my later years, I managed foreign affairs. My career path was a steady ascent, my fortunes were by no means ill-fated, and I do not believe I ever committed any grave error. Yet, how did the Sino-Japanese conflict arise to utterly ruin my life’s work? It brings to mind Ouyang Xiu's words: 'A lifetime of reputation and integrity, all caricatured and defaced by the younger generation.' Circumstances forced my hand; there was nothing to be done."

Li left a word as his self-evaluation: "To know me and judge me is a task for the next millennium" (知我罪我, 付之千載).

Li was regarded favourably in the United States, owing to his reputation for welcoming foreign influence and his 1896 visit to the country. He was wrongly credited with inventing the American Chinese dish chop suey during the visit. In 1913, William Francis Mannix wrote and published a fabricated Memoirs of Li Hung Chang which received widespread praise before being exposed as a forgery in 1923.

His biographer William J. Hail argued that Li "did perhaps all he could for a land where the conservatism of the people, a reactionary officialdom, and unrestrained international rivalry made each step forward a matter of great difficulty," and praised him as "always progressive, yet patient and conciliatory, it was his fate to bear blame for failures which might have been avoided if he had had his way." The leader of China's New Culture Movement, Hu Shih, was also sympathetic, remarking that if Li had been allowed the opportunity, his achievements for China might have equalled the achievements of his Japanese counterpart, Itō Hirobumi, at the 1895 Treaty of Shimonoseki.

Chinese nationalists criticised Li's relations with the Western powers and Japan. Liang Qichao's 1902 biography of Li blamed him for China's woes and set the tone for further castigation. In Liang's view, Li was the chief culprit for the Self-Strengthening Movement, which these nationalists condemned for collaborating with the European imperialists and suppressing the masses. Liang Qichao's son, Liang Sicheng, denounced Li in 1951 for "selling out" the country. History textbooks in the People's Republic of China labelled Li as a "feudalist" and a traitor to the Chinese people. It was not until the 1980s that mainland historians began a serious debate of the sort which had been taking place in Taiwan.

=== Bribery controversy ===
Sergei Witte dismissed some rumours during Li's visit to Europe that Li was bribed. However, according to the Russian account, Li had urged the Russian government to build a three-million rubles "Li Hongzhang Foundation" to make Li and Zhang Yinheng to support the Sino-Russia railway treaty and Lushun-Dalian Rent Treaty, and a payment of 0.5 million rubles was confirmed. Ma Wenzhong questioned whether the Russian account was reliable.

== Works ==
- Trade Charter Precedents Collection (通商約章成案彙編 1886)

The Memoirs of Li Hung Chang is a forgery that was wrongly attributed to him.

== Cultural references ==
- The Filipino novel Revolution: 80 Days (2022) featured Li as a friend of the protagonist Richard Haze.

== See also ==
- Battle of Shanghai (1861)
- Beiyang Army
- Military history of China (pre-1911)
- Self-Strengthening Movement
- Tune of Li Zhongtang

== Notes ==
Political offices
Preceded by Zeng Guofan	Acting Viceroy of Liangjiang; 1865–1866	Succeeded by Zeng Guofan
Preceded by Guanwen	Viceroy of Huguang; 1867–1870	Succeeded by Li Hanzhang
Preceded by Zeng Guofan	Viceroy of Zhili and Beiyang Trade Minister (1st time); 1871–1895	Succeeded by Wang Wenzhao
Preceded by Tan Zhonglin	Viceroy of Liangguang; 1899─1900	Succeeded by Tao Mo
Preceded by Yulu	Viceroy of Zhili and Beiyang Trade Minister (2nd time); 1900–1901	Succeeded by Yuan Shikai
