= Ralph Paine Jr. =

American journalist

Ralph "Del" Delahaye Paine Jr. (March 31, 1906 – January 12, 1991) was an American editor and publisher.

Born in Newark, New Jersey, Paine was the son of author and journalist Ralph Delahaye Paine. Paine had two younger twin brothers, Stuart Douglas Paine, who became an Antarctic explorer, and Philbrook Ten Eyck Paine, born 1910. Paine attended Yale University, where he was a member of Skull and Bones, and graduated in 1929.

After college, Paine was a Wall Street securities analyst for Edward B. Smith & Co. He became a business editor for Time magazine in 1933. Following complaints about the content of Time from businesses during the Great Depression, he was offered the choice between a firing and a promotion provided a suitable replacement could be found. Paine lamented "I'm about to be fired unless I can find someone who can satisfy Time's advertisers without catering to them." Through Yale law professor William O. Douglas, he found that replacement, Eliot Janeway.

In 1938, he became personal assistant to publisher Henry Luce, the co-founder of Time. During World War II, he was in charge of The March of Time newsreel series and European operations of Time, Inc. publications. When the Nazis invaded France, Paine and other Time, Inc. staffers were forced to flee. He was later a war correspondent in the Pacific.

Paine served as managing editor of Fortune from 1941 to 1953 and, following the departure of Charles Douglas Jackson, publisher from 1953 to 1967. During his tenure, the magazine created its famous Fortune 500 list. Paine clashed with Luce and threatened to resign over Luce's desire to make Fortune more overtly pro-business and create an advisory board for the magazine composed of prominent businessmen. Paine also served as publisher of Architectural Forum from 1954 to 1963 and House and Home from 1962 to 1963.

In 1947, Paine married Nancy White, at the time associate fashion editor of Good Housekeeping and later editor of Harper's Bazaar. It was the second marriage for both of them and it later ended in divorce.

At the time of his death, Paine was president and treasurer of the Vermont real estate holdings company Barton Mountain Corporation.
