= Earnshaw Books =

Hong Kong publishing house

- Status: Active
- Founded: 2007
- Founder: Graham Earnshaw
- Country of origin: Hong Kong S.A.R.
- Headquarters location: Central, Hong Kong
- Distribution: Hong Kong, Mainland China, Southeast Asia, Malaysia, North America, Europe, United Kingdom
- Publication types: Books
- Fiction genres: Asian History, Biography and Memoirs, Historical Fiction, Non-fiction, Fiction, Reprints
- Official website: www.earnshawbooks.com

Earnshaw Books is a Hong Kong–based publishing house specializing in English-language books about China and is considered to be "one of the more notable independent publishers in East Asia". Earnshaw Books was founded in 2007 by CEO Graham Earnshaw. First concentrating in reprinting old Chinese classics, Earnshaw Books has expanded to include original works covering topics on Chinese history and contemporary culture.

== History ==
In 1996, Graham Earnshaw developed the Tales of Old China website as an information portal about Chinese culture and history. He established Earnshaw Books in 2007 to bring Chinese and Asia interest books to English speakers, hoping to foster cross-cultural dialogue with China and the global community. In the time since, Earnshaw Books has published more than 150 titles which are currently distributed around the world.

In May 2011, the company entered the North American market with distribution partner Independent Publishers Group (IPG)/River North Editions.

The company released Décadence Mandchoue in April 2011. This is an autobiographical memoir of Sir Edmund Backhouse and contains controversial material covering Backhouse's life in China.
