= John Otway Percy Bland =

British writer and journalist (1863–1945)

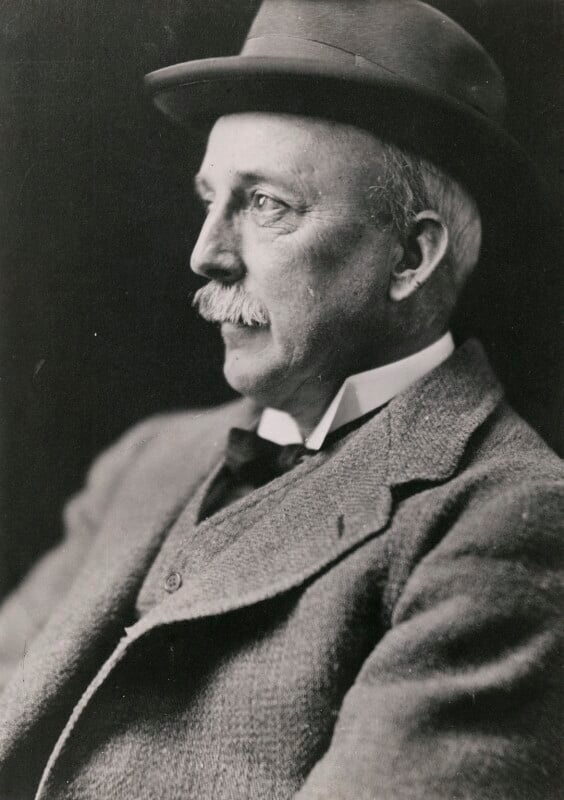
Bland in the 1920s

John Otway Percy Bland (15 November 1863, Malta – 23 June 1945, Ipswich), who wrote as J. O. P. Bland, was a British writer and journalist, best known as the author of a number of books on Chinese politics and history. He lived in China for most of the period 1883–1910.

== Family and early life ==
Bland was born on 15 November 1863 in Malta, the second son of the ten children of Major-General Edward Loftus Bland (1829–1923) and Emma Frances Franks (d. 1894).

He was educated at Victoria College, Jersey and Trinity College Dublin.

A planned career in law was curtailed while he was still at university, and his father arranged for him to be considered for an appointment in the Chinese Maritime Customs Service.

== Career in China ==
Bland arrived in China in 1883, and worked in the Customs from 1 July 1883 until 31 January 1896, serving in Hankou, Canton, and Peking, serving there as Inspector-General Sir Robert Hart's Private Secretary from 1894 to 1896. From early in his career he began writing light verse about life amongst the foreign expatriate communities in the Chinese treaty ports, collected in Lays of Far Cathay, in 1890. He married an American, Louisa Dearborn Nickels (b. c.1864), widow of M. C. Nickels and daughter of a Pacific Mail Line skipper, Captain H. C. Dearborn, in Shanghai on 29 November 1889.

In 1896 Bland resigned from the Customs to take up the position of Assistant Secretary to the Shanghai Municipal Council, which governed the Shanghai International Settlement, succeeding to the Secretaryship the following year on the retirement of the incumbent, R.F. Thorburn. This was not initially an onerous position, and Bland began to develop a parallel career as a free-lance journalist. As a Customs employee he had been forbidden from writing to or for the press, but now, as well as starting a humorous weekly, The Rattle, he penned more light verse, and commenced an association with The Times as its Shanghai correspondent. Verse and Worse was published in 1902 with illustrations by Willard Dickerman Straight, who had joined the Customs in 1902, and with whom Bland struck up a friendship.

Bland began to get critically engaged in the politics of Britain's China policy, and was a vocal advocate of a forward policy, especially with the arrival on the scene in China of German interests after 1897. At Shanghai during his tenure of his post as chief administrator, the International Settlement expanded in size threefold, and Bland himself was active in the Shanghai Committee of the British China Association, which advocated a more aggressive policy in China than its parent committee in London. He left the Municipal Council in 1906 to take up a new position with the British and Chinese Corporation (BCC), formed largely by Jardine Matheson and by the Hongkong and Shanghai Banking Corporation in 1898, becoming its Peking-based agent conducting railway loan negotiations with the Chinese government. This ended in acrimony in 1910 as Bland's anti-German proclivities ran counter to the Bank's policy, and he was dismissed. The following year saw the termination of his relationship with The Times. Since his move back to Peking Bland had assisted the paper's China correspondent George Ernest Morrison, who had no Chinese. Morrison eventually saw Bland as a rival and engineered his dismissal.

== Return to Britain ==
Bland returned to China just once more in 1920 before his death, but the years after he left were those which saw him carve out a new career as a freelance writer and commentator, mainly on Chinese affairs. As well as a succession of commentaries, Recent Events and Present Policies in China (1912); China, Japan and Korea (1921), he published more light fiction.

=== Collaboration with Backhouse ===
He became best known, however, as co-author, with Sir Edmund Backhouse, of two best-selling accounts of recent Chinese history, China under the Empress Dowager (1910) and Annals and Memoirs of the Court of Peking (1914). Backhouse, already widely known as a Sinologist, supplied the source materials for the volumes, while Bland, who had some talent as a writer, fashioned them into readable manuscripts. These books were highly influential in shaping Western opinion about the Manchu Qing dynasty and Cixi, the late Empress Dowager.

Unfortunately for Bland, Backhouse was a fantasist and forger, and attacks on the veracity of the key source used in China under the Empress Dowager, the so-called 'Diary of His Excellency Ching-Shan', commenced even before it was published. To the end of his life Bland parried attacks on the books. British historian Hugh Trevor-Roper's 1978 biography clearly laid out the lifelong pattern of fraud, forgery and deceit that had mostly engaged Backhouse's energy.

=== Views on post-imperial China ===
Bland's reputation has been further tarnished by his furious denunciation of China's nationalist revolution, China: the Pity of it (1932). Its attacks on post-imperial China, on its new nationalist aspirations and politics have seen Bland roundly identified as the quintessential 'Old China Hand', and a reactionary, if not a racist; according to Hugh Trevor-Roper, however, in his biography of Sir Edmund Backhouse, Bland's opposition to Chinese nationalist movements was based upon his belief that these movements were essentially unrealistic westernised elites attempting to impose a corrupt version of a foreign style of government on a China that was unprepared for such radical change. Trevor-Roper maintains that Bland believed China would only restore its independence with a renewal of its own traditions and institutions in some form of monarchy supported by the peasantry, which Roper suggests ultimately became a reality in the form of Mao Zedong's communist "Empire". Bland was equally critical of British policy and British diplomats, attacking the 'Foreign Office School of Thought' in his reportage, and making fun of diplomatic life and loves in Peking in his lighter fiction.

Bland died on 23 June 1945 in Ipswich, Suffolk, England. His papers were later donated to the Thomas Fisher Rare Book Library, University of Toronto through the intercession of J.L. Cranmer-Byng.

== Books ==
- Lays of Far Cathay (1890).
- Verse and Worse (1902).
- China under the Empress Dowager (1910) (with Edmund Backhouse).
  - BLAND, J.O.P.; BACKHOUSE, E. (1910). CHINA UNDER THE EMPRESS DOWAGER.
  - China Under the Empress Dowager: Being the History of the Life and Times of Tzŭ Hsi. Compiled by John Otway Percy Bland, Sir Edmund Backhouse. J.B. Lippincott. 1911.
  - LAND, J.O.P.; BACKHOUSE, E. (1910). CHINA UNDER THE EMPRESS DOWAGER.
- Recent Events and Present Policies in China (1912).
- Annals and Memoirs of the Court of Peking (1914) (with Edmund Backhouse).
  - Backhouse, Sir Edmund; Bland, John Otway Percy (1914). Annals & memoirs of the court of Peking: (from the 16th to the 20th century). W. Heinemann.
  - Backhouse, Sir Edmund; Bland, John Otway Percy (1914). Annals & memoirs of the court of Peking: (from the 16th to the 20th century). W. Heinemann.
- Houseboat days in China (1914).
- Germany's violations of the laws of war 1914–15 (1915) compiled under the auspices of the French Ministry of Foreign Affairs; tr. and with an introduction by J.O.P. Bland.
- Li Hung-chang (1917).
- Men, manners & morals in South America (1920).
- China, Japan and Korea (1921).
- Something Lighter (1924).
- China: the Pity of it (1932).

== See also ==
- Britons in China

== Bibliography ==
- Dictionary of National Biography article by Robert Bickers, 'Backhouse, Sir Edmund Trelawny, second baronet (1873–1944)' 2004 , accessed 2 January 2009
- Dictionary of National Biography article by Robert Bickers, 'Bland, John Otway Percy (1863–1945), writer and journalist', 2004 , accessed 2 January 2009
- J.J.L. Duyvendak, 'Ching-Shan's Diary a Mystification' T'oung Pao, Volume 33, Numbers 1–5, 1937, pp. 268–294
- Lo, Hui-min, 'The Ching-Shan Diary: A Clue to its Forgery', East Asian History 1 (1991), pp. 98–124
- Lo, Hui-min, The Tradition and Prototypes of the China-Watcher (Thirty-seventh G.E. Morrison Lecture:) 1976, ISBN 0-909596-32-8.
- Trevor-Roper, Hugh (1978). Hermit of Peking: : the hidden life of Sir Edmund Backhouse.
