= Sir Edmund Backhouse, 2nd Baronet =

British oriental scholar, linguist, and confidence man (1873–1944)

Backhouse in 1943

Sir Edmund Trelawny Backhouse, 2nd Baronet (20 October 1873 – 8 January 1944) was a British oriental scholar, Sinologist, and linguist whose books exerted a powerful influence on the Western view of the last decades of the Qing dynasty (1644–1912). Since his death, however, it has been established that the major source of his China Under the Empress Dowager, Diary of His Excellency Ching Shan, is a forgery, most likely by Backhouse himself.

His biographer, Hugh Trevor-Roper, unmasked Backhouse as "a confidence man with few equals", who had also duped the British government, Oxford University, the American Bank Note Company and John Brown & Company. Derek Sandhaus, the editor of Backhouse's memoirs Décadence Mandchoue, argues that they are also an undoubted confabulation but contain plausible recollections of scenes and details.

== Early life ==
Backhouse was born into a Quaker family in Darlington; his relatives included many churchmen and scholars. In 1918, he inherited the family baronetcy from his father, Sir Jonathan Backhouse, 1st Baronet, a director of Barclays Bank. His youngest brother was Sir Roger Backhouse, who was First Sea Lord from 1938 to 1939. Backhouse told The Literary Digest: "My name is pronounced back'us".

When reflecting on his childhood he wrote that "I was born of wealthy parents who had everything they wanted and were miserable ... I heard not a kind word nor received a grudging dole of sympathy". Backhouse attended Winchester College and Merton College, Oxford. While at Oxford he suffered a nervous breakdown in 1894, and although he returned to the university in 1895, he never completed his degree, instead fleeing the country due to the massive debts he had accumulated. Paul Theroux of The New York Times wrote that Backhouse had left Oxford "under a fairly thunderous cloud."

== China ==
In 1899, he arrived in Beijing where he soon began collaborating with the influential Times correspondent George Ernest Morrison, translating works from Chinese to English, as Morrison could not read or speak Chinese. Backhouse fed Morrison what he said was insider information about the Manchu court, but there is no evidence of him having any significant ties with anyone of prominence. At this time, he had already learned several languages, including Russian, Japanese and Chinese. He spent most of the rest of his life in Beijing (known at times in his life as Beiping), in the employment of various companies and individuals, who made use of his language skills and alleged connections to the Chinese imperial court for the negotiation of business deals. None of these deals were ever successful.

In 1910, he published a history, China Under the Empress Dowager and in 1914, Annals and Memoirs of the Court of Peking, both with British journalist J. O. P. Bland. With these books he established his reputation as an oriental scholar. In 1913, Backhouse began to donate a great many Chinese manuscripts to the Bodleian Library, hoping to receive a professorship in return. This endeavour was ultimately unsuccessful. He delivered a total of eight tons of manuscripts to the Bodleian between 1913 and 1923. The provenance of several of the manuscripts was later cast into serious doubt. Nevertheless, he donated over 17,000 items, some of which "were a real treasure", including half a dozen volumes of the rare Yongle Encyclopedia of the early 15th century. The Library describes the gift: "The acquisition of the Backhouse collection, one of the finest and most generous gifts in the Library's history, between 1913 and 1922, greatly enriched the Bodleian's Chinese collections."

He also worked as a secret agent for the British legation during the First World War, managing an arms deal between Chinese sources and the UK. In 1916 he presented himself as a representative of the Imperial Court and negotiated two fraudulent deals with the American Bank Note Company and John Brown & Company, a British shipbuilder. Neither company received any confirmation from the court. When they tried to contact Backhouse, he had left the country. After he returned to Peking in 1922 he refused to speak about the deals.

Backhouse's life was led in alternate periods of total reclusion and alienation from his Western origins, and work for Western companies and governments. In 1939, the Austrian Embassy offered him refuge, and he made the acquaintance of the Swiss consul, Richard Hoeppli, whom he impressed with tales of his sexual adventures and homosexual life in old Beijing. Hoeppli persuaded him to write his memoirs, which were consulted by Trevor-Roper. Décadence Mandchoue was not published until 2011 by Earnshaw Books, while the memoir dealing with his early life in Europe The Dead Past was finally published in 2017 by Alchemie Books.

Beijing, during that period of World War II, was occupied by Imperial Japan, with whom Britain was at war from 1941. By that time, Backhouse's political views were fascist, and he became a Japanese collaborator who wished fervently for an Axis victory that would destroy Great Britain. Backhouse died in the Hospital St Michel in Beijing in 1944 aged 70, unmarried, and was succeeded in the baronetcy by his nephew John Edmund Backhouse, son of Roger Backhouse. He had converted to Roman Catholicism in 1942 and was buried at Chala Catholic Cemetery near Pingzemen. Despite his loyalties, he was commemorated by the Commonwealth War Graves Commission among its list of British civilian war dead in China.

== Forgery accusations ==
Joyce Lau of The New York Times wrote that, when Backhouse was active, "there was little information about China available in the West" and that people reading his content could not easily check his statements; additionally, Backhouse knew that Westerners had a preconceived notion of China being "an exotic, and erotic, fantasy world of empresses and opium smoke" and wanted content portraying such a world.

Two major accusations of this type have been levelled against Backhouse. His claim that much of his China Under the Empress Dowager was based on Diary of His Excellency Ching Shan, the putative diary of the high court official Jingshan (景善; pinyin: Jǐngshàn, Wade-Giles: Ching3-shan4), which Backhouse claimed to have found in the house of its recently deceased author when he occupied it after the Boxer Uprising of 1900, is contested.

The authenticity of the diary has been questioned by scholars, notably Morrison, but initially defended by J. J. L. Duyvendak in 1924, who studied the matter further and changed his mind in 1940.

In 1977, Oliver Edmund Clubb stated that several academic journal authors had proved that the Ching-shan Journal was not authentic back in 1930s, but that the conclusion was not yet widespread as their publications were "esoteric".

In 1991, Lo Hui-min published an article in which the author argued would "prove the Diary's forgery beyond doubt".

In 1973 the British historian Hugh Trevor-Roper received the manuscript of Backhouse's memoirs, in which Backhouse boasted of having had affairs with prominent people, including Lord Rosebery, Paul Verlaine, an Ottoman princess, Oscar Wilde, and especially the Empress Dowager Cixi of China. Backhouse also claimed to have visited Leo Tolstoy and acted opposite Sarah Bernhardt. Trevor-Roper described the diary as "pornographic", considered its claims, and eventually declared its contents to be figments of Backhouse's fertile imagination. Theroux stated that Trevor-Roper's book proved that Backhouse had fabricated material and had a lack of candor when discussing it. Albert G. Hess stated that Trevor-Roper had "prove[d] conclusively" that the Ching-shan diary was made by Backhouse and was not real.

Robert Bickers, in the Oxford Dictionary of National Biography, calls Backhouse a "fraudster", and declares that he "may indeed in his memoirs have been the chronicler of, for example, male brothel life in late-imperial Peking, and there may be many small truths in those manuscripts that fill out the picture of his life, but we know now that not a word he ever said or wrote can be trusted."

Derek Sandhaus, who published Manchurian Decadence, stated "While there may be some inconsistencies, it is fundamentally based on fact" and that "this book may have been a way for him to relay things he had heard." Sandhouse notes that Trevor-Roper did not consult specialists in Chinese affairs, and seems to have read only enough of the text to have been disgusted by its homosexuality. While conceding that Backhouse fabricated or imagined many of the purported assignations, others Sandhaus independently confirmed or found plausible, reasoning that Backhouse spoke Chinese, Manchu, and Mongolian (the languages of the imperial household), and that his account of the atmosphere and customs of the Empress Dowager's court may be more reliable than Trevor-Roper allowed. Kent Ewing, in Asia Times, described the accounts as "interesting and amusing" even though "their worth may be highly uncertain".

== Works ==
- Backhouse, Edmund; Bland, J. O. P. (1910). China Under the Empress Dowager: Being the History of the Life and Times of Tzŭ Hsi. China under the empress dowager
- Backhouse, Edmund; Bland, John Otway Percy (1914). Annals & memoirs of the court of Peking: (from the 16th to the 20th century) (PDF). London: Heinemann. Archived from the original on 28 June 2014.
- Backhouse, Sir Edmund; Bland, J. O. P. (1913). "Secret Annals of the Manchu Court 1. The Story of the Precious Pearl". The Atlantic, Volume 112. Atlantic Monthly Co. p. 629.
- Backhouse, Sir Edmund (2011). Décadence Mandchoue. Hong Kong: Earnshaw Books. ISBN 978-9881944511.
- Backhouse, Edmund Trelawny (2022) [1945]. Hoeppli, Reinhard (ed.). The Dead Past. Sydney: Alchemie Books. ISBN 978-0645852714.

== See also ==
- Britons in China
- William Francis Mannix

== Notes ==
Baronetage of the United Kingdom
Preceded by Jonathan Edmund Backhouse	Baronet (of Uplands, County Durham); 1918–1944	Succeeded by John Backhouse
