= Ralph Delahaye Paine =

American politician

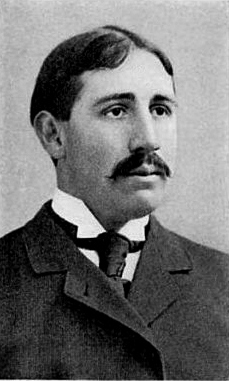

Member of the New Hampshire House of Representatives
- In office 1918–1920

Personal details
- Born: Ralph Delahaye Paine; August 28, 1871 Lemont, Illinois, U.S.
- Died: April 29, 1925 (aged 53) Concord, New Hampshire, U.S.
- Party: Democratic
- Education: Yale University

Ralph Delahaye Paine (August 28, 1871 – April 29, 1925) was an American journalist and author popular in the early 20th century. Later, he held both elected and appointed government offices.

== Life and career ==
Born in Lemont, Illinois, Paine was the son of Reverend Samuel Delahaye Paine. Rev. Paine was born in London and served in the British Army during the Crimean War before emigrating to America in 1856. Rev. Paine served as a lieutenant in the 2nd Maine Battery during the American Civil War and later was chaplain-in-chief of the Grand Army of the Republic.

While his father was pastor of the Ocean Street Presbyterian Church in Jacksonville, Florida, Paine worked as a reporter for twelve dollars a week. He also frequented a soda fountain in a cigar shop owned by Cuban revolutionary José Alejandro Huau.

Paine attended Hillhouse High School in New Haven, Connecticut and then Yale University. At Yale he was on the football and rowing teams and was a member of Skull and Bones. At Yale, he covered athletic news for a news syndicate. This, plus the money he saved reporting in Jacksonville, paid for his education. He graduated in 1894.

After graduating, Paine worked for the Philadelphia Press until 1901. Paine's connection to Huau came to the attention of newspaperman William Randolph Hearst when American newspapers were publishing frenzied coverage of the Cuban War of Independence. Hearst's New York Journal had held a contest to determine the "world's greatest living soldier", and Cuban revolutionary military commander Máximo Gómez was the winner. The prize was a gold-plated and diamond-encrusted sword inscribed "Viva Cuba Libre" and "To Máximo Gómez, Commander-in-Chief of the Army of the Republic of Cuba". Hearst needed someone to deliver the sword to Gomez and offered Paine the task. Paine replied "I am the damn fool you have been looking for."

Huau got Paine and another reporter, Ernest McCready, on a boat smuggling munitions and soldiers to Cuba, the Three Friends under Captain "Dynamite" Johnny O'Brien. The Three Friends got into a skirmish with a Spanish gunboat and, in the only naval battle of the war, inexplicably triumphed. However, since the US was not participating in the war, O'Brien, fearing legal entanglements and seizure of his vessel, fled and left passengers and cargo on No Name Key. After filing his story in Key West, Paine managed to get on board the Dauntless, which came to retrieve the cargo under the supervision of General Emilio Núñez. He let Paine and McCready on board, but Núñez, annoyed by a delay they had caused, refused to let them off at Corrientes Bay and returned them to Jacksonville. Upon his return, he discovered that he was among those indicted for piracy (a capital crime) in the Three Friends incident. With the assistance of his father, Paine went into hiding for a month. However, one of the co-owners of the boat was powerful sheriff and future Governor of Florida Napoleon Broward. Thanks to his influence, no witnesses could identify any participants in the affair and the case was dropped. Paine gave the sword to José Huau, who had it delivered to Gómez's wife in Santo Domingo, and returned to his job at the Philadelphia Press.

The Spanish–American War soon broke out, and Paine was aboard the USS New York, the flagship of Admiral William T. Sampson, when it bombed Matanzas. Paine was also among a group of reporters on board the Gussie, an officially sponsored supply vessel whose captain's extremely poor choice of landing spots resulted in two failed attempts to deliver cargo to Cuban rebels. They came under fire in what was exaggeratedly called the "Battle of Cabañas" by one newspaper and inspiration for a "comic opera" by another.

In 1900, he covered the Boxer Rebellion and was with forces of the Eight-Nation Alliance in Tientsin and Peking. In 1902, he joined the New York Herald and ran a successful campaign against the beef trust, then became managing editor of the New York Telegraph. In 1903, he left journalism and became a prolific writer of history and fiction, writing about topics including Salem, Massachusetts, piracy, merchant shipping, naval vessels, college life, sports, and autobiography. He contributed to numerous publications, including Collier's Weekly, Journal des débats, Le Figaro, L'Écho de Paris, The Century Magazine, Scribner's Magazine, McClure's, Outing, Cosmopolitan, Everybody's Magazine, The American Magazine, The World's Work, Collier's Weekly, The Youth's Companion, Munsey's Magazine, Saturday Evening Post, The Popular Magazine, The American Boy, Ainslee's Magazine, St. Nicholas Magazine, and Country Life in America.

In 1903, he married Katharine Lansing Morse. They had three sons; Ralph Delahaye Paine, Jr. (1906–1991), editor and publisher of Fortune, and the twins Stuart Douglas Paine, who became an Antarctic explorer, and Philbrook Ten Eyck Paine, born 1910.

In 1908, he moved to Shankhassick Farm in Durham, New Hampshire. From 1918 to 1920 he represented Durham in the New Hampshire House of Representatives and from 1919 to 1921 served on the New Hampshire Board of Education.

During World War I, he worked for the Committee on Public Information and the United States Department of the Navy, observing and writing about Allied naval forces. He was also a commissioner of the United States Fuel Administration in 1918.

== Bibliography ==
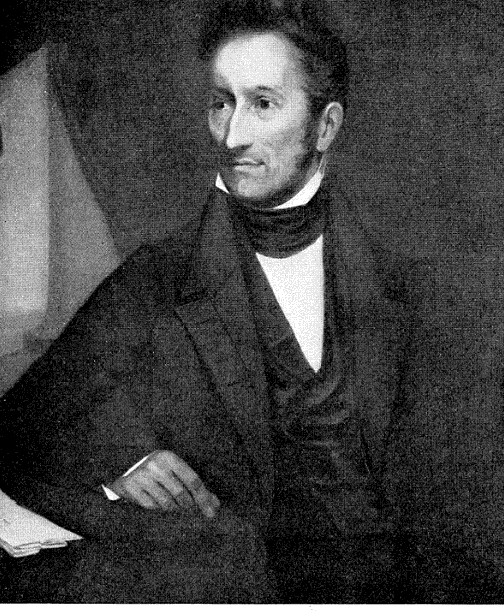
Portrait of Nathaniel Silsbee from, The Ships and Sailors of Old Salem: The Record of a Brilliant Era of American Achievement, 1912

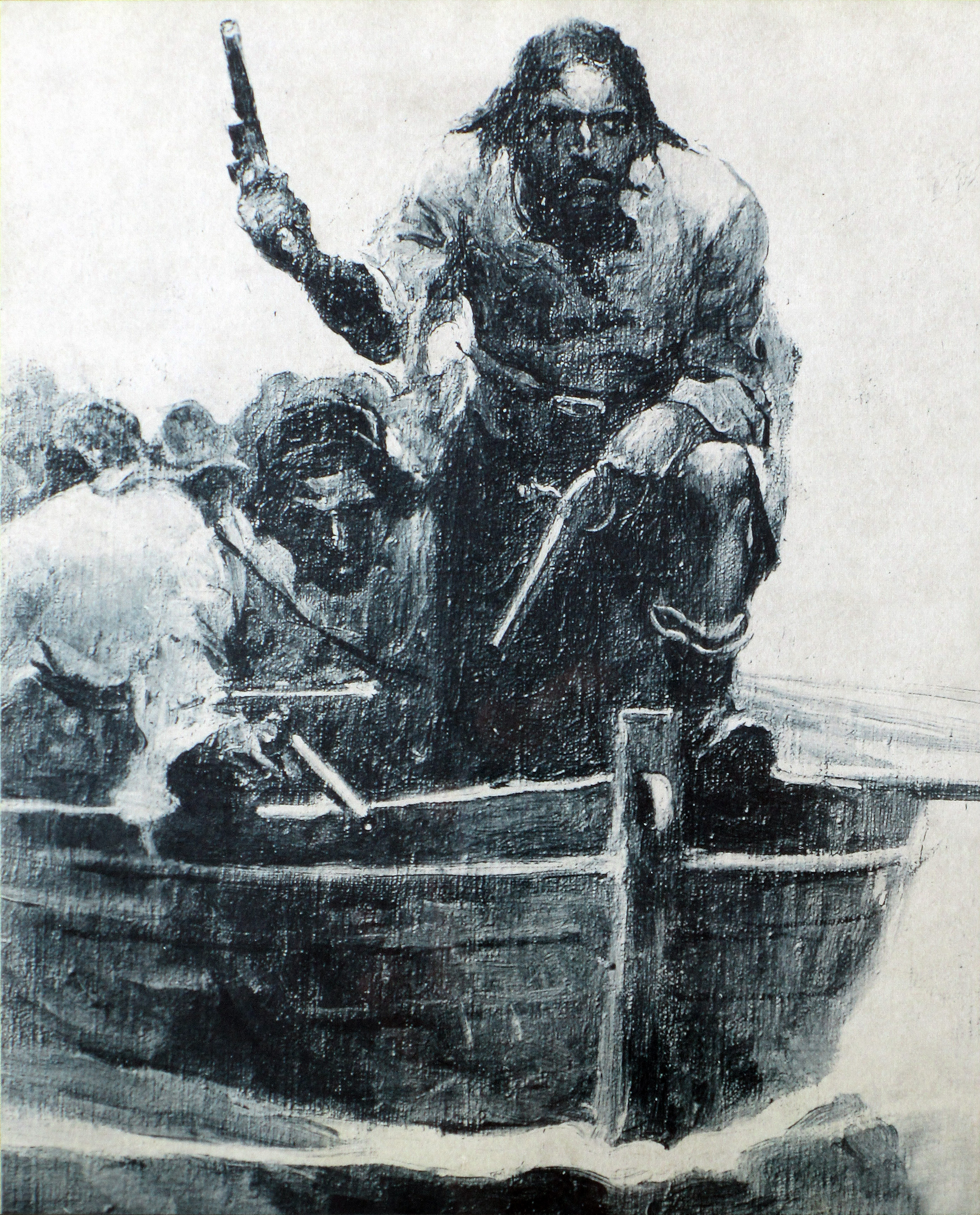
Blackbeard Approaching, Blackbeard and his crew approach in their longboats. Art commissioned for Paine's serialized work on Blackbeard

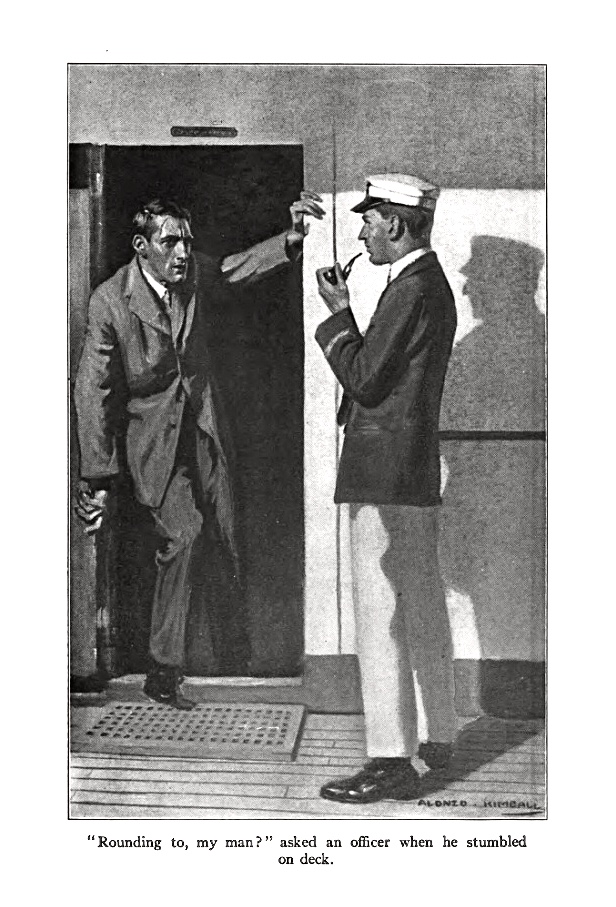
Illustration by Alonzo Kimball in Paine's The Long Road Home (1916)

- The Praying Skipper and Other Stories (1906) (translated into the French by Jacques des Gachons)
- The Story of Martin Coe (1906)
- The Romance of an Old-Time Ship Master (1907)
- J. Archibald McKackney (1907)
- The Greater America (1907, revised 2017) ISBN 978-1544938301
- The Stroke Oar (1908)
- College Years (1909)
- The Ships and Sailors of Old Salem (1909)
- The Head Coach and The Fugitive Freshman (1910)
- Sandy Sawyer, Sophomore (1911)
- The Book of Buried Treasure (1911)
- The Wrecking Master (1911)
- A Cadet of the Black Star Line (1912)
- The Dragon and the Cross (1912)
- Campus Days (1912)
- The Judgments of the Sea (1912)
- The Steam-shovel Man (1913)
- The Adventures of Captain O'Shea (1913)
- The Wall Between (1914)
- The Twisted Skein (1915)
- The Long Road Home (1916)
- Sons of Eli (1917)
- The Fighting Fleets (1918)
- American Destroyers in the War Zone (1918)
- The Call of the Off-Shore Wind (1918)
- The Fight for a Free Sea, a Chronicle of "Mr. Madison's War" (1918) (Chronicles of America)
- The Old Merchant Marine, a Chronicle of American Ships and Sailors (1919) (Chronicles of America)
- Ships Across the Sea (1920)
- The Corsair in the War Zone (1920)
- The Public School Problem in New Hampshire (1920)
- First Down, Kentucky! (1921)
- Lost Ships and Lonely Seas (1921)
- Roads of Adventure (1922) (autobiographical)
- Blackbeard-Buccaneer (1922)
- Comrades of the Rolling Ocean (1923)
- Privateers of '76 (1923)
- The introduction of the re-published version of The Memoirs of Li Hung Chang (1923)
- Four Bells and Joshua Barney, a Forgotten Hero (1924)
- In Zanzibar (1925)
- The First Yale Unit (1925)
- Elijah Cobb - A Cape Cod Skipper (1925) (Foreword written by Ralph D. Paine)
- The Golden Table
- The Careless Sophomore (one act play)
- The Troubles of Juliet (one act play)
- The Pig with the Twisted Tail (screenplay)
- Too Much Pie (screenplay)
- The Skipper's Guest (screenplay)
- American College Football (Sportsman's Library)
