= Lo Hui-min =

Historian

- 駱惠敏
- Born: May 4, 1925 (official); Shanghai, China
- Died: April 28, 2006 (aged 80)
- Occupation: Historian

Lo Hui-min
- Traditional Chinese: 駱惠敏
- Simplified Chinese: 骆惠敏
Transcriptions
Standard Mandarin
- Hanyu Pinyin: Luò Huìmǐn
- Wade–Giles: Lo4 Hui4-min3

Lo Hui-min (Chinese: 駱惠敏; pinyin: Luò Huìmǐn; 1925-2006) was a Chinese and Australian historian of the late Qing and Republican periods, best-known for his work on George Ernest Morrison and Ku Hung-ming.

Born in Shanghai, he spent his childhood near Quanzhou and his adolescence in Singapore before attending Yenching University. He completed a Ph.D. in History Cambridge University in 1953 under the supervision of Victor Purcell. He joined Australian National University in 1963, having been approached by C. P. Fitzgerald on a visit to London. He gave the George Ernest Morrison Lecture in Ethnology in 1976 and was elected a Fellow of The Australian Academy of the Humanities in 1981.

Geremie Barmé called him "a learned scholar with the best instincts of a journalist", and Wang Gungwu wrote upon Lo's death, "For his work on modern Chinese history, he demanded the highest standards of accuracy. He worried over every fact and detail, always determined to provide his reader with the most complete information possible. Thus I know that everything he has written can be relied upon and only regret that he did not write more. His herculean and efforts to edit the Morrison Diaries earned him considerable respect."

He published in The China Quarterly, East Asian, and Journal of the Oriental Society of Australia.
