= George Ernest Morrison Lecture in Ethnology =

Annual lecture held at Australian National University

The George Ernest Morrison Lecture in Ethnology is given annually at the Australian National University in honour of George Ernest Morrison. The Lectures, founded by the Chinese community in Australia "to honour for all time the great Australian who rendered valuable service to China" were also, in the words of Geremie Barmé "related to Chinese-Australian resistance to White Australia policy, reflecting also the alarm and outrage resulting from the Japanese invasion of Manchuria in 1931." Several of the older lectures were reprinted in 1996 by East Asian History.

== List of lectures ==
Lecturers have included:

=== 1930s ===
- 1932 W.P. Chen
- 1933 William Ah Ket
- 1934 James Stuart MacDonald
- 1935 W.P. Chen
- 1936 Wu Lien-teh
- 1937 Chun-jien Pao
- 1938 Aldred F. Barker
- 1939 Stephen Henry Roberts

=== 1940s ===
- 1940 Howard Mowll
- 1941 W. G. Goddard
- No lectures 1942–1947
- 1948 Douglas Copland
- 1949 J. K. Rideout

=== 1950s ===
- 1951 C. P. Fitzgerald
- 1952 H.V. Evatt
- 1953 Michael Lindsay, 2nd Baron Lindsay of Birker
- 1954 Mischa Titiev
- 1955 Hans Bielenstein
- 1956 Leonard Bell Cox
- 1957 Otto van der Sprenkel
- 1958 A. R. Davis
- 1959 Charles Nelson Spinks

=== 1960s ===
- 1960 Chen Chih-Mai
- 1961 L. Carrington Goodrich
- 1962 Göran Malmqvist
- 1963 Harry Simon (Sinologist)
- 1964 Wang Ling (historian)
- 1965 Abraham M. Halpern
- 1966 J.W. de Jong
- 1968 John Frodsham
- 1969 Arthur Huck

=== 1970s ===
- 1970 Karl August Wittfogel
- 1971 Igor de Rachewiltz
- 1972 Eugene Kamenka
- 1973 Liu Ts'un-yan
- 1974 Jerome Ch'en
- 1975 Yi-fu Tuan
- 1976 Lo Hui-min
- 1977 Roy Hofheinz
- 1978 Mark Elvin
- 1979 Wang Gungwu

=== 1980s ===
- 1980 Fang Chao-ying
- 1981 Tien Ju-K'ang
- 1982 Alan Thorne
- 1983 Chan Hok-lam
- 1984 John S. Gregory
- 1985 Allen S. Whiting
- 1986 Pierre Ryckmans (writer)
- 1987 Jean Chesneaux
- 1988 Ross Garnaut
- 1989 Stephen FitzGerald (diplomat)

=== 1990s ===
- 1990 Rafe de Crespigny
- 1992 14th Dalai Lama
- 1993 William John Francis Jenner
- 1994 Ramon Myers
- 1995 Martin King Whyte
- 1996 Geremie Barmé
- 1997 Philip Kuhn
- 1998 Donald Leslie (academic)
- 1999 T.H. Barrett

=== 2000s ===
- 2000 Frederick Teiwes
- 2001 Ezra Vogel
- 2002 Anita Chan
- 2003 Wen-hsin Yeh
- 2004 David S. G. Goodman
- 2005 John Minford
- 2006 Scott Rozelle
- 2007 Dai Qing
- 2008 Jane Macartney (journalist)
- 2009 none; two in 2010.

=== 2010s ===
- 2010 Kevin Rudd
- 2010 Børge Bakken
- 2011 Linda Jaivin
- 2012 Mark Elliott (historian)
- 2013 Michael Nylan
- 2014 Christine Wong
- 2015 David Walker (historian)
- 2016 Jonathan Unger
- 2017 Daniel Kane (linguist)
- 2018 Hamashita Takeshi
- 2019 John Makeham

=== 2020s ===
- 2020 Benjamin Elman
- 2021 none (two in 2022)
- 2022 Evelyn Goh
- 2022 Rana Mitter
- 2023 Yuri Pines
- 2024 Leigh Jenco
- 2025 none
- 2026 Terry Kleeman
