= A.R. Davis Memorial Lecture =

Annual lecture

The A.R. Davis Memorial Lecture is held annually in commemoration of A.R. Davis, the Professor of Oriental Studies at the University of Sydney and a key figure in post-war Asian Studies in Australia. It is organised by the Australian Society for Asian Humanities (formerly the Oriental Society of Australia) and published in the Journal of the Society for Asian Humanities (formerly the Journal of the Oriental Society of Australia).

== Speakers and topics ==
Speakers and topics have included:

- 1995, S.N. Mukherjee, "Orientalism and History"
- 1998, Adrian Snodgrass, "Language, Rules and Ritual: Semantics and the Indo-Japanese Fire Ceremony"
- 2000, Roland Fletcher, "Seeing Angkor, New Views of an Old City."
- 2001, Joseph Jordens, "Gandhi's Non-Violence Revisited."
- 2002, Michael G. Carter, "‘The Scholar as Dragoman"
- 2004, Alison Broinowski, "The Outbreak of Occidentalism"
- 2005, Leith Morton, "Shamans Make History in Okinawa: A reading of Oshiro Tatsuhiro's Novel Noro (Mantic Woman, 1985)
- 2006, Frits Staal, "Secrets behind Walls"
- 2007, Colin Mackerras, "China's Islamic Minorities--Contemporary Perspectives"
- 2009, Neville Meaney, "The problem of nationalism and race: Australia and Japan in World War I and World War II"
- 2010, Michael Walsh, "Voices from the north: linguistic connections between Asia and Aboriginal Australia"
- 2011, Bonnie McDougall, "Ambiguities of power: The social space of translation relationships"
- 2012, Jocelyn Chey, "Laughing down the ages: A brief history of humour in China"
- 2013, Jamila Hussain, "Reflections on Islamic thought over the ages"
- 2015, Carol Hayes, "Women writing women: 'A woman's place' in modern Japanese women's poetry"
- 2016, Sekhar Bandyopadhyay, "Caste, nation and modernity: Indian nationalism's unresolved Dilemma"
- 2017, Jon von Kowallis, "Takeuchi's Lu Xun / China's Takeuchi"
- 2018, Mabel Lee, "On the creative aesthetics of nobel laureate Gao Xingjian"
- 2019, Adrian Vickers, "From Orientalism to Inter-Asia Referencing"
- 2020, Devleena Ghosh, "The bones of our mothers": Coal, climate and resistance in a Chhattisgarh District"
- 2021, Vera Mackie, "Asia in Australia: History on the Streets"
- 2022, Barbara Hendrischke, "Daoist Plans for a Millennium of Great Peace"
- 2023, Ari Heinrich, "Contaminated Art in Contaminated Times: Jes Fan at 2020 Sydney Biennale"
- 2024, Mina Roces, "When Home is an Empty Italian Villa in the Philippines: The Semiotics of Consumption of Filipino Domestic Workers in Italy, 1980s-2018"
- 2025, Li Narangoa, "Legends in Stone and Story: The Mongol Invasions in Japan's Memoryscape"
- 2026, Jumana Bayeh, "West Asia and the “Middle West”: Asian Studies Today"

== See also ==
- George Ernest Morrison Lecture in Ethnology
- Walter Stibbs Lectures
