= East Asian History (journal) =

- Discipline: Asian history
- Language: English
- Edited by: Benjamin Penny

Publication details
- Former name: Papers on Far Eastern History
- History: 1970-present
- Publisher: Australian National University
- Frequency: Biannually
- Open access: Yes

Standard abbreviations
- ISO 4: East Asian Hist.

Indexing
- ISSN: 1839-9010
- OCLC no.: 1120263121

Links
- Journal homepage; Online archive

East Asian History is a peer-reviewed open-access academic journal published by the Australian National University. It was established in 1970 as Papers on Far Eastern History, obtaining its current title in 1991. Published by ANU's Research School of Pacific and Asian Studies, it was part of a growth in publication on Asian studies in Australia in the 1970s. Originally "founded as a forum for the publication of papers written by the faculty and students of Australian National University" affiliates of ANU continued to "represent the large majority of its contributors, although over the years there have been increasing contributions from scholars from other universities in Australia and abroad." Chinese History: A Manual included the journal as one of the main Western-language journals for research on Chinese history.

In its early years, it represented one of only a few places for work on East Asian history to be published in Australia. Igor de Rachewiltz's translations of the Secret History of the Mongols were first published in serialised form in this journal and remain its most cited contribution. The journal adopted its present title after 1990, attempting "a more imaginative design and style" and longer-form article than was becoming usual in academic articles in history. The Handbook of Reference Works in Traditional Chinese Studies in 1996 deemed it "A consistently high quality journal, whose papers confirm the strength of Chinese history at A.N.U," while the Revue Bibliographique de Sinologie noted not only the scholarly value but also the original presentation and numerous illustrations of EAH under the editorship of Geremie Barmé.

It was published in print until 2008, and continued as a peer-reviewed online journal before falling dormant after 2021. In 2007, the journal reprinted the early Morrison Lectures (1932–41), which "illuminate the nature of the relationship between Australia and China in the period before the Pacific War and the Communist victory," including those of W.P. Chen, William Ah Ket, and Wu Lien-teh, which were otherwise out of print. Editors have included Barmé (1991–2007) and the present editor Benjamin Penny. Contributors have included Rafe de Crespigny, Lo Hui-min, Mark Elvin, Liu Ts'un-yan, Charles Coppel, Pierre Ryckmans (writer) and Leo Suryadinata.
