= Australian Society for Asian Humanities =

Australian learned society

The Australian Society for Asian Humanities is the oldest academic society in Australasia dedicated to the study of Asia and to the promotion of "the knowledge of Asia in Australia by providing a meeting-place where scholars could present their work to their peers and to the community at large." Founded in 1956 by A.R. Davis as the Oriental Society of Australia, in its early years it was "open to subscribers across the country but the bulk of its members were in Sydney." In 1960, OSA hosted an address from the Republican Chinese ambassador, Chen Chih-Mai.

The focus on Sydney in the first half-century ultimately resulted in the establishment of the Asian Studies Association of Australia (1975) and the New Zealand Asian Studies Society (1974) rather than a geographic expansion of OSA membership. Acquiring its present name in 2021, the society also hosts regular seminars, the annual A.R. Davis Memorial Lecture as well as an Emerging Scholars Award.

Beginning in 1960, the society has published a scholarly journal, entitled Journal of the Oriental Society of Australia until 2019, and JOSAH: Journal of the Society for Asian Humanities from the 2020-21 issue. It is the oldest continuing Asia-focused journal in Australasia. It has also published several books, including Austrina (1982), in honour of the society's 25th anniversary. Its fiftieth anniversary was marked by a conference entitled "World without Walls" held at The Women's College, University of Sydney, opened by Chancellor Kim Santow, and featuring keynotes i.a. from Geremie Barmé, Bob Debus, and Alison Broinowski.

A.R. Davis was the founding president. Presidents have included Hermann Black (1958–60), C.P. Fitzgerald, and Michael G. Carter. The current president is Jon von Kowallis of UNSW Sydney and the editor of the journal is Adrian Vickers of the University of Sydney.
