= Jordens =

Jordens may refer to:

== First name ==
- Jordens Peters (born 1987), Dutch football executive

== Surname ==
- Albert Jordens (1902-1949), Belgian racing cyclist
- Joseph Jordens (1925-2008), Belgian indologist

== Others ==
- Jordens herrar, 2011 book by Pelle Strindlund
- Ur jordens djup, 2007 studio album by Finntroll
