= ASAH =

ASAH or Asah may refer to:

- Aneurysmal subarachnoid haemorrhage, a neurological emergency: bleeding from ruptured aneurysm
- Asah Spencer, a Native American painter
- N-acylsphingosine amidohydrolase (acid ceramidase), an enzymatic product of ASAH1, gene mutated in Farber disease
- Australian Society for Asian Humanities
