= Hongxi Emperor =

Emperor of China from 1424 to 1425

Hongxi Emperor 洪熙帝
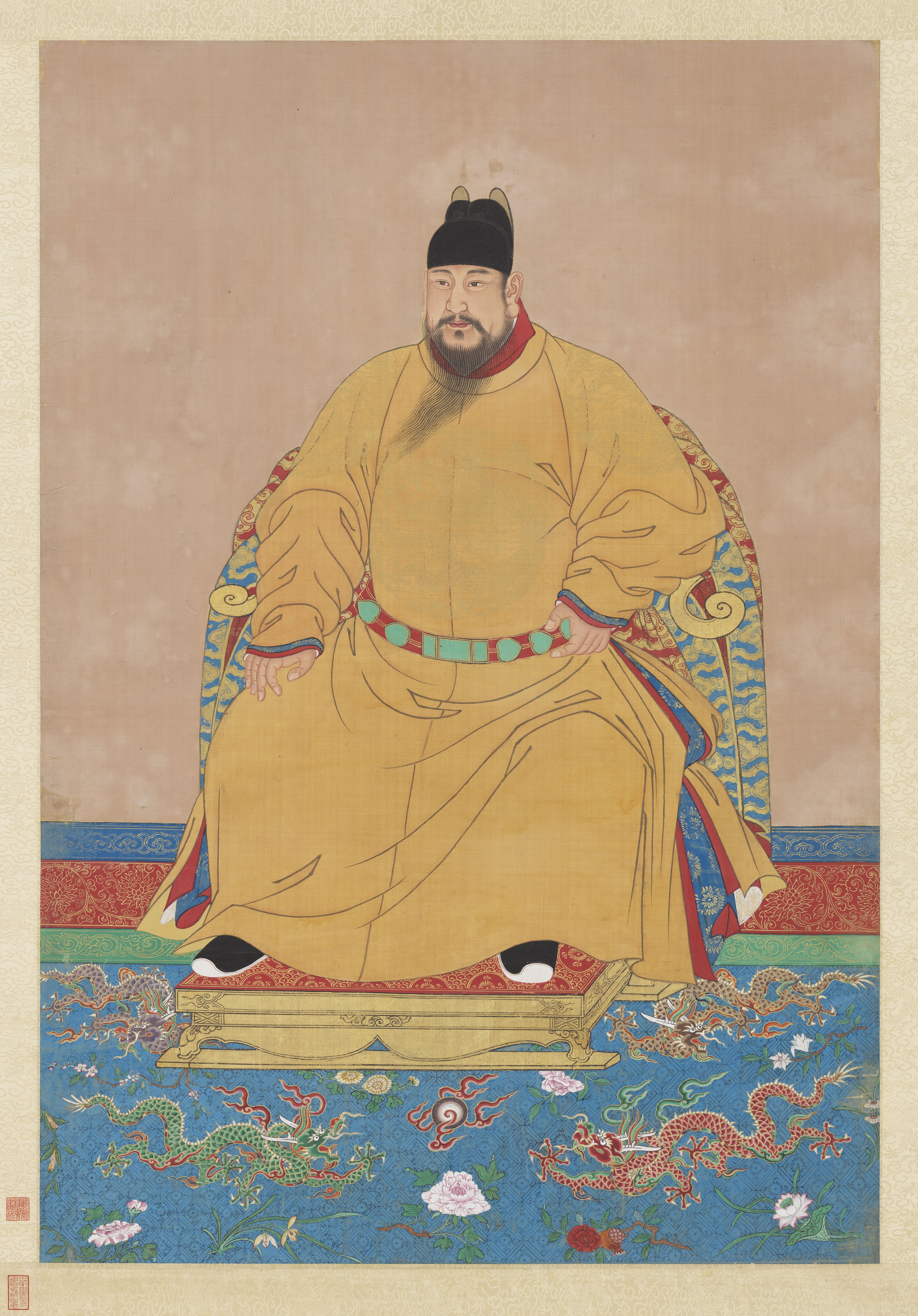
- Palace portrait on a hanging scroll

Emperor of the Ming dynasty
- Reign: 12 August 1424 – 29 May 1425
- Enthronement: 7 September 1424
- Predecessor: Yongle Emperor
- Successor: Xuande Emperor
- Born: 16 August 1378
- Died: 29 May 1425 (aged 46); Hall of Imperial Peace, Forbidden City, Beijing, Ming dynasty
- Burial: Xian Mausoleum, Ming tombs, Beijing, China
- Spouse: Empress Chengxiaozhao (m. 1396)
- Issue Detail: Xuande Emperor; Zhu Zhanjun, Prince Jing of Zheng
Era dates
- Hongxi: (Note: Chinese: 洪熙; pinyin: Hóngxī) 20 January 1425 – 7 February 1426
Posthumous name
- Emperor Jingtian Tidao Chuncheng Zhide Hongwen Qinwu Zhangsheng Daxiao Zhao (Note: Simplified Chinese: 敬天体道纯诚至德弘文钦武章圣达孝昭皇帝; traditional Chinese: 敬天體道純誠至德弘文欽武章聖達孝昭皇帝; lit. 'Respecter of Heaven, Embodiment of the Way, Pure in Sincerity, Perfect in Virtue, Extensive in Culture, Dominant in Militancy, Standard of Sageliness, Thorough in Filial Piety, Luminous Emperor' (conferred by the Xuande Emperor in 1425))
Temple name
- Renzong (Note: Chinese: 仁宗; pinyin: Rénzōng)
- House: Zhu
- Dynasty: Ming
- Father: Yongle Emperor
- Mother: Empress Xu

Chinese name
- Chinese: 洪熙帝
Transcriptions
Standard Mandarin
- Hanyu Pinyin: Hóngxī Dì
- Wade–Giles: Hung^{2}-hsi^{1} Ti^{4}
- IPA: [xʊ̌ŋ.ɕí tî]

The Hongxi Emperor (16 August 1378 – 29 May 1425), personal name Zhu Gaochi, (Note: Simplified Chinese: 朱高炽; traditional Chinese: 朱高熾; pinyin: Zhū Gāochì) was the fourth emperor of the Ming dynasty of China, reigning from 1424 to 1425. He was the eldest son of the Yongle Emperor and ascended the throne after the death of his father. His reign lasted less than a year.

As a prince, the Hongxi Emperor received a traditional Confucian education and was noted for his literary abilities. He served as regent in either Nanjing or Beijing during the Yongle Emperor's campaigns in Mongolia. After ascending the throne, he discontinued Zheng He's treasure voyages and halted the trade of tea for horses with Asian nations. He pardoned officials who had been disgraced by the previous regime and restructured the government, appointing his trusted advisors to key positions. He also strengthened the authority of the Grand Secretariat, the highest governing body. He abandoned his father's unpopular militaristic policies, reformed the financial and tax system, and encouraged the return of displaced peasants, particularly in the lower regions of the Yangtze River. His efforts to promote Confucian ideals influenced the style of governance for the next century.

The Hongxi Emperor decided to relocate the capital back to Nanjing, but died in May 1425, reportedly from a heart attack. His 26-year-old son, Zhu Zhanji, assumed the throne as the Xuande Emperor and continued his father's progressive policies, which had a lasting influence. Later historians have noted the Hongxi Emperor's adherence to Confucian ideals, and praised his attempts to address the shortcomings of the Yongle era.

== Early life ==
Zhu Gaochi, the future Hongxi Emperor, was born on 16 August 1378 during the reign of his grandfather, the Hongwu Emperor, the founder of China's Ming dynasty. His father, Zhu Di, was the Emperor's fourth son and the Prince of Yan. His mother was Zhu Di's wife, Lady Xu. Zhu Gaochi's parents had two more sons, Zhu Gaoxu in 1380 and Zhu Gaosui in 1383. Zhu Gaochi received a traditional education in both military and Confucian studies; due to his poor health, he focused mainly on reading and discussions with his tutors. He was uninterested in military matters but skilled in archery. He surrounded himself with scholars such as Yang Shiqi, Yang Rong, Yang Pu, and Huang Huai. Zhu Gaochi's literary and administrative abilities impressed the Hongwu Emperor, but Zhu Di favored his younger sons due to their interest in military pursuits.

After the Hongwu Emperor died in 1398, Zhu Di launched a civil war against his nephew, the newly ascended Jianwen Emperor. The conflict, known as the Jingnan campaign, ended with Zhu Di ascending the throne as the Yongle Emperor in 1402. While his father and younger brothers engaged in the war, Zhu Gaochi managed his father's territory. In late 1399, during the siege of Beijing, Zhu Gaochi successfully defended his father's princely fief with about 10,000 soldiers against the larger imperial forces led by the general Li Jinglong. Zhu Di recognized his eldest son's role in the defense of Beijing but continued to favor his younger sons.

In May 1404, at the urging of the grand secretaries Xie Jin and Huang Huai, the Yongle Emperor designated Zhu Gaochi as heir apparent. During the Yongle Emperor's campaigns in Mongolia, Zhu Gaochi governed the empire as regent in his father's absence and became alienated from his father's policies. He also faced hostility from his brothers. In September 1414, when their father returned from Mongolia, Zhu Gaochi was accused by his brother Zhu Gaoxu of neglecting his duties. The Emperor then imprisoned two of Zhu Gaochi's closest advisors, Yang Pu and Huang Huai. Zhu Gaoxu's exile to Shandong in 1417 removed him as a direct threat to Zhu Gaochi, but the Emperor's relationship with his heir remained strained.

Simplified family tree of the early Ming emperors

Hongwu Emperor r. 1368–1398	Empress Ma
Zhu Biao (Heir Apparent)	Yongle Emperor r. 1402–1424	Empress Xu
Jianwen Emperor r. 1398–1402	Hongxi Emperor r. 1424–1425	Empress Zhang	Zhu Gaoxu (Prince of Han)	Zhu Gaosui (Prince of Zhao)
Xuande Emperor r. 1425–1435

== Ascension ==
The Yongle Emperor died on 12 August 1424, while returning from his fifth Mongol campaign. Zhu Gaochi officially became emperor on 7 September 1424, and adopted the era name Hongxi, which means "vastly bright". A few days before, he had secured the safety of the capital and sent Wang Jinghong, the senior eunuch, to Nanjing as grand defender. (Note: Simplified Chinese: 南京守备; traditional Chinese: 南京守備; lit. 'Grand commandant of Nanjing', rank 4a) He also released the ministers Xia Yuanji and Wu Zhong (吳中), who had been imprisoned since 1421 and resumed their ministerial positions on 8 September.

The Hongxi Emperor reorganized the Grand Secretariat two days after his enthronement, appointing Huang Huai and Yang Pu as grand secretaries. Both had been imprisoned by the Yongle Emperor since 1414. The Emperor promoted Yang Shiqi to senior grand secretary, retaining Yang Rong and Jin Youzi (金幼孜) in their positions as grand secretaries. The Emperor gave the grand secretaries the rank of vice ministers, elevating their formal status to match their actual influence. Later, they were awarded first-rank status and given extra ministerial titles—Yang Shiqi became minister of war, Yang Rong minister of works, and Huang Huai minister of revenue—which enabled them to participate directly in government affairs. The Emperor collaborated with the grand secretaries and ministers, encouraging open discussion during meetings. They reached decisions through collective deliberation, which led to the cancellation of the Yongle Emperor's unpopular policies.

On 29 October, the Emperor appointed his wife, Lady Zhang, as empress. Three days later, he designated his eldest son, Zhu Zhanji, as heir to the throne and granted princely titles to his other sons. He also raised the incomes of members of the imperial family, but maintained their exclusion from involvement in state affairs. The Emperor's rebellious brother, Zhu Gaoxu, benefited from the increased income, and his sons received titles.

== Domestic and foreign policy ==
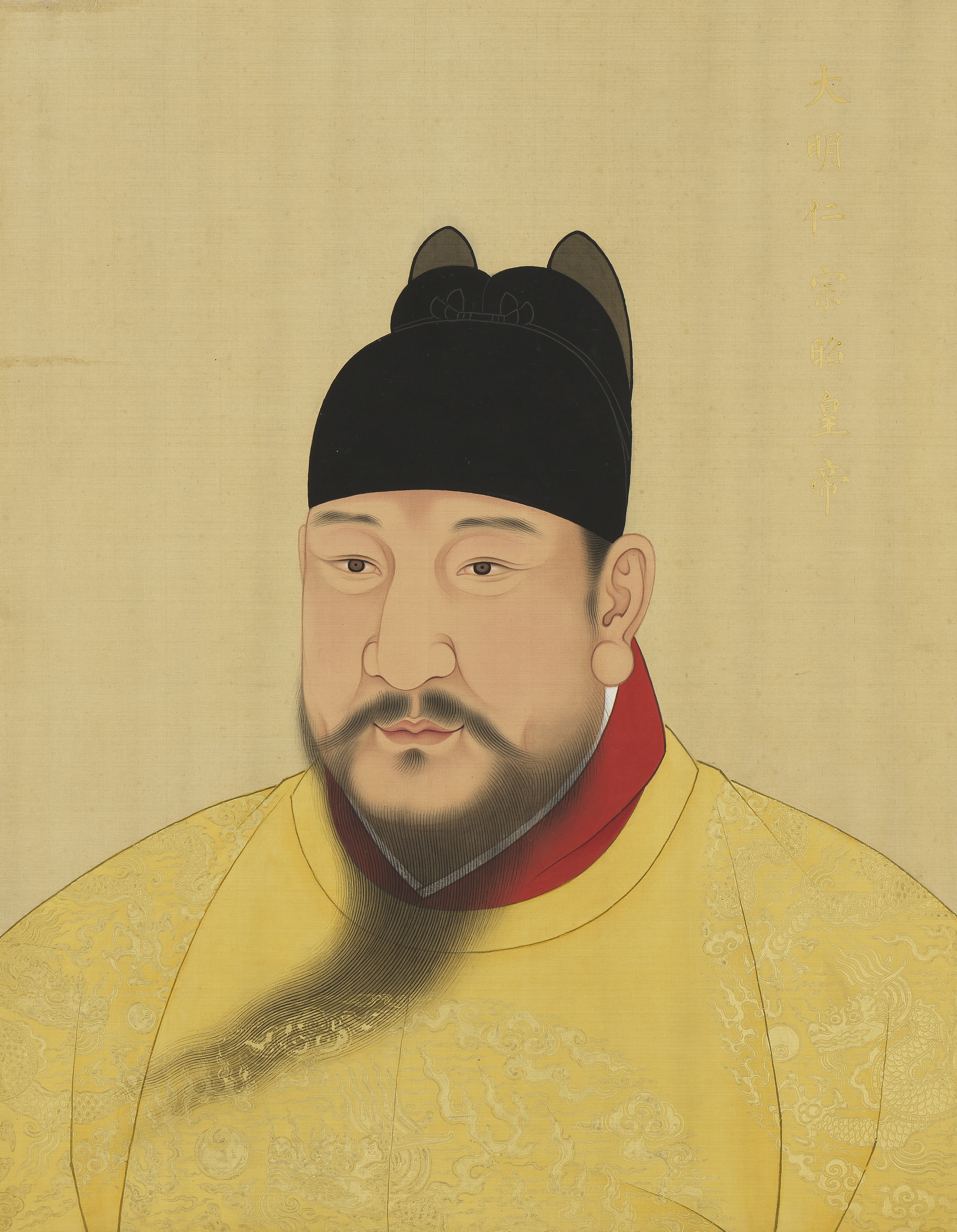
Portrait of the Hongxi Emperor in daily dress

By the end of 1424, officials whom the Hongxi Emperor regarded as redundant, incompetent, or elderly had been dismissed, and capable officials were promoted. Censors were sent throughout the empire to investigate abuse of power and corruption, and to find capable individuals to fill vacant positions. On 18 October 1424, the Emperor gave the grand secretaries Yang Shiqi, Yang Rong, and Jin Youzi, along with Minister of Personnel Jian Yi (蹇義), the authority to confidentially report any misconduct by other officials to the ruler. He granted Grand Secretary Xia Yuanji this privilege at the end of the year. Some officials accused of corruption retained their positions, including Liu Quan (劉觀), the chief censor.

In February 1425, the Emperor appointed eunuch admiral Zheng He as the grand defender of Nanjing, but the eunuchs were generally kept under close observation. The reforms also affected the civil service examinations, as more candidates hailed from the southern provinces than from the northern provinces, the southern provinces having a higher population and level of education. The Emperor decided that 40% of the successful candidates in the metropolitan examinations would be from the north to increase northern representation in the civil service. His successors maintained this policy, and the Qing dynasty later adopted it.

The Hongxi Emperor sought to correct the Yongle government's judicial failings. The Yongle Emperor had executed many officials for their loyalty to his nephew and predecessor, the Jianwen Emperor. By late 1424, the government had vindicated these officials' families and returned their confiscated property. The Hongxi Emperor also reversed some of his own rulings, acknowledging that he had issued them in a fit of anger without considering the circumstances.

The Hongxi Emperor was particularly concerned about the people's financial hardship, which had grown under his father's reign. On the day of his enthronement, he formally ended the long-distance overseas voyages led by Zheng He, which had been suspended for several years, as well as the trade of tea for horses on the western and northern borders, logging expeditions in Yunnan, and gold and pearl missions to Yunnan and Jiaozhi (present-day northern Vietnam). His administration encouraged vagrants and the homeless to return to their homes and settle down. Many people had left their homes because of the heavy state taxes and demands of the Yongle government. The Hongxi Emperor promised a two-year tax and work obligation exemption for those who returned. He also dispatched a special investigative commission, led by Zhou Gan (周干), to Jiangnan (where desertion was prevalent). Based on their reports, the Hongxi Emperor's successor, the Xuande Emperor, pardoned the outstanding taxes and reduced their amount.

During his brief reign, the Hongxi Emperor ruled according to Confucian principles. He waived taxes for areas impacted by disasters and oversaw the distribution of food from government reserves. In these situations, he also lessened the burden of taxes and fees on the people, and eliminated additional taxes on resources such as wood, gold, and silver. He reprimanded officials who did not demonstrate enough effort in aiding the population.

Forthwith issue it [grain] in relief! What would loans accomplish! Relieving people's poverty ought to be handled as though one were rescuing them from fire or saving them from drowing. One cannot hesitate.

— The Hongxi Emperor's order to officials to give the people grain during famine

The Hongxi Emperor halted military campaigns into Mongolia, focused on strengthening the empire's northern outposts, and maintained normal relations with other countries, such as those in Central Asia. His government's main military concern was the ongoing war in Jiaozhi (present-day northern Vietnam). The Emperor recalled the head of the Jiaozhi government, Huang Fu (黃福), in office since 1407, and replaced him with Chen Zhi (陳智), Earl of Yongchang. However, the army was not reinforced and the Viet rebellion continued. Historians view Huang Fu's recall negatively and consider it to be the main reason for the Ming dynasty's defeat, as he was highly experienced and respected in the province.

One month before his death, the Hongxi Emperor decided to move the capital back to Nanjing. This move was primarily influenced by Xia Yuanji and other high-ranking officials due to financial concerns. The Emperor himself preferred Nanjing over the northern region. On 16 April 1425, he declared the Beijing authorities as "temporary" (行在, xingzai) and two weeks later, he sent his heir, Zhu Zhanji, to Nanjing. His death halted the project, since his successor cancelled the plan, being more aligned with the policies of the Yongle Emperor and not sharing the Hongxi Emperor's disapproval of the northern focus of government.

== Death and legacy ==
The Hongxi Emperor died suddenly in Beijing on 29 May 1425, reportedly from a heart attack, according to the chief eunuch. This explanation has been considered more likely in light of his obesity and foot problems, rather than later speculations involving lightning, poisoning, and excessive sexual activity. He was given the posthumous name Emperor Zhao (昭帝; 'Luminous Emperor') and the temple name Renzong (仁宗; 'Benevolent Ancestor'). His tomb, Xian Mausoleum, located near Beijing, was built in a simple and austere style, which historian Chan Hok-lam interpreted as reflecting the character of his reign.

The Hongxi Emperor's main objective was to put an end to the actions of the Yongle government that he deemed incorrect and un-Confucian. He aimed to create a Confucian government that would serve as a model, with a morally upright emperor at the helm and wise and virtuous ministers. The relocation of the capital to Nanjing was also a clear indication of a departure from the Yongle Emperor's aggressive expansionist approach, which focused heavily on the northern border.

After the Hongxi Emperor's death, the empire continued to be governed by the grand secretaries and ministers he had appointed. They served until the early 1440s under his son, the Xuande Emperor, and his widow, Empress Zhang. Because of his untimely death, the Hongxi Emperor was unable to fully realize his aims. Confucian-educated officials failed to gain full support among other Ming elite groups and were unable to dismantle the eunuchs' independent agencies or prevent their continued growth under the Xuande Emperor and his successors. Nevertheless, they remained the dominant faction within the Ming government, managing the state's daily affairs until the end of the dynasty. Historical writings have associated the Hongxi Emperor's reign with Confucian political ideals, particularly his reliance on learned officials. None of his successors sought to return the capital to Nanjing, and the policy was formally abandoned in 1441.

The Hongxi Emperor has been praised in Chinese historiography as an enlightened Confucian monarch who, following ideals of simplicity, kindness, and earnestness, sought to consolidate the empire and alleviate the harsh and unpopular economic policies of the Yongle era. Although he occasionally faced criticism for his impulsiveness in punishing officials who displeased him, he was able to acknowledge his mistakes and apologize for them. His faults were balanced by his character as a humane emperor and sincere efforts to ensure the public good.

== Family ==
The Emperor had ten sons and seven daughters, but only nine sons and four daughters survived to adulthood. The eldest son, Zhu Zhanji, was the heir to the throne from November 1424. His mother was Empress Zhang. He succeeded his father as the Xuande Emperor. Empress Zhang was an influential figure within the imperial family and court during the reigns of her husband and son. She survived both of them and later became regent for her grandson, Emperor Yingzong, playing an important role in government during the early years of his reign. She was posthumously honored as Empress Chengxiaozhao.

- Empress Chengxiaozhao (誠孝昭皇后) of the Zhang clan (張氏; 1379–1442)
  - Zhu Zhanji (朱瞻基), the Xuande Emperor (宣德帝; 1399–1435), first son
  - Zhu Zhanyong (朱瞻墉), Prince Jing of Yue (越靖王; 1405–1439), third son
  - Zhu Zhanshan (朱瞻墡), Prince Xian of Xiang (襄憲王; 1406–1478), fifth son
  - Princess Jiaxing (嘉興公主; d. 1439), first daughter. Married in 1428 to Jing Yuan (井源; d. 1449).
- Noble Consort Gongsu (恭肅貴妃) of the Guo clan (郭氏; d. 1425)
  - Zhu Zhankai (朱瞻塏), Prince Huai of Teng (滕懷王; 1409–1425), eighth son
  - Zhu Zhanji (朱瞻垍), Prince Zhuang of Liang (梁莊王; 1411–1441), ninth son
  - Zhu Zhanshan (朱瞻埏), Prince Gong of Wei (衛恭王; 1417–1439), tenth son
- Consort Gongjingxian (恭靜賢妃) of the Li clan (李氏; d. 1452)
  - Zhu Zhanjun (朱瞻埈), Prince Jing of Zheng (鄭靖王; 1404–1466), second son
  - Zhu Zhanyin (朱瞻垠), Prince Xian of Qi (蘄獻王; 1406–1421), fourth son
  - Zhu Zhan'ao (朱瞻墺), Prince Jing of Huai (淮靖王; 1409–1446), seventh son
  - Princess Zhending (真定公主; d. 1450), seventh daughter. Married in 1429 to Wang Yi (王誼).
- Consort Zhenjingshun (貞靜順妃) of the Zhang clan (張氏)
  - Zhu Zhangang (朱瞻堈), Prince Xian of Jing (荊憲王; 1406–1453), sixth son
- Consort Gongyihui (恭懿惠妃) of the Zhao clan (趙氏)
  - Princess Qingdu (慶都公主; d. 1440), personal name Yuantong (圓通), second daughter. Married in 1428 to Jiao Jing (焦敬).
- Consort Zhenhuishu (貞惠淑妃) of the Wang clan (王氏; d. 1425)
- Consort Hui'anli (惠安麗妃) of the Wang clan (王氏; d. 1425)
- Consort Gongxishun (恭僖順妃) of the Tan clan (譚氏; d. 1425)
- Consort Gongjingchong (恭靖充妃) of the Huang clan (黃氏; d. 1425),
- Consort Daoxili (悼僖麗妃) of the Li clan (李氏)
- Consort Zhenjingjing (貞靜敬妃) of the Zhang clan (張氏)
- Unknown
  - Princess Qinghe (清河公主; d. 1434), third daughter. Married in 1429 to Li Ming (李銘).
  - Princess De'an (德安公主), fourth daughter
  - Princess Yanping (延平公主), fifth daughter
  - Princess Deqing (德慶公主), sixth daughter

== See also ==
- Chinese emperors family tree (late)

== Notes ==
Hongxi Emperor House of Zhu Born: 16 August 1378 Died: 29 May 1425
Regnal titles
Preceded by Yongle Emperor	Emperor of the Ming dynasty 12 August 1424 – 29 May 1425	Succeeded by Xuande Emperor
Chinese royalty
Vacant Title last held by Zhu Wenkui	Crown Prince of the Ming dynasty 12 May 1404 – 12 August 1424	Vacant Title next held by Zhu Zhanji
