= Thomas Taylor Meadows =

British sinologist

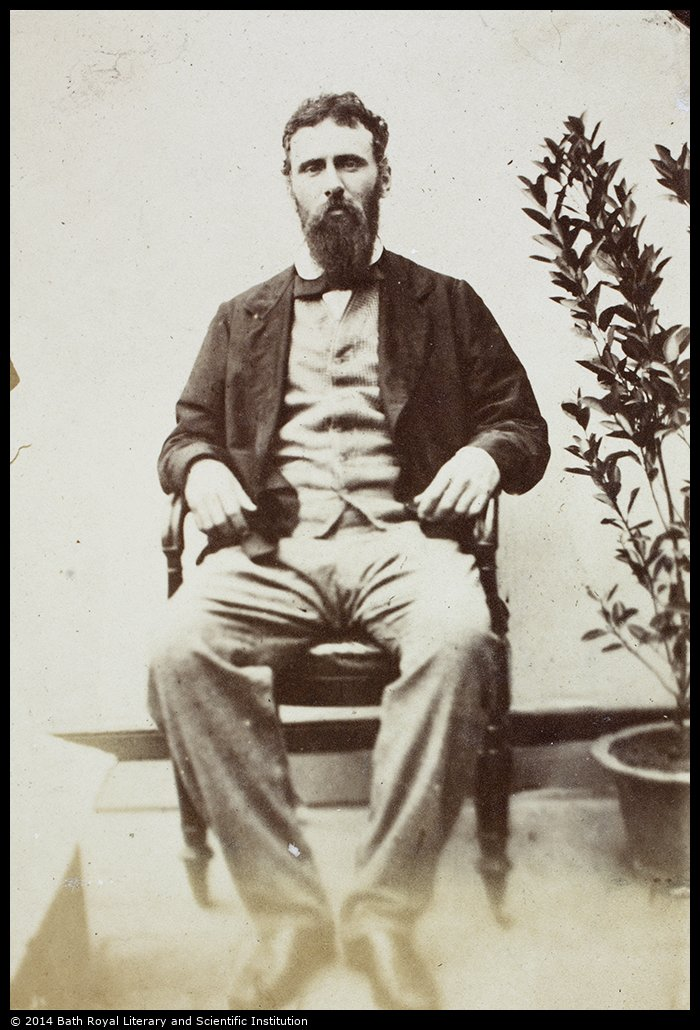
- Born: 1815; England
- Died: 1868 (aged 52–53)
- Occupation: Diplomat
- Years active: Victorian era
- Relatives: John Armstrong Taylor Meadows (brother)

Academic background
- Education: Ludwig-Maximilians-Universität München
- Academic advisor: Karl Friedrich Neumann

Academic work
- Discipline: Sinology

Thomas Taylor Meadows (1815–1868) was a British sinologist and diplomat. Born in Northern England, after studies in Chinese with Karl Friedrich Neumann at the Ludwig-Maximilians-Universität München, he became a member of the British diplomatic corps, arriving in Hong Kong in 1842, and becoming Acting Consul in Shanghai from 1859 to 1863. His best-known work are "Desultory Notes on the Government and People of China and on the Chinese Language" and "The Chinese and their Rebellions." The latter is valued as a close account of the Taiping Rebellion. He died in north China.

Historian John S. Gregory considered him both "deeply concerned for China, and a profound student of its history and culture" as well as "an agent of Western imperialism in China." His younger brother was John Armstrong Taylor Meadows.
