= A Prank =

- Short story by Pu Songling
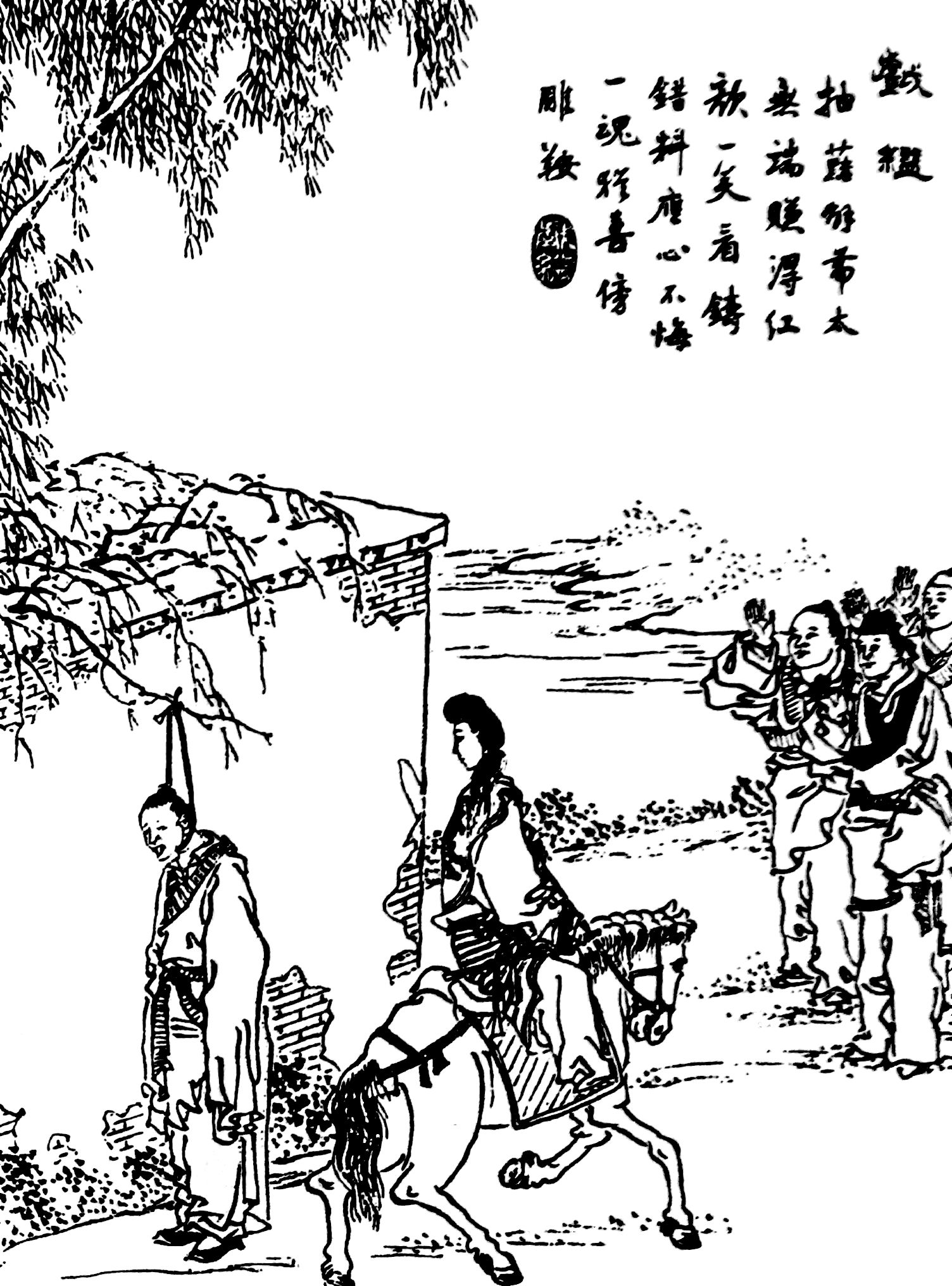
- 19th-century illustration from Xiangzhu liaozhai zhiyi tuyong (Liaozhai Zhiyi with commentary and illustrations; 1886)
- Original title: 戏缢 (Xi yi)
- Translator: John Minford
- Country: China
- Language: Chinese
- Genre: Zhiguai

Publication
- Published in: Strange Stories from a Chinese Studio
- Publication type: Anthology
- Publication date: c. 1740
- Published in English: 2006

Chronology
The Thunder God (雷公)	The Dead Monk (死僧)

"A Prank" (simplified Chinese: 戏缢; traditional Chinese: 戲縊; pinyin: Xì Yì) is a short story by Pu Songling collected in Strange Stories from a Chinese Studio (1740) that pertains to a prankster whose act goes awry. It was translated into English by John Minford in 2006.

== Plot ==
A renowned prankster from Shandong attempts to humour a horse-riding maiden; egged on by his friends, he pretends to hang himself on a millet stalk from afar, exclaiming that he wishes to die. The girl is amused and rides off, but the mischievous man remains in his act, which is beginning to look more believable. The truth is discovered upon scrutinisation – he had really hanged himself to death! Pu Songling comments, "Let this be a warning to all libertines and pranksters." (Note: In Chinese: "是可以為儇薄之戒。")

== Background ==
The story, barely four to five lines long in its original form, was written by Pu Songling and appears in Strange Tales from a Chinese Studio (1740). Originally titled "Xi yi", it was fully translated into English in 2006 by John Minford as "A Prank". A reviewer for the thirtieth volume of the 1991 Journal of Central China Normal University: Philosophy and Social Sciences (华中师范大学学报) regards the entire tale as an allegory of the Qin dynasty which highlights the fleetingness of life. Separately, an entry in Wai guo wen xue yan jiu (Foreign Literature Study) stresses that the prankster's death was a result of peer influence; had his friends not encouraged him to pretend to hang himself, he might not have met such a strange demise for the sake of cheap laughs. Similarly, another critic, writing in Beifang luncong, notes that such incidents, while "absurd", are quite commonplace. The story is cited in Judith T. Zeitlin's Historian of the Strange (1996) as "Playing at Hanging".
