= The Fornicating Dog =

- Short story by Pu Songling
- Original title: 犬奸 (Quan jian)
- Translator: John Minford
- Country: China
- Language: Chinese
- Genre: Zhiguai

Publication
- Published in: Strange Stories from a Chinese Studio
- Publication type: Anthology
- Publication date: c. 1740
- Published in English: 2006

Chronology
The Wounded Python (斫蟒)	The God of Hail (雹神)

"The Fornicating Dog" (simplified Chinese: 犬奸; traditional Chinese: 犬姦; pinyin: Quǎn Jiān; lit. 'Dog Sodomy') is a short story by Chinese author Pu Songling first published in Strange Stories from a Chinese Studio (1740). The story pertains to a Chinese merchant's spouse, a zoophile who develops sexual relations with the family's pet dog; Pu himself was critical of such phenomena as sexual fixation on animals. It was dropped from early editions, both Chinese and translated, of Liaozhai, notwithstanding Pu's original manuscript, and was translated into English by John Minford in 2006.

== Plot ==
An unnamed Qingzhou businessman often travels abroad for extended periods, leaving his wife alone at home with their pet canid, a white dog. Without her partner by her side, his wife begins engaging in bestiality with the dog — this gradually becomes a routine. Upon the merchant's return, the dog violently kills him in bed. Word of this spreads, and an incensed Magistrate calls in both woman and dog for questioning. They are found guilty and made to perform their sex acts in public, after which both are sentenced to death by lingchi. (Note: An execution method tellingly known as "cutting into ten thousand pieces" practised in China till 1905, described as "the cruellest and most ignominious of all Chinese punishments".)

Observing that "this woman is certainly not the only creature with a human visage to have coupled with an animal", Pu Songling writes in an "Appended Judgement", "(The wife) was a yaksha-demon in bed, a bitch on heat". He also calls for the dog to be "torn limb from limb, and his soul dragged before Yama".

== Background ==
Originally titled "Quan jian" (犬奸), the story first appeared in Pu Songling's Strange Tales from a Chinese Studio (also known as Liaozhai). However, it was omitted from virtually all printed editions of Liaozhai until the twentieth-century, such as in Zhu Qikai (1989). It was translated into English by John Minford in 2006, under the title "The Fornicating Dog". Zeitlin (1997) cites it in a footnote, translating the title as "The Dog Who Committed Adultery". The theme of the short story is bestiality, a common practice during Pu's time. A Ming dynasty circular lists a few recorded cases of bestiality with animals like snakes, horses, sheep, donkeys, even tigers, and dogs.

== Reception ==
Frances Weightman, in her 2008 book The Quest for the Childlike in Seventeenth-century Chinese Fiction, calls the story, which she cites as "Adultery with a dog", one of the "most shocking tales in the collection". In discussing the story, Song (2010) notes that although he finds copulation with animals "shameful", he recognises it as a platform for people to explore their sexuality.
