= A. R. Davis =

Asian Studies academic in Australia

Albert Richard ('Bertie') Davis (1924-1983) was born in Dorking and died in Sydney. The Chair of Oriental Studies at the University of Sydney for over a quarter-century, he was a major figure in the development of Asian Studies in Australia.

Having worked during World War II for the Royal Navy as a translator of Japanese, Davis studied Chinese at the University of Cambridge 1946–1948, graduating with First Class Honours. After teaching at Cambridge for some years, he became Chair of Oriental Studies at the University of Sydney in 1955, becoming one of the leading academics in Asian Studies in Australia. According to Rafe de Crespigny, "At the time of his appointment he was the youngest professor in Australia, and the head of the oldest department of Asian studies." The founder of the Oriental Society of Australia (1956) and the editor of the Journal of the Oriental Society of Australia after the return of Ian Nish to the United Kingdom, Davis also authored scholarly studies of Tao Yuanming and Du Fu, edited an anthology of modern Japanese poetry, and translated the autobiography of Mitsuharu Kaneko. Along with Liu Ts'un-yan at ANU, Davis substantially "shaped the tenor and direction of research into Chinese literature and studies [in Australia] for the next twenty-five years." In 1958, he delivered the 20th George Ernest Morrison Lecture in Ethnology. An obituary by John Manning Ward called Davis "a fine scholar, sensitive, imaginative and exceptionally learned. He was also in his quiet and friendly way a builder, whose achievements are bequeathed to the world of scholarship, to his colleagues and to the reputation of his Department and adopted University."

His students at the University of Sydney included the literary scholars and translators Mabel Lee and Bonnie S. McDougall as well as the scholar and diplomat Jocelyn Milner Chey and Margaret South, a key figure in the development of Asian studies in New Zealand. The annual A.R. Davis Memorial Lecture is given in his honour and a postgraduate research scholarship in Chinese or Japanese at the University of Sydney named after him.
