= John S. Gregory =

Australian sinologist (1923–2021)

John Stradbroke Gregory (2 August 1923 – 22 June 2021), known as Jack and generally publishing as J.S. Gregory, was an Australian professor of Chinese history noted for his biography on Chiang Kai-shek and British involvement in the Taiping Rebellion. Born in Melbourne, he taught at Melbourne High School from 1946 to 1950 and again in 1952 before pursuing a PhD at SOAS University of London. After beginning to teach at Melbourne University (1958–67) most of his professional life was spent at La Trobe University. He gave the 1984 Morrison Lecture on "The Chinese and their Revolutions" (an allusion to a work by Thomas Taylor Meadows) and contributed the George Ernest Morrison entry to the Australian Dictionary of Biography.
