= Frodsham (surname) =

Frodsham is a surname. Notable people with the surname include:

- Alf Frodsham, English rugby league footballer who played in the 1920s and 1930s and coached in the 1940s
- Charles Frodsham (1810–1871), English watch and clockmaker
- Eric Frodsham (1923–2003), English rugby league footballer
- George Horsfall Frodsham (1863–1937), DD, English-born Anglican Bishop of North Queensland
- Ian Frodsham (1975–1995), English association footballer who was at Liverpool
- John Frodsham (1930–2016) Emeritus Professor of English and Comparative Literature at Murdoch University, Western Australia, Sinologist and translator of Chinese literature

== See also ==
- Frodsham Hodson, principal of Brasenose College, Oxford
- Frodsham, market town in Cheshire, England

Media related to Frodsham (surname) at Wikimedia Commons
