= Pelle Strindlund =

Swedish writer and animal rights advocate

Pelle Strindlund (born 8 October 1971) is a Swedish writer and animal rights advocate.

Born in Sundsvall, Strindlund has a degree in philosophy and Spanish, and an MA in religious studies. He is a founding member of the Rescue Service, an animal rights group, and is known in Sweden for having engaged in direct action on behalf of animals and in opposition to the Swedish arms industry. He is a member of Ofog (Direct Action for Peace).

== Selected works ==
- Jordens Herrar: Slaveri, djurförtryck och våldets försvarare (Karneval förlag, 2011)
- with Stellan Vinthagen. Motståndets väg: Civil olydnad som teori och praktik (Karneval förlag, 2011)
- with Annika Spalde. Leva etiskt: Om att ta ansvar för världen och njuta av livet (Karneval förlag, 2009)
- with Annika Spalde. Every Creature a Word of God. Vegetarian Advocates Press, 2008.
- with Klaus Engell-Nielsen and Annika Spalde. Ickevåld! Handbok i fredlig samhällsförändring (Karneval förlag, 2008)
- "Butchers' Knives into Pruning Hooks: Civil Disobedience for Animals", in Peter Singer (ed). In Defense of Animals: The Second Wave (Blackwell, 2006)
- with Annike Spalde. Varje varelse ett Guds ord: Omsorg om djuren som kristen andlighet (Arcus förlag, 2005)
- with Annike Spalde. I vänliga rebellers sällskap: Kristet ickevåld som konfrontation och ömhet (Arcus förlag, 2004)
- with Toivo Jokkala. Djurrätt och socialism (Lindelöws bokförlag, 2001)

== See also ==
- List of animal rights advocates
