= W. G. Goddard =

Australian writer and broadcaster

William George Goddard (1887–1986) was an Australian intellectual, broadcaster, and writer who "spent much of the 1950s and 1960s serving the Nationalist Chinese regime on Taiwan" and wrote books in support of the Chiang Kai-shek regime there. He had "a considerable influence on the ways in which Taiwan was thought about in many parts of the world" through his books, such as Formosa: A Study in Chinese History (1966) some of which were translated into Chinese and Spanish.

== Career ==
Born in Newcastle, NSW he worked in China before returning to Australia, becoming a "prominent international affairs commentator in the 1930s" at the Brisbane-area 4BC station, writing The New Order in Asia : An Essay on the Future of Civilisation (1940) and in 1941 giving the Morrison Lecture with the title "The Min Shen. A Study in Chinese Democracy". After the Nationalist retreat to Taiwan, Goddard visited Taipei in 1954, renewing his links with the Kuomintang government. He retired to the United Kingdom in the 1970s, where he died in 1986.
