= John Armstrong Taylor Meadows =

British interpreter

John Armstrong Taylor Meadows (1817–1875) was a British interpreter in China, and the younger brother of Thomas Taylor Meadows. Working at Ningbo, he met Robert Hart. Disenchanted with government service, he became a merchant. He had several children by his Chinese partner, and died in Tianjin.
