= Harry Simon (sinologist) =

German-born sinologist (1923–2019)

Harry Felix Simon (13 September 1923 – 7 July 2019) was a sinologist at the University of Melbourne, where he taught for 27 years.

== Early life ==
Harry Simon was born on 13 September 1923 in Berlin. His father was the distinguished scholar of Chinese, Manchu, and Tibetan Walter Simon, and the family moved to London to escape the Nazis in 1936.

== Career ==
After studies in Chinese in London and then in Chengdu, he served as interpreter and published in Monumenta Serica and Bulletin of the School of Oriental and African Studies. After the Myer Foundation established Oriental Studies at the University of Melbourne, he became the foundation professor of Chinese there in 1961 and oversaw the growth of Asian languages there as well as playing a role in building the scholarly institutions of Asian studies in Australia. He became dean of the faculty of arts between 1966-1977. Retiring from University of Melbourne in 1988, he continued his career at Lingnan University in Hong Kong, ultimately serving as vice-president of the university before moving back to Australia in 1996. In 2010, he made a major gift of Chinese books to the university's library. As a scholar, he also published on translation and literature, but his contributions to Chinese linguistics may be best-known. His 1963 George Ernest Morrison Lecture in Ethnology was entitled "Some Motivations of Chinese Foreign Policy."

== Death ==
Simon died on 7 July 2019 in Melbourne.
