= Ignacio Fleta =

Spanish luthier (1897–1977)

- Born: Ignacio Fleta Pescador; 31 July 1897; Huesa del Común, Spain
- Died: 11 August 1977 (aged 80); Barcelona, Spain
- Occupation: Luthier
- Years active: 1927–1977
- Children: 2

Ignacio Fleta Pescador (31 July 1897 – 11 August 1977) was a Spanish luthier and a crafter of string instruments such as guitars, violins, cellos, violas, as well as historical instruments. Fleta is widely regarded as one of the foremost classical guitar makers in the history of the instrument and sometimes described as the Stradivarius, or Steinway, of the guitar. Born into a family of cabinet makers, he initially built string- and historical instruments, and was inspired by Andrés Segovia to focus his efforts on the guitar.

During Ignacio Fleta's Golden Age, from the 1960s to the 1970s, he revolutionized the cedar top and is considered the greatest maker in that material. Fleta's guitars from this period are known as the "Rolls-Royce" of the classical guitar world.

Throughout the 20th century, he was championed by guitarists such as Andrés Segovia, John Williams and Alirio Díaz.
