= Chen Chih-Mai =

Republic of China diplomat

Chen Chih-Mai (Chinese: 陳之邁) (1908–1978) was a Republic of China diplomat who served as ambassador to several countries. After graduating from Tsinghua University in 1928, he pursued further studies in the United States, ultimately receiving a Ph.D. from Columbia University in 1933. After returning to China, he taught at Tsinghua University, Peking University, Nankai University and several other universities. He served in the Ministry of Education and in the Executive Yuan during the war, and in 1944 was transferred to the Embassy of the Republic of China in the United States. In 1955, he became the ROC Ambassador to the Philippines followed by posts as Ambassador to Australia (1959–66) and Ambassador to New Zealand from 1961 to 1966 before becoming Ambassador to Japan (1966–69) and Ambassador to the Holy See (1969–1978) and Ambassador to Malta (1971–78). He wrote about Chinese art, culture, and politics, delivered the 20th George Ernest Morrison Lecture in Ethnology in 1960, and published in the Journal of the Oriental Society of Australia.
