= Mischa Titiev =

American anthropologist

Mischa Titiev (1901–1978) was a Russian Empire-born American anthropologist, whose career was principally at the University of Michigan. His fieldwork concerned Japan, Chile, Peru, and the American Southwest, where his work on Hopi people was particularly noted, including his books Old Oraibi (1944) and The Hopi Indians of Old Oraibi: Change and Continuity (1972).

Born in Kremenchug in 1901, he migrated with his family to Boston in 1907, earning B.A. (1923), M.A. (1924), and Ph.D. degrees (1935) at Harvard University, the former two in English literature, the latter in anthropology. The following year, he joined the faculty at the University of Michigan, where he worked until retirement in 1970.

In 1954, as part of a Fulbright professorship at the Australian National University, he gave the Morrison Lecture, entitled "Chinese Elements in Japanese Culture."
