= F. H. van Naerssen =

Dutch epigraphist (1904–1974)

Frits Herman "Kees" van Naerssen (1904 – 7 June 1974) was a scholar of Javanese epigraphy and an early figure in Asian studies in post-war Australia.

== Education and career ==
F. H. van Naerssen was born in Semarang, Netherlands East Indies (now Indonesia) in 1904 and studied theology and Indonesian languages at Leiden University, Netherlands, earning a doctorate ("Dr. Ph. et Litt.") in old Javanese epigraphy in 1941 under Nicolaas Johannes Krom, a Dutch epigrapher, archaeologist, historiographer and researcher into early Indonesian history and traditional culture.

He worked as adjunct secretary for the Koninklijk Instituut voor Taal-, Land- en Volkenkunde (KITLV) (English, "Royal Institute for the Linguistics, Geography and Ethnology"), which was at that time located in The Hague, and as curator of the Javanese collections at the Koloniaal Instituut (English, "Colonial Institute") in Amsterdam in the years 1939-46 before teaching as a lector in sociology at the Agricultural University of Wageningen from 1946 to 1956.

He taught at the University of Sydney from 1957 to 1970, an appointment that was the result of an Australian government grant for Indonesian studies. He was the first appointment (as reader), the first acting head and then in 1966 the foundation professor of Sydney University's Department of Indonesian and Malayan Studies, and at the time, "he alone in Australia has the equipment necessary to begin, among other things, old Javanese studies." His student Stuart Robson would recall "he came from an old Indies family and had grown up in Klaten (Central Java), so he had a strong affinity with Java and had the almost 'mystical' air of a silver-haired sage."

He contributed to the journal Bijdragen tot de Taal-, Land- en Volkenkunde (English title: Journal of the Humanities and Social Sciences of Southeast Asia and Oceania); to the Cultureel Indië, a monthly magazine about cultural life in the Dutch East Indies that was published between 1939 and 1946; and the Journal of the Oriental Society of Australia.

An annual memorial prize, the F. H. van Naerssen Memorial Prize for Indonesian Studies, is given for Indonesian Studies at the University of Sydney.

Van Naerrsen belonged to a small pioneering group of scholars working towards the spread of Asian studies in Australia, and the Australian public's growing interest in Asia, in the decades following World War II. In addition to his university endeavours, he was first chairman of a committee responsible for assembling book lists for the study of Indonesian in secondary schools in New South Wales.

== Personal life ==
After guiding the new department for many years, F. H. van Naerssen retired from the university in 1970 but still came into the faculty office a few times a week. He lived in Gordon, New South Wales, a suburb on Sydney's upper north shore. He died in 1974 in the Netherlands during a visit to see his daughter there. He was survived by his wife, his daughter and two grandchildren.

== Select bibliography ==
- "Twee Koperen Oorkonden van Balitung in het Koloniaal Instituut te Amsterdam", in: Bijdragen tot de Taal-, Land- en Volkenkunde (English, "Journal of the Humanities and Social Sciences of Southeast Asia"), 95:1, 1 January 1937, pp. 441–461.
- "Ancient Javanese recording of the past", in: Arts: The Journal of the Sydney University Arts Association, (1968), 5: 30-46.
- The Economic and Administrative History of Early Indonesia, Leiden and Cologne: E. J. Brill, 1977 (Handbook of Oriental Studies, Section 3: Southeast Asia, Volume 7). Joint author: R. C. De Jongh.

A lengthier bibliography can be seen here.
