= Tien Ju-K'ang =

Chinese anthropologist and historian (1916–2006)

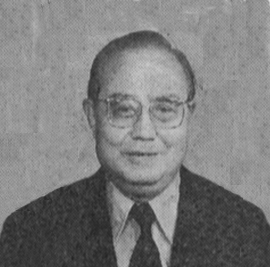
Tien Ju-K'ang

Tien Ju-K'ang (Chinese: 田汝康; pinyin: Tian Rukang; 1916–2006) was a Chinese anthropologist and historian, best known for his work on the Chinese of Sarawak. Other works concerned the history of Protestantism in China, medical anthropology and the Dai people.

Born in Kunming, he first studied at Peking Normal University (1935-1937) before going abroad to the London School of Economics, initially to study psychology. On the advice of Raymond Firth, he switched to anthropology. His 1953 work The Chinese of Sarawak, A Study of Social Structure drew on his fieldwork in 1948 and 1949 and gives a rare mid-20th century scholarly account of a Borneo society. Though a professor at Fudan University, he faced persecution for his overseas connections (including siblings who had studied overseas and his own Chinese Canadian wife) beginning in 1952, and during the Cultural Revolution twice attempted suicide. However, in the post-Mao era, he returned to active scholarship and received numerous invitations to lecture abroad. For his Morrison Lecture in 1981, he lectured on the history of his native province, "Moslem Rebellion in China: A Yunnan Controversy," about what is now generally known as the Panthay Rebellion.
