= John Williams (guitarist) =

Australian guitarist (born 1941)

John Williams AO OBE
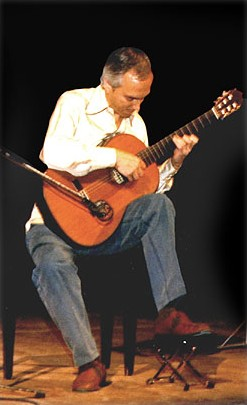
- Williams in concert in Córdoba, 1986

Background information
- Born: John Christopher Williams; 24 April 1941 (age 85); Melbourne, Australia
- Genres: Classical, pop rock, rock, classical rock, progressive rock
- Occupations: Guitarist, arranger, composer
- Years active: 1958–present
- Label: Sony Classical/SME
- Formerly of: Sky
- Spouse: Kathy Panama (m. 2000)
- Children: 2, including Kate Williams
- Parent(s): Len Williams and Melaan (née Ah Ket)
- Relatives: William Ah Ket (grandfather)

John Christopher Williams (born 24 April 1941) is an Australian and English guitarist known for his solo and ensemble playing as well as his interpretation and promotion of the modern classical guitar repertoire. In 1973, he shared a Grammy Award in the Best Chamber Music Performance category with fellow guitarist Julian Bream for Together (released in the US as Julian and John (Works by Lawes, Carulli, Albéniz, Granados)). Guitar historian Graham Wade called John Williams "perhaps the most technically accomplished guitarist the world has seen."

== Early life ==
John Williams is an only child who was born on 24 April 1941 in Melbourne, Australia, to an English father, Len Williams, who bought John, at the age of four, his first guitar with a modified neck. Len later founded the Spanish Guitar Centre in London, England. John's mother Melaan (née Ah Ket) was the daughter of William Ah Ket, the first Australian barrister of Chinese heritage. In 1952, the family moved to England, where John attended Friern Barnet Grammar School, London.

Williams was initially taught guitar by his father, who was a musically disciplined and accomplished classical guitarist. From the age of 11, Williams attended summer courses with Andrés Segovia at the Accademia Musicale Chigiana in Siena, Italy. He attended the Royal College of Music in London, from 1956 to 1959, studying piano because the college did not have a guitar section. In 1958, when he was 17 years old, he made his musical debut performing publicly at London's Wigmore Hall. Upon graduating from his college, he was invited to create and then to run their guitar department for its first two years. Williams maintains links with the college (and also with the Royal Northern College of Music in Manchester).

== Classical guitarist ==
Since his first professional performance at the Wigmore Hall in London on 6 November 1958, Williams has performed throughout the world and has made regular appearances on radio and TV. He has extended the repertoire by commissioning guitar concertos from composers such as Peter Sculthorpe, Stephen Dodgson, André Previn, Patrick Gowers, Richard Harvey and Steve Gray. Williams has recorded albums of duets with fellow guitarists Julian Bream and Paco Peña.

Williams is a visiting professor and honorary member of the Royal Academy of Music in London.

Williams mostly uses Greg Smallman guitars, after using Spanish Fleta during the 1970s.

== Thoughts on guitar education and teaching ==
Williams has expressed his frustration and concern with guitar education and teaching, that it is too one-sided, i.e., focusing only on solo playing, instead of giving guitar students a better education, including ensemble playing, sight-reading and a focus on phrasing and tone production and variation. Williams notes that "students [are] preoccupied with fingerings and not notes, much less sounds"; some are able "to play [...] difficult solo works from memory", but "have a very poor sense of ensemble [playing] or timing". He notes that students play works from the solo repertoire that are often too difficult, so that the teachers often put more "emphasis [...] on getting through the notes rather than playing the real substance of each note". To encourage phrasing, tone production and all-around musicianship, Williams arranges for students to play together in ensembles, choosing works from the existing classical music repertoire, such as the "easier Haydn String Quartets".

== Other musical genres ==
Although Williams is best known as a performing classical guitarist, he has explored many different musical genres, as well as being a composer and arranger.

Williams is perhaps best known to the general public for his recording of the Stanley Myers piece "Cavatina". The piece originally included only the first few bars of the tune as it is known today, but at Williams' request Myers rewrote and expanded it into the better-known guitar arrangement. After this transformation, it was used for a film, The Walking Stick, in 1970. In 1973, Cleo Laine wrote lyrics and recorded it as the song "He Was Beautiful" accompanied by Williams. The guitar instrumental version became a worldwide hit single when it was used as the theme tune to the Oscar-winning film The Deer Hunter (1978).

Between 1978 and 1984, Williams was a member of the instrumental fusion group Sky, with whom he recorded six successful albums and scored a UK Top Five single with "Toccata". At the invitation of producer Martin Lewis, he created a highly acclaimed classical-rock fusion duet with rock guitarist Pete Townshend of the Who on Townshend's anthemic "Won't Get Fooled Again" for the 1979 Amnesty International benefit show The Secret Policeman's Ball. The duet featured on the resulting album and the film version of the show, bringing Williams to the broader attention of the rock audience.

== Personal life ==
Williams and his third wife, artist Kathy Panama (whom he married on New Year's Eve 2000), have residences in London (Hampstead) and Cornwall. He has a daughter, Kate Williams, who is an established jazz pianist. He also has a son, Charlie, by his second wife, the television presenter Sue Cook.

== Awards and recognitions ==
Williams was appointed an Officer of the Order of the British Empire (OBE) in the 1980 Birthday Honours, and an Officer of the Order of Australia (AO) in the 1987 Australia Day Honours, "For service to music".

=== Bernard Heinze Memorial Award ===
The Sir Bernard Heinze Memorial Award is given to a person who has made an outstanding contribution to music in Australia.

| Year | Nominee / work | Award | Result |
|---|---|---|---|
| 2013 | John Williams | Sir Bernard Heinze Memorial Award | awarded |

=== Brit Awards ===
| Year | Nominee / work | Award | Result |
|---|---|---|---|
| 1983 | John Williams for Portrait of John Williams | Best Classical Recording | Won |

=== Brit Awards ===
| Year | Nominee / work | Award | Result | Ref. |
|---|---|---|---|---|
| 2012 | British Academy of Songwriters, Composers and Authors | BASCA Gold Badge Award | Won | |

=== Edison Classical Music Awards ===
| Year | Nominee / work | Award | Result | Ref. |
|---|---|---|---|---|
| 2007 | John Williams | Oeuvreprijs | awarded | |

=== Grammy Awards ===
| Year | Nominee / work | Award | Result |
|---|---|---|---|
| 1973 | Julian Bream & John Christopher Williams for Julian and John (Works by Lawes, Carulli, Albéniz, Granados) | Grammy Award for Best Chamber Music Performance | Won |
