= George Ernest Morrison =

Australian geologist (1862–1920)

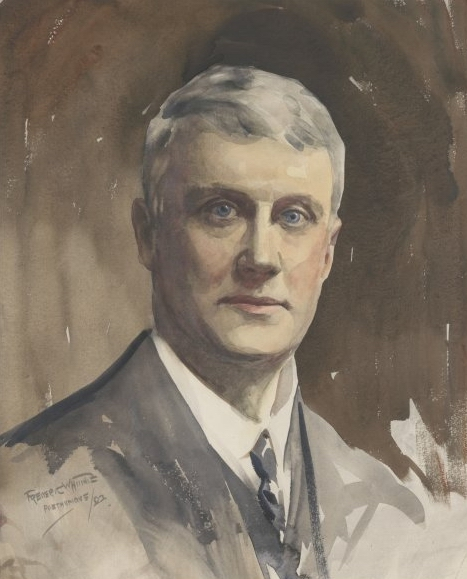
Morrison, in a 1902 portrait

George Ernest Morrison (4 February 1862 – 30 May 1920) was an Australian journalist, political adviser to and representative of the government of the Republic of China during World War I, and owner of the then largest Asiatic library ever assembled.

== Early life ==
Morrison was born in Geelong, Victoria, Australia. His father George Morrison, who emigrated from Edinkillie, Elgin, Scotland, to Australia in 1858, was headmaster of The Geelong College where Morrison was educated. George Sr married Rebecca Greenwood, of Yorkshire, in 1859, and Morrison was the second child of the marriage. Three of Morrison's seven uncles were rectors of the Presbyterian Church, and two of the four others were principal (Alexander) and master (Robert) of Scotch College, Melbourne, where George Sr also taught mathematics for six months. Another Uncle, Donald Morrison, was the Rector of The Glasgow Academy between 1861 until 1899. He won Geelong College's Scripture History gold medal in 1876 and, an all-round athlete, the Geelong College Cup for running in 1878.

At 16, Morrison idolised explorer Henry Morton Stanley—so much so, in fact, that he wrote a book on Australian exploration in admiration of him.

During a vacation in early 1880, before his tertiary education, he walked from the heads at Queenscliff, Victoria, to Adelaide, following the coastline, a distance of about 650 miles (960 km) in 46 days. He sold his diary of the journey to the Leader for seven guineas. Despite having already made up his mind to become a "Special Correspondent", he initially studied medicine at the University of Melbourne. After passing his first year, the 18-year-old took a vacation trip down the Murray River in a canoe, the Stanley, from Albury, New South Wales, to its mouth, a distance of some 2,000 kilometres (1,243 mi). The first person to do so, he completed the distance in 65 days. Attracted more to adventure than study, he failed his exams two years running (which he later called "one of the fortunate episodes of my life").

== Slave ship undercover reporting, 1882 ==
On 1 June 1882, he sailed for the New Hebrides, while posing as crew of the brigantine slave ship, Lavinia, for three months, which sought to "recruit" Kanakas, in an undercover reporting scheme that Morrison had hatched for The Age; storied proprietor David Syme had promised £1 a column (equivalent to A$152 in 2022), so it's reasonable to believe Morrison was doing this as a moral imperative, not for financial incentive. His eight-part series, "A Cruise in a Queensland Slaver. By a Medical Student" was, by October, also published in the weekly companion publication, The Leader. Written in a tone of wonder, and expressing "only the mildest criticism"; six months later, Morrison "revised his original assessment", describing details of the Lavinia's blackbirding operation, and sharply denouncing the slave trade in Queensland. His articles, letters to the editor, and The Age editorials, sparked considerable debate, leading to government intervention to eradicate what was, by Morrison's account, a slave trade.

== New Guinea ==
Morrison next visited New Guinea and did part of the return journey on a Chinese junk. Landing at Normanton, Queensland, at the end of 1882, Morrison decided to walk to Melbourne. He was not quite 21, he had no horses or camels, and was unarmed. However, carrying his swag and swimming or wading the rivers in his path, he traversed the necessary 2043 miles (3270 km) in 123 days. No doubt the country had been much opened up in the twenty years since Burke and Wills' well-funded failure, but the journey was nevertheless a remarkable feat, which stamped Morrison as a great natural bushman and explorer. He arrived at Melbourne on 21 April 1883 to find that during his journey Thomas McIlwraith, the premier of Queensland, had annexed part of New Guinea and was vainly endeavouring to secure the support of the British government for his action.

Financed by The Age and the Sydney Morning Herald, Morrison was sent on an exploration journey to New Guinea. He sailed from Cooktown, Queensland, in a small lugger, arriving at Port Moresby after a stormy passage. On 24 July 1883, Morrison, with a small party started with the intention of crossing to Dyke Ackland Bay, 100 miles (160 km) away. Much high mountain country barred the way, and it took 38 days to cover 50 miles. The indigenous population became hostile and, about a month later, Morrison was struck by two spears and almost killed. Retracing their steps, with Morrison strapped to a horse, Port Moresby was reached in days. Here Morrison received medical attention, but it was more than a month before he reached the hospital at Cooktown. Morrison had penetrated farther into New Guinea than any previous European. After a week's recovery in hospital, Morrison went on to Melbourne. The head of a spear remained in his groin, however, as surgical removal was not thought feasible at the time by most surgeons.

== Education, graduation and further travels ==
Morrison's father decided to send the young George to John Chiene, professor of surgery at the University of Edinburgh. The professor removed the spear head successfully, and Morrison resumed his medical studies there. He graduated M.B., Ch.M., on 1 August 1887.

After graduation, Morrison travelled extensively in the United States, the West Indies, and Spain, where he became medical officer at the Rio Tinto mine. He then proceeded to Morocco, became physician to the Shereef of Wazan, and travelled in the interior. Study at Paris, under Dr. Charcot, followed before he returned to Australia in 1890; for two years he was resident surgeon at the Ballarat Hospital.

== East Asia ==
Leaving the hospital in May 1893, he went to East Asia, and in February 1894 began a journey from Shanghai to Rangoon. He went partly by boat up the Yangtze River and rode and walked the remainder of the 3,000 miles (4,800 km). Disguised under a hat with queue attached, he completed the journey in 100 days at a total cost of less than £30 (equivalent to A$5,196 in 2022), which included the wages of two or three Chinese servants whom he picked up and changed on the way as he entered new districts. He was quite unarmed and then knew hardly more than a dozen words of Chinese. But he was willing to conform to—and respect—the customs of the people he met, and everywhere he was received with courtesy. In his interesting account of his journey, An Australian in China, which he managed to sell outright for £75 (equivalent to A$11,716 in 2022) and have published in 1895, he spoke well of the personalities of the many missionaries he met; however, he thought them outrageously ineffective, citing Yunnan as an example, where 18 missionaries took eight years to convert 11 Chinese. He later regretted this, as he felt he had given a wrong impression by not sufficiently stressing the value of their social and medical work.

After his arrival at Rangoon, Morrison went to Calcutta, where he became seriously ill with intermittent fever and nearly died. Having recovered, he returned to Geelong in November 1894 on the Port Melbourne. He did not stay long. After being refused a job at The Argus for being unable to "write up to [the editor's] standard", he turned down a lucrative offer to return to medical practice in Ballarat for ship's surgeon on a boat to London. He went to Scotland, presented a thesis to the University of Edinburgh on "The Heredity Factor in the Causation of Various Malformations and Diseases", and received his M.D. degree in August 1895. He was introduced to Moberly Bell, editor of The Times, who appointed him a special correspondent in the East. In November, he went to Siam and travelled extensively in the interior.

From Siam, he crossed into southern China, and at Yunnan fell seriously ill from what he diagnosed to be bubonic plague. Having overcome the illness by inducing profuse perspiration, he then made his way through Siam to Bangkok, a journey of nearly a thousand miles.

== The Times correspondent ==
In February 1897, The Times appointed Morrison as the first permanent correspondent at The Argus, and he took up his residence there in the following month. Unfortunately, his lack of knowledge in the Chinese language meant that he could not verify his stories and one author has suggested some of his reports contained bias and deliberate lies against China. Aware of Russian activity in Manchuria at this time, Morrison went to Vladivostok in June. He travelled over a thousand miles to Stretensk and then across Manchuria to Vladivostok again. He reported to The Times that Russian engineers were making preliminary surveys from Kirin towards Port Arthur (Lüshunkou). On the very day his communication arrived in London, 6 March 1898, The Times received a telegram from Morrison to say that Russia had presented a five-day ultimatum to China demanding the right to construct a railway to Port Arthur. This was a triumph for The Times and its correspondent, but he had also shown prophetic insight in another phrase of his dispatch, when he stated that "the importance of Japan in relation to the future of Manchuria cannot be disregarded". Germany had occupied Kiao-chao towards the end of 1897, and a great struggle for political preponderacy was going on.

In January 1899, he went to Siam and wrote that there was no need for French interference in that country and that it was quite capable of governing itself. He travelled extensively during the following 15 months, returning first to Peking, then on to Korea, Assam, England, Australia, Japan and back to Peking via Korea.

The Boxer Uprising broke out soon after and, during the siege of the legations from June to August, Morrison, an acting-lieutenant, showed great courage, always ready to volunteer in the face of danger. He was superficially wounded in July but was erroneously reported as killed and the subject of a highly laudatory obituary notice occupying two columns of The Times on 17 July 1900. After a siege of 55 days, the legations were relieved on 14 August 1900 by an army of various nationalities under General Alfred Gaselee. The army then ransacked much of the palaces in Peking, with Morrison taking part in the looting, making off with silks, furs, porcelain and bronzes.

When the Russo-Japanese War broke out on 10 February 1904, Morrison became a correspondent with the Japanese army. He was present at the entry of the Japanese into Port Arthur (now Lüshunkou) early in 1905, and represented The Times at the Portsmouth, New Hampshire, United States, peace conference. In 1907, he crossed China from Peking to the French border of Tonkin, and, in 1910, rode from Honan City, Burma, across Asia to Andijan in Russian Turkestan, a journey of 3,750 miles (6,000 km), which was completed in 174 days. From Andijan, he took a train to St Petersburg, and then traveled to London, arriving on 29 July 1910.

Morrison returned to China the next year and, when plague broke out in Manchuria, went to Harbin, where there had been success in stemming its spread. He wrote a series of articles advocating the launch of modern scientific public health services in China. When the 1911 Revolution began, Morrison took the side of the revolutionaries.

Morrison was a tall and fearless man. He had sought adventure, gathering experience and knowledge as he went. Polly Condit Smith, who was alongside Morrison during the Boxer uprising, wrote: "Although he was not a military man he had proved himself one of the most important members of the garrison, being always in motion and cognizant of what was going on everywhere, and by far the best informed person within the Legation quadrangle. To this must be added a cool judgement, total disregard of danger and a perpetual sense of responsibility to help everyone to do his best – the most attractive at our impromptu mess, as dirty, happy and healthy a hero as one could find anywhere." Sir Robert Hart, on the other hand, in Peking at the same time as Morrison, regarded him as a lazy, self-indulgent man—intolerant, racist, and unprincipled.

== Political adviser ==
Citing poor pay and lack of prospects, in August 1912 Morrison resigned his position at The Times to become a political adviser to the President of the Chinese Republic, at a salary equivalent to £4,000 (equivalent to A$548,932 in 2022) a year, and immediately went to London to assist in floating a Chinese loan of £10 million (equivalent to A$1372 million in 2025). In China, during the following years, he had an anxious time advising upon, and endeavouring to deal with, the political intrigues that prevailed. He was instrumental in ensuring that Peking foster its relations with the United States over Japan during this period. He visited Australia, again, in December 1917, and returned to Peking, in February 1918. He represented China during the peace discussions at Versailles, in 1919, but his health began to decline, and he retired to England.

== Personal life ==
Morrison had married, in 1912, Jennie Wark Robin (1889–1923), his former secretary, who survived him by only three years. His three sons, Ian (1913–1950), Alastair Gwynne (1915–2009), and Colin (1917–1990), all grew to adulthood and graduated at the University of Cambridge. He died on 30 May 1920, at Sidmouth, Devon, and is buried there.

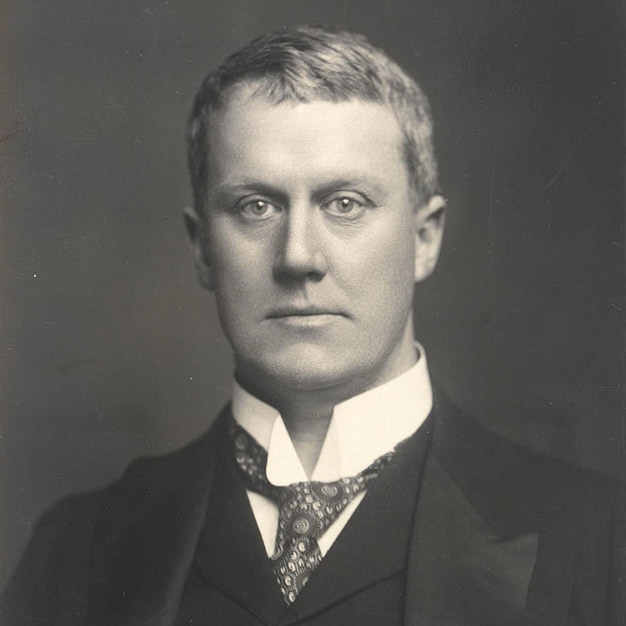
George Morrison (1862–1920)

== Legacy ==
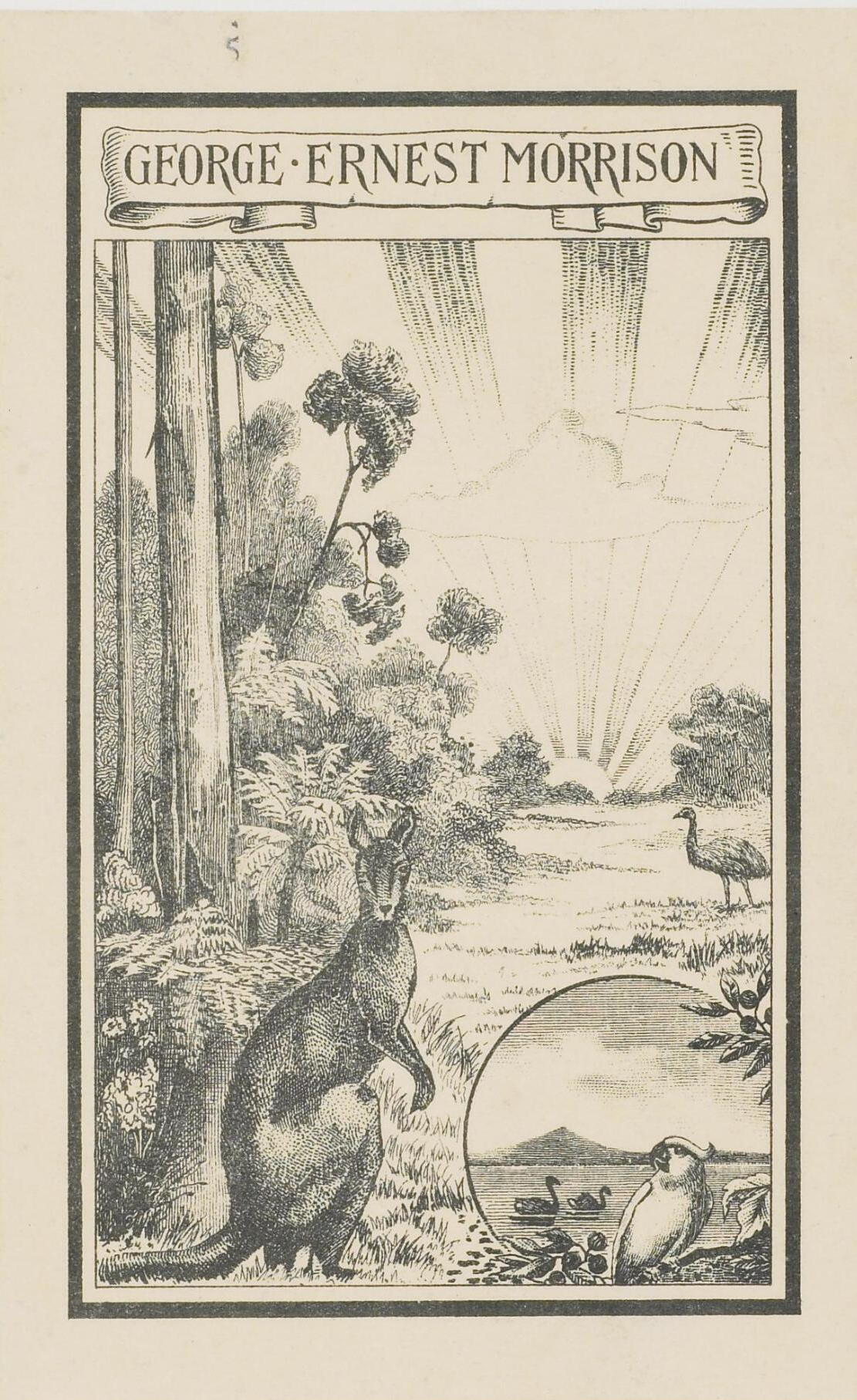
Ex libris George Ernest Morrison

In his role as adviser to the president of China, Morrison is credited with having a significant influence on China's decision to enter World War I in opposition to Germany, and in its foreign relations thereafter.

Morrison could not speak Chinese fluently, but he was an avid collector of books on China in Western languages. In 1917, Morrison's remarkable library, which contained the largest number of books on China ever collected, was sold to Baron Iwasaki Hisaya, son of Iwasaki Yatarō, the founder of Mitsubishi Corporation, of Tokyo, for £35,000 (equivalent to $3,778,369 in 2022), with the provisos that it remain intact and that serious students should have access to it. It had taken 18 years at a cost, by 1912, of £12,000 (equivalent to $1,646,795 in 2022) for Morrison to accumulate—ultimately, some 24,000 works. He had no other assets of note at the time of the sale.

The collection, considered by far the most extensive Asiatic library ever assembled, subsequently became the foundation of the Oriental Library in Tokyo. In 1932, the inaugural George Ernest Morrison Lecture in Ethnology was delivered at Canberra, a fund having been established by Chinese residents of Australia to provide for an annual lecture in Morrison's memory.

Morrison's diaries, manuscripts and papers were bequeathed to the Mitchell Library, Sydney, Australia.

A fictional account of Morrison's romantic affair with Mae Ruth Perkins was published in A Most Immoral Woman by Australian author Linda Jaivin in 2009.

== See also ==
- Anglo-Chinese relations
- Sinophilia
- Ernest Satow who met Morrison many times in Peking, 1900–06
