= Journal of the Society for Asian Humanities =

JOSAH: Journal of the Society for Asian Humanities
- Discipline: Asian studies
- Language: English
- Edited by: Adrian Vickers

Publication details
- Former name(s): JOSA: Journal of the Oriental Society of Australia
- History: 1960 - present
- Publisher: Australian Society for Asian Humanities
- ISO 4: Find out here

Indexing
- ISSN: 2653-0848 (print); 2653-0856 (web)

Links
- Journal homepage

Journal of the Society for Asian Humanities (JOSAH) is a peer-reviewed academic journal published by the Australian Society for Asian Humanities covering research on the Asian Humanities. Founded in 1960 by A.R. Davis, it was until 2019 published under the name of Journal of the Oriental Society of Australia. The first editor was Ian Nish and early contributors to the journal include Prasanta Chandra Mahalanobis, Lo Hui-min, Wang Gungwu and F. H. van Naerssen while recent contributors include Meaghan Morris, Ghassan Hage, Tejaswini Niranjana, Tessa Morris-Suzuki and Imran bin Tajudeen. It publishes the A.R. Davis Memorial Lecture.

== Abstracting and indexing ==
The journal is abstracted and indexed in:

- Scopus
