= Kate Williams (pianist) =

British jazz pianist and composer

- Born: Kate Williams; London, England
- Genres: Jazz
- Occupations: Pianist, arranger, composer
- Instrument: Piano
- Formerly of: Kate Williams Quartet
- Website: kate-williams-quartet.com
- Father: John Williams

Kate Williams is a British jazz pianist and composer who formed the jazz ensemble Kate Williams Quartet with saxophonist Steve Kaldestad, flautist Gareth Lockrane, bassist Oli Hayhurst and drummer David Ingamells, among others. She has performed with many notable UK artists, including Chris Biscoe, Tina May, Henry Lowther, Jim Mullen, John Etheridge, Stan Sulzmann, Julian Siegel, Tim Whitehead and Karen Sharp.

== Early life and education ==
Kate Williams was born in London, England, into a musical family. Her mother is a classical pianist and her father is the guitarist John Williams.

== Discography ==
- 2011: Made Up
- 2012: Smoke And Mirrors
- 2014: Atlas and Vulcana
- 2016: Four Plus Three
