= Huang Huai =

Chinese official (1367–1449)

- 黃淮

Grand Secretary
- In office 1402–1414
- Monarch: Yongle
- In office 1424–1427
- Monarchs: Hongxi; Xuande

Personal details
- Born: 1367 Yongjia, Zhejiang
- Died: 22 June 1449 (aged 81–82)
- Education: jinshi degree (1397)

Chinese name
- Traditional Chinese: 黃淮
- Simplified Chinese: 黄淮
Transcriptions
Standard Mandarin
- Hanyu Pinyin: Huáng Huái

Huang Huai (Note: Huang Huai used the courtesy name Zongyu (宗豫) and the art name Jie'an (介庵). He was given the posthumous name Wenjian (文簡).) (1367 – 22 June 1449) was a Chinese scholar-official during the Ming dynasty. He held the position of grand secretary during the Yongle, Hongxi, and Xuande eras, serving from 1402 to 1414 and again from 1424 to 1427.

== Biography ==
Huang was born in 1367, during the Yuan dynasty, in Yongjia County, Zhejiang, China. In 1397, during the Ming dynasty, he passed the civil service examination and was granted the rank of jinshi.

In August 1402, the Yongle Emperor, the third Ming emperor, appointed him as one of the grand secretaries, who served as the Emperor's personal secretaries. In 1414, the Yongle Emperor led a campaign against the Mongols and left the government in the hands of his heir, Zhu Gaochi. Zhu Gaoxu, the younger brother of Zhu Gaochi, attempted to push his brother out of the state administration. Huang and his colleague Yang Shiqi supported the heir, and were consequently accused of disrupting the welcoming ceremony during the Emperor's return from his campaign, leading to their imprisonment. While Yang was able to clear his name and return to his position, Huang remained in prison for ten years. After the death of the Yongle Emperor, Huang was released and reinstated to his previous position before retiring three years later.

He died on 22 June 1449.
