= Charles Nelson Spinks =

American scholar and collector of Japanese art and books

Charles Nelson Spinks (1906–1980) was an American scholar and collector of Japanese art and books, acquired during residence in Japan first as an English professor (beginning 1936, the same year he had earned his PhD from Stanford University) and editor of Japan News-week (1938–1941). He served in US Naval Intelligence 1942–1946 and later at American embassies in Bangkok (1952–1956), Jakarta, and Canberra (from 1957). He later donated the bulk of his collections to American University though some items are also held in the Freer Gallery. He also published on Japanese culture and history as well as Thai ceramics and Khmer archaeology. He delivered the 1959 Morrison Lecture on Preah Vihear.
