= Zhu Zhanjun =

Chinese prince (1404–1466)

Zhu Zhanjun 朱瞻埈
- Prince of Zheng
- Born: 27 March 1404
- Died: 8 June 1466 (aged 62)
Posthumous name
- Prince Jing of Zheng (Note: Simplified Chinese: 郑靖王; traditional Chinese: 鄭靖王; pinyin: Zhèng Jìngwáng)
- House: Zhu
- Father: Hongxi Emperor
- Mother: Consort Li

Chinese name
- Chinese: 朱瞻埈
Transcriptions
Standard Mandarin
- Hanyu Pinyin: Zhū Zhānjùn

Zhu Zhanjun (27 March 1404 – 8 June 1466) was a prince of the Ming dynasty. He was the second son of the Hongxi Emperor, and his mother was Consort Li. On 1 December 1424, he was granted the title of Prince of Zheng (鄭王).

Upon the death of the Hongxi Emperor, Empress Zhang ordered Zhu Zhanjun and his brother, Zhu Zhanshan (朱瞻墡), Prince of Xiang, to serve as regents until the Xuande Emperor ascended the throne. Later, when the Xuande Emperor personally led a campaign to Le'an, he also entrusted Zhu Zhanjun and Zhu Zhanshan with the responsibility of guarding Beijing.

In 1429, Zhu Zhanjun was enfeoffed in Fengxiang Prefecture. In 1443, after the death of his tenth brother, Zhu Zhanshan (朱瞻埏), Prince Gong of Wei, Emperor Yingzong issued an edict reassigning Zhu Zhanjun to Huaiqing Prefecture. Before entering his princely establishment (王府), Zhu Zhanjun first stayed in Beijing, and the following year (1444), he went to his fiefdom.

Zhu Zhanjun had a violent personality and was known to have killed people on multiple occasions with his stick. In an effort to control his behavior, Emperor Yingzong appointed the censor Zhou Ying (周瑛) as his chief secretary. Zhu Zhanjun's reign lasted for forty-two years until his death in 1466. He was given the posthumous name "Jing" (靖). Two years later, his son Zhu Qiying (朱祁鍈) succeeded him.

== Family ==
- Princess Consort (王妃) of the Zhang clan (張氏; d. 1442), daughter of Zhang Ben (張本), Commander of the Central Warden (中兵馬指揮) (Note: She was made Princess Consort of Zheng (鄭王妃) in 1427.)
  - Zhu Qiying (朱祁鍈), Prince Jian of Zheng (鄭簡王; 1431–1495), first son
  - Zhu Qirui (朱祁銳), Prince of Xinping (新平王), second son
  - Zhu Qirong (朱祁鎔), Prince of Chaoyi (朝邑王), fourth son
- Lady of the Zhang clan (張氏)
  - Zhu Qixian (朱祁銑), Prince of Jingyang (涇陽王; 1433–1488), third son
- Unknown
  - Princess Xin'an (新安郡主), first daughter
    - Married Zhou Lian (周濂)
  - Princess Sishui (汜水郡主), second daughter
    - Married Cui Ming (崔銘)

== Notes ==
Zhu Zhanjun House of Zhu Born: 27 March 1404 Died: 8 June 1466
Chinese royalty
New creation	Prince of Zheng; 1 December 1424 – 8 June 1466	Vacant Title next held by Zhu Qiying
