= Vera Mackie =

Australian academic (born 1955)

Vera Mackie FRSN FASSA
- Born: Vera Christine Mackie; 1955 (age 70–71); Glasgow, Scotland
- Occupation: Historian

Academic background
- Education: Monash University BA, MA University of Adelaide PhD
- Thesis: Creating socialist women in Japan, 1900-1937 (1994)

Vera Mackie (born 1955) is an Australian academic who has specialised in Japanese feminism and gender history. As of 2021 she is Emeritus Senior Professor of Asian and International Studies at the University of Wollongong.

== Early life and education ==
Mackie was born in Glasgow, Scotland in 1955. In 1964 she moved to Victoria, Australia with her family, where she completed her secondary education at Mentone Girls' Grammar School. She completed a BA (Hons) and MA (1985) at Monash University, before receiving a PhD (1994) from the University of Adelaide.

== Career ==
From 1998 to 2004 Mackie was Foundation Professor of Japanese Studies at Curtin University. She then was appointed Australian Research Council (ARC) Australian Professorial Fellow at the University of Melbourne from 2004 to 2010. She moved to the University of Wollongong, initially as ARC Future Fellow (2010–2014), then moved into the position of Senior Professor of Asian and International Studies in 2014. She is now Emeritus Professor

Mackie served on the board of the International Federation for Research in Women's History from 2015 to 2020. She was co-convener of the Australian Women's History Network from 2013 to 2016. She is a member of the editorial board of Lilith: A Feminist History Journal, published by the Australian Women's History Network. Commissioning Editor, Japan Focus: The Asia-Pacific Journal, Commissioning Editor, VIDA: Blog of the Australian Women's History Network.

She delivered the 2021 A.R. Davis Memorial Lecture on "Asia in Australia: History on the Streets".

== Awards and recognition ==
Mackie was elected Fellow of the Academy of the Social Sciences in Australia in 2004 and Fellow of the Royal Society of New South Wales in 2018. She won the 2011 Inoue Yasushi Award for Outstanding Research in Japanese Literature. She was awarded the University of Wollongong Vice Chancellor's Award for Excellence in Research Supervision in 2018. In 2026, she was awarded honorary life membership of the Asian Studies Association of Australia.

== Works ==
- Mackie, Vera C; Japanese Studies Centre (Melbourne, Vic.) (1992). Gendering Japanese studies: a practical guide to teaching resources. Japanese Studies Centre. ISBN 978-0-7326-0419-6.
- Mackie, Vera C, ed. (1995). Feminism and the state in modern Japan. Japanese Studies Centre. ISBN 978-0-7326-0645-9.
- Mackie, Vera C (1997). Creating socialist women in Japan: gender, labour and activism, 1900-1937. Cambridge University Press. ISBN 978-0-521-55137-3.
- Mackie, Vera C (2001). Gender in Japan: power and public policy. Routledge. ISBN 978-0-415-20487-3.
- Mackie, Vera C (2003). Feminism in modern Japan: citizenship, embodiment and sexuality. Cambridge University Press. ISBN 978-0-521-82018-9.
- Mackie, Vera C, ed. (2014). Ways of knowing about human rights in Asia. Abingdon, Oxon New York, NY Routledge, Taylor & Francis Group. ISBN 978-1-138-83825-3.
- Germer, Andrea; Mackie, Vera C; Wöhr, Ulrike, eds. (2014). Gender, nation and state in modern Japan. Routledge. ISBN 978-1-315-76867-0.
- McLelland, Mark J.; Mackie, Vera, eds. (2015). Routledge handbook of sexuality studies in East Asia. Routledge. ISBN 978-1-315-77487-9.
- Crozier-De Rosa, Sharon; Mackie, Vera C (2019). Remembering women's activism. Routledge. ISBN 978-1-138-79488-7.
- Mackie, Vera C; Marks, Nicola; Ferber, Sarah, eds. (2019). The reproductive industry: intimate experiences and global processes. Lexington Books. ISBN 978-1-4985-7066-4.
- Ferber, Sarah; Marks, Nicola J.; Mackie, Vera (2020). IVF and assisted reproduction: a global history. Singapore: Palgrave MacMillan. ISBN 978-981-15-7895-3. OCLC 1227448920.
