= C. P. Fitzgerald =

British historian and author (1902–1992)

Charles Patrick Fitzgerald
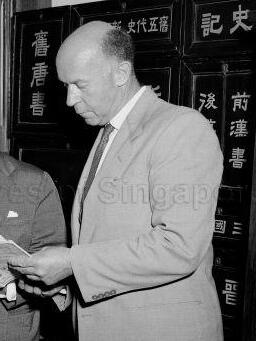
- Fitzgerald in 1956
- Born: Karl Patrick Van Hoogstraten; 5 March 1902; London, England, United Kingdom
- Died: 13 April 1992 (aged 90); Sydney, New South Wales, Australia
- Known for: East Asian studies (focus on China)
- Scientific career
- Fields: History
- Workplaces: Australian National University

Charles Patrick Fitzgerald FAHA (5 March 1902 – 13 April 1992) was a British historian and writer whose academic career occurred mostly in Australia. He was a professor of East Asian studies with particular focus on China.

== Early life and education ==
Fitzgerald was born in London, England. His parents were Hans Sauer, a migrant from Cape Colony. and his Irish-born wife Cecile Josephine, née Fitzpatrick.

Unable to attend university as his family could not afford the fees, he obtained a job in a bank. After becoming interested in East Asia and the political developments there, he studied for a diploma in Chinese at the University of London's School of Oriental Studies.

== Career ==
He first visited China at age 21, and subsequently lived and worked there for over 20 years. Between 1946 and 1950 he worked there for the British Council. After leaving China, Fitzgerald was invited to Australia by Douglas Copland, who had been Australian Minister to China (1946-1948). Fitzgerald served as a Reader in Far Eastern History at the Research School of Pacific (and Asian) Studies at the Australian National University, located in Canberra, Australia, from 1951 to 1953. He later became the first Professor of Far Eastern History, from 1953 to 1967.

He was a foundation fellow of the Australian Academy of the Humanities in 1969.

== Personal life ==
Fitzgerald married Pamela Sara Knollys on 15 February 1941 at Bradford on Avon, Wiltshire, England. They had three daughters.

He died in Sydney, New South Wales, in 1992.

== Writings ==
Fitzgerald's best-known book, China: A Short Cultural History (London: The Cresset Press, 1935; edited by C. P. Seligman), has been reprinted and revised several times. He authored many other books and articles, including:

- Son of Heaven: A Biography of Li Shih-Min, Founder of the T'ang Dynasty (Cambridge: University Press, 1933)
- The Tower of Five Glories (London: The Cresset Press, 1940)
- Introducing China (London: Pitman, 1948) (Joint author: George Yeh)
- Revolution in China (London: Cresset Press, 1952); revised edition: The Birth of Communist China (Harmondsworth, Middlesex: Penguin, 1964)
- Flood Tide in China (Cresset Press, 1952)
- Finding Out About Imperial China (London, Frederick Muller, 1961; Exploring the Past series)
- Empress Wu (Melbourne: F. W. Cheshire for the Australian National University, 1955)
- The Chinese View of Their Place in the World (London: Oxford University Press, 1964)
- Barbarian Beds: The Origin of the Chair in China (Canberra: Australian National University, 1965)
- The Third China: The Chinese Communities in South-East Asia (Melbourne, Victoria: Cheshire for the Australian Institute of International Affairs, 1965)
- Buddhism in Political Action in South East Asia (Canberra: St. Mark's Library, 1965)
- China in the Twenty-first Century (Hobart: Adult Education Board of Tasmania, 1968)
- China's Revolution 20 Years After (Sydney: D. B. Young, 1969)
- The Irrationality of the Fear of China (Summer Hill, N.S.W.: Australia-China Society, 1970)
- Communism Takes China: How the Revolution Went Red (London: B.P.C., 1971)
- Changing Directions of Chinese Foreign Policy (Canberra: Australian Institute of International Affairs, 1971)
- The Southern Expansion of the Chinese People: "Southern Fields and Southern Ocean" (Canberra: Australian National University Press, 1972)
- Mao Tse-Tung and China (Harmondsworth, Middlesex and New York: Penguin Books, 1977)
- China and South East Asia since 1945 (Camberwell, Victoria: Longman Australia, 1973)
- Why China?: Recollections of China, 1923–1950 (Carlton, Victoria: Melbourne University Press, 1985)
- "The Historical Background of Chinese Military Tradition" (1964) in the Journal of the Oriental Society of Australia

== See also ==
- List of Australian National University people
