= Linda Jaivin =

Translator, essayist and novelist

Linda Jaivin (born 27 March 1955) is an American-born Australian sinologist, translator and novelist.

== Early life ==
Linda Jaivin was born in New London, Connecticut, to a Jewish family of Russian heritage. Her grandfathers were Jewish refugees from Tsarist Russia, who emigrated to Argentina and the United States.

Her interest in China led her to undertake Chinese studies at Brown University in Rhode Island. She moved to Taiwan in 1977 to deepen her knowledge of Chinese culture and language. Moving to Hong Kong in 1979, her first job there was editing textbooks for Oxford University Press. She worked for Asiaweek magazine, where she met the Australian scholar Geremie Barmé, whom she later married.

They returned to Canberra, Australia in 1986. They divorced in 1994. She now lives in Sydney.

== Work ==
Jaivin has written a memoir of her experiences as a translator in China, The Monkey and the Dragon, as well as a number of novels. She co-edited an anthology on dissident writers in China, New Ghosts, Old Dreams: Chinese Rebel Voices with Geremie Barmé, in 1992. Jaivin has contributed to a number of magazines including the Australian magazine of politics and culture, The Monthly. She wrote for the Quarterly Essay Found in Translation: In Praise of a Plural World in November 2013.

She has subtitled many Chinese films, including Farewell my Concubine and The Grandmaster.

Jaivin has been a guest on the ABC radio program The Book Show and a panelist on Q&A and other programs.

== Bibliography ==
=== Novels ===
Year	Title	Imprint	ISBN
1995	Eat Me	Vintage Books	ISBN 9781784702748
1996	Rock 'n' Roll Babes from Outer Space	Text Publishing	ISBN 9781921799938
2006	The Infernal Optimist	Fourth Estate	ISBN 9780732282752
2009	A Most Immoral Woman	HarperCollins	ISBN 9780730445975
2012	Dead Sexy: The Wicked Story	Text Publishing	ISBN 9781921799952
2014	The Empress Lover	Fourth Estate	ISBN 9780732291273
2014	Miles Walker, You're Dead	St. Martin's Griffin	ISBN 9781466882379

=== Non-fiction ===
Year	Title	Imprint	ISBN
2001	The Monkey and the Dragon: A True Story About Friendship, Music, Politics and Life on the Edge	Text Publishing	ISBN 1876485914
2012	Confessions of an S & M Virgin	Text Publishing	ISBN 9781921799945
2013	Found in Translation: In Praise of a Plural World	Black, Inc.	ISBN 9781863956307
2014	Beijing	Reaktion Books	ISBN 9781780232614
2021	The Shortest History of China	Black Inc.	ISBN 9781760641122
2025	Bombard the Headquarters! : The Cultural Revolution in China	Old Street Publishing	ISBN 9781913083946

- Jaivin, Linda (August 2014). "The rising tide of narcissism". Arts & Letters. Books. The Monthly. 103: 50–51. Review of Anne Manne's The Life of I.

== Films (as sub-titler) ==
- Farewell My Concubine (Chen Kaige, 1993).
- Hero (Zhang Yimou, 2002).
- The Grandmaster (Wong Kar-wai, 2013).
