= Chen Wei-ping =

Chinese diplomat

Chen Wei-ping (Chinese: 陳維屏), also known as W.P. Chen or Wei-ping Chen (July 30, 1876 – February 23, 1972), was a Chinese diplomat.

== Early life ==
He studied at Peking Methodist University, Ohio Wesleyan University, the University of Michigan and the University of Boston. He returned to China in 1916 and became involved with the Chinese Christian press and organisations.

== Career ==
He served as Consul General of the Republic of China in Australia from 1931 to 1935, when China did not have an ambassador to Australia. He was succeeded by Pao Chun-jien.

As consul, he sought to increase Chinese exports to Australia and to warn Australians about Japan's increasing militarism and aggression, including publishing books and pamphlets. He sought concessions surrounding the White Australia policy. He sought to allow Chinese immigrants to return to China and be replaced by a relative to continue operating their business.

A history of the Kuomintang in Australasia concluded that Chen "received a great deal of criticism from the community, as he was seen as being more concerned with (Kuomintang) party affairs than with improving the status of the Chinese in Australia."

He gave the inaugural George Ernest Morrison Lecture in Ethnology at Australian National University (expressing the "earnest hope that the Australian people will extend to my countrymen sympathy and trust and that the great nation of China may be united with the great Anglo-Saxon race to preserve the peace of the world.").

== Later years ==
He went to Taiwan in 1949, where he served as the chaplain for the Republic of China Armed Forces. He often visited the United States at the invitation of various church groups there, giving lectures throughout the country. In later life, Chen became known as pastor of Shih-Ling Church near Taipei, where Chiang Kai-shek and his family attended services, as they had in Nanjing where he was their personal minister. He died in Taipei in 1972.
