= Jamila Hussain =

Jamila Hussain (1942, Katoomba - 31 August 2016, Sydney) was a Muslim community leader in Australia and an academic at the University of Technology Sydney.

== Biography ==
Born in 1942 in Katoomba, New South Wales, she studied at the University of Sydney. She married a Chinese Muslim man and studied Shariah law in Malaysia. Widowed in 1994, she returned to Australia and pursued a career as community leader, commentator, and academic. She was the author of Islam, Its Law and Society. She died in 2016. Her public commentary on Islam, Sharia and its place in Australia appeared in Sydney Morning Herald, SBS and in interviews on the ABC.
