= Jordens herrar =

2011 book by Pelle Strindlund

Jordens Herrar
- First edition
- Author: Pelle Strindlund
- Original title: Jordens Herrar
- Language: Swedish
- Publisher: Karneval Förlag
- Publication date: 2011-01-00 (orig.)
- Publication place: Sweden
- Media type: Print (Hardcover)
- Pages: 320
- ISBN: 978-91-85703-67-8 (Swe. trans.)

Jordens Herrar is a 2011 book by Swedish author Pelle Strindlund. The book compares the contemporary treatment of animals in industrial settings to historical human slavery practices.
