= Chan Hok-lam =

Hong Kong historian (1938–2011)

Chan Hok-lam (Chinese: 陳學霖; pinyin: Chén Xuélín) (1938, Hong Kong – 2011, Seattle) was a Hong Kong-born historian of China. His obituary in the Journal of Song-Yuan Studies considered that "his works have inescapably influenced the research of nearly all those after him who have entered into the uniquely challenging sub-discipline of middle-period Chinese studies." Focusing on the period from the 9th to the 15th centuries, he was the author of 19 volumes of history in English and Chinese, a major contributor to two other large collaborative works, and over a hundred essays and reviews in history journals.

== Education ==
Born in Hong Kong to parents from Guangdong Province, he entered University of Hong Kong in 1958, earning B.A. (1961) and M.A. (1963) there before completing doctoral studies at Princeton University with Frederick Mote and James T.C. Liu.

== Academic career ==
He began his teaching career at the University of Auckland and began collaborating with Herbert Franke on annotating the History of Jin. In 1968, he left for Columbia University where he began working on the Dictionary of Ming Biography. From 1972, he taught at the University of Washington and at 1990 was appointed to CUHK. His 1983 Morrison Lecture focused on the control of publishing in Chinese history.

== Publications ==
His most enduring work is on Song, Yuan and Ming politics and thought, including work in Journal of the American Oriental Society, Harvard Journal of Asiatic Studies, Journal of Asian History, Asia Major and a contribution to The Cambridge History of China on the period 1399–1435.
