= Karl Friedrich Neumann =

German orientalist (1793–1870)

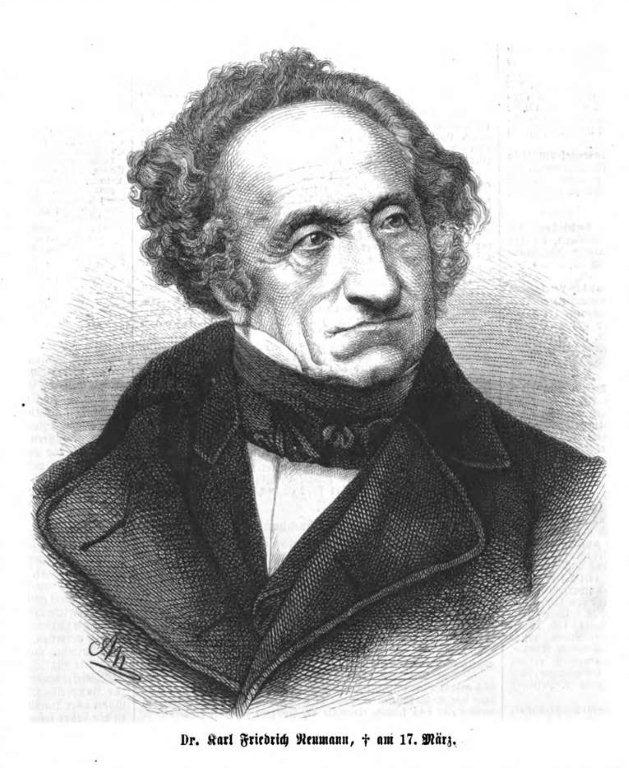
Karl Friedrich Neumann

Karl Friedrich Neumann (28 December 1793 – 17 March 1870) was a German orientalist.

== Life ==
Neumann was born into a poor Jewish family, under the name of Bamberger, at Reichsmannsdorf, near Bamberg. After his Bar Mitzwa he had to leave his family and with the support of relatives ended up in Frankfurt as a house teacher. He studied philosophy and philology at Heidelberg University, Ludwig-Maximilians-Universität München (LMU Munich) and the University of Göttingen, became a convert to Protestantism and took the name of Neumann. From 1821 to 1825 he was a teacher in Würzburg and Speyer; then he learned Armenian in Venice at the San Lazzaro degli Armeni and visited Paris and London.

From April 1830 to May 1831 he undertook a journey from London to Canton in China on the East Indiaman Sir David Scott, where he studied the language and amassed a large library of valuable books and manuscripts. These, about 12,000 in number, he presented to the royal library at Munich. Returning to Germany in 1833, Neumann was made professor of Armenian and Chinese at the LMU. He held this position until 1852, when, owing to his pronounced revolutionary opinions, he was removed from his chair. Ten years later he settled in Berlin, where he remained until his death in 1870.

== Works ==
Neumann's leisure time after his enforced retirement was occupied in historical studies, and besides his "Geschichte des englischen Reichs in Asien" (Leipzig, 1857, 2 volumes), he wrote a history of the United States of America, Geschichte der Vereinigten Staaten von Amerika (Berlin, 1863–1866, 3 volumes).

His other works include:

- Versuch einer Geschichte der armenischen Literatur (Leipzig, 1836)
- Die Völker des südlichen Russland (1846, and again 1855)
- Geschichte des englisch-chinesischen Kriegs (1846, and again 1855)

He also issued some translations from Chinese and Armenian:

- The Catechism of the shamans, or, The laws and regulations of the priesthood of Buddha in China (1831).
- Vahram's Chronicle of the Armenian Kingdom in Cilicia, during the time of the Crusades (1831); translation of Vahram of Edessa (fl. c. 1303–1330).
- History of the pirates who infested the China Sea from 1807 to 1810 (1831).

The journal of the Royal Asiatic Society (London, 1871) contains a full list of his works.
