= John Frodsham =

British-born Australian academic

John David Frodsham FAHA (5 January 1930 – 5 May 2016) was a British-born Australian academic who held posts in various areas of literary studies in Iraq, Malaya, Tanzania, and Australia. After studies at Emmanuel College, Cambridge, he worked at the University of Baghdad before completing his doctorate at the Australian National University with a thesis on Xie Lingyun. He was elected to the Australian Academy of the Humanities in 1969. He became the Foundation Professor of English and Comparative Literature at Murdoch University as Foundation Dean of the School of Human Communication from 1973 to 1976. He conducted Murdoch courses incorporating Chinese culture and literature, and in public lectures about china and its culture.

He retired from Murdoch in 2015, died in 2016, and was survived by children, grandchildren, and great-grandchildren.

His best-remembered works are likely his translations of Li He, regarded as "the gold standard" for that poet, and still in print.

== Selected works ==
- Frodsham, J. D. (John David) (1965), Nature poetry, Chinese and English : an address given at Cornell University, March 16, 1965, s.n
- Frodsham, J. D. (John David) (1967), The murmuring stream: the life and works of the Chinese nature poet Hsieh Ling-yün (385-433), Duke of K'ang-Lo, University of Malaya Press, distributed by Oxford U.P.
- Frodsham, J. D. (John David) (1970), New perspectives in Chinese literature, Australian National University Press, ISBN 978-0-7081-0219-0
- Frodsham, J. D. (John David); Ch'êng, Hsi (1967), An anthology of Chinese verse : Han, Wei, Chin and the northern and southern dynasties, Clarendon P
- Li, He (28 March 2017), The collected poems of Li He, Frodsham, J. D., (translator); Rouzer, Paul F., (writer of preface), New York Review Books (published 2016), ISBN 978-962-996-932-5
