= William Ah Ket =

Australian barrister (1876–1936)

- 麥錫祥
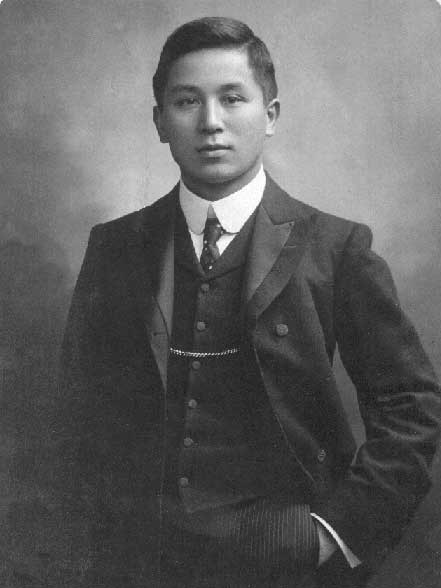
- Ah Ket c.1910
- Born: June 20, 1876; Wangaratta, Victoria
- Died: August 6, 1936 (aged 60)
- Occupation: Barrister
- Relatives: John Williams (grandson)

William Ah Ket (麥錫祥, 20 June 1876 – 6 August 1936) was a noted Australian barrister.

== Life ==
With paternal ancestry from Taishan, southern China, Ah Ket was Australia's first barrister of Asian heritage or ethnicity. He was born on 20 June 1876 at Wangaratta, Victoria, the only son and fifth child of Mah Ket and Hing Ung. He was an alumnus of the University of Melbourne.

On 16 November 1912, he married Gertrude Victoria Bullock at the Kew Methodist Church. They had two sons (William and Stanley) and two daughters (Melaan and Toylaan). He died on 6 August 1936 of arteriosclerosis and renal failure at Malvern, Victoria. His daughter Melaan was the mother of the guitarist John Williams.

Ah Ket fought against the requirements of the 1907 Factories (Employment of Chinese) Act, which discriminated against Chinese residents, and successfully opposed legislative amendments in 1904, 1905, and 1907 which would have specifically discriminated against Chinese residents in the furniture industry.

He was a co-founder of the Australian-Chinese Association and one of two delegates from the Chinese community in Australia to the opening of the Chinese national parliament of 1912. In 1913–14 and 1917, he acted as Consul-General for China in Melbourne.
