= Joseph Jordens =

Belgian-born Indologist (1925–2008)

Joseph ('Jos') Teresa Florent Jordens (1925-2008) was a Belgian-born Indologist, based in Australia for most of his career.

Jordens entered the Jesuit Order (1943). In 1952, he earned a doctorate from the University of Louvain, writing his dissertation on the Bhagavad Gita under Étienne Lamotte. He then taught Sanskrit at a Jesuit College in India, before deciding to pursue a career in Australia, first teaching at Melbourne Church of England Grammar School and Scotch College before an appointment to the University of Melbourne made him "in effect, founder of the first Department of Indian Studies at an Australian university." He joined the ANU in 1970, and he was elected fellow of the Australian Academy of the Humanities in 1984, and was named an Officer of the Order of Leopold, (2001). An expert on Dayānanda Sarasvatī as well as Gandhi, his best-known book is perhaps Gandhi's Religion - A Homespun Shawl.

He retired in 1990, delivering a valedictory lecture on Gandhi, and died in Red Hill, Australian Capital Territory.
