= Adrian Vickers =

Australian author, historian, sociologist

Adrian Vickers FAHA (b. 1958 in Tamworth) is an Australian author, historian and emeritus professor of Southeast Asian Studies at the University of Sydney. He writes a blog on Indonesian subjects. He has studied and documented Gambuh dance traditions, Panji (prince) stories, and other Indonesian art and cultural subjects as well as historiography and colonialism. He has a BA and PhD from the University of Sydney, is the Professor of Southeast Asian Studies (Personal Chair) and Director of the Asian Studies Program. Vickers' most recent book, The Pearl Frontier, co-written with Julia Martínez, won the University of Southern Queensland History Book Award at the 2016 Queensland Literary Awards. He is a fellow of the Australian Academy of the Humanities.

== Publications ==
- Vickers (1982). "A Balinese illustrated manuscript of the Siwaratrikalpa" (PDF). Bijdragen tot de Taal-, Land- en Volkenkunde. 138 (4): 443–469. doi:10.1163/22134379-90003463. Archived from the original on 13 February 2020.
- Vickers (1986). The Desiring Prince; A Study of the Kidung Malat as Text (PhD thesis, 2 vol.). University of Sydney.
- Vickers (1989). Bali, A Paradise Created. Singapore: Periplus. ISBN 978-1-4629-0008-4. OCLC 728479921.
- Vickers (1990). "Sights of Klungkung; Bali's most illustrious kingdom". In Oey, Eric (ed.). Bali, Island of the Gods. Singapore: Periplus. pp. 166–167.
- Vickers (May 1990). "Balinese texts and historiography". History and Theory. 29 (2): 158–178. doi:10.2307/2505223. JSTOR 2505223.
- Vickers (2013) [2005]. A History of Modern Indonesia. Cambridge University Press. ISBN 978-1-139-44761-4.
- Vickers (2005). Journeys of desire: a study of the Balinese text Malat. Leiden: KITLV. ISBN 9789067181372. OCLC 905444986.
- Vickers; Prasetyo, Arif B.; Trisila, Slamat (2009). Peradaban pesisir: menuju sejarah budaya Asia Tenggara [Coastal Civilisation: Towards a Cultural History of Southeast Asia]. Denpasar: Pustaka Larasan / Udayana University Press. ISBN 978-979-3790-35-0. OCLC 697333735.
- Vickers (2012). Balinese Art: Paintings and Drawings of Bali 1800 - 2010. Tokyo: Tuttle Pub. ISBN 978-1-4629-0998-8.
- Martínez, Julia; Vickers (2015). The Pearl Frontier: Indonesian Labour and Indigenous Encounters in Australia's Northern Trading Network. University of Hawaii Press. ISBN 978-0-8248-4002-0. OCLC 1101920398.

See also 108 articles online in Google Scholar.
