= Liu Ts'un-yan =

Chinese literary scholar

Liu Ts'un-yan AO FAHA 柳存仁 (pinyin Liu Cunren) (1917–2009) was a scholar of Chinese letters and thought, an author of fiction, drama, and screenplays, and a major figure in the development of Asian Studies in Australia.

== Life ==
Born in Shandong, he began studies at Peking University in 1935, and later worked for the Hong Kong government. In 1962 he took up an appointment at the Australian National University, becoming a professor in 1966, succeeding Göran Malmqvist. His students there included John Minford . He was a Foundation Fellow of the Australian Academy of the Humanities, was named an Officer of the Order of Australia and received " honorary or visiting fellowships in Hong Kong, Singapore, Malaysia, Tokyo, Paris, Columbia and Harvard, he was a regular guest and leading speaker at conferences in Taiwan and the People’s Republic of China, while beside his honorary degree from ANU he held similar awards from Hong Kong, Korea and Murdoch in Western Australia."

A scholar of Taoism, Buddhism, philology, history and classical fiction, Rafe de Crespigny wrote that "Liu Ts’un‑yan was one of the finest representatives of a very special group of Chinese scholars, superbly trained and skilled in Classical scholarship but with an equal command of modern literature, and with great ability in Confucian, Taoist and Buddhist philosophy and religion. At the same time, he belonged to the generation of the early twentieth century which received Western ideas and blended them to create a new approach to the study of China."

His colleague Pierre Ryckmans wrote that his "scholarly works form a monumental collection, covering fields as diverse a philosophy, literature and history, it is worth noting that, in his early years, he also wrote theatrical plays—even movie scripts—and one big novel."

At Liu's death, Minford described him as a "most meticulous scholar and teacher, able to rise to the demands of the most exacting textual scholarship, at home in the most arcane byways of the Confucian, Taoist and Buddhist classics. His scholarship was founded not on ideology or theory, but on close, indefatigable reading of central texts. He was a painstaking bibliographer, making copious notes wherever he went, at libraries all over the world. And yet behind this scholarly (and sometimes daunting) persona, was a man of great humanity and warmth, a playful man of letters, a witty essayist (again in both classical and colloquial Chinese), a fluent novelist and playwright."
