= Geremie Barmé =

Australian sinologist (born 1954)

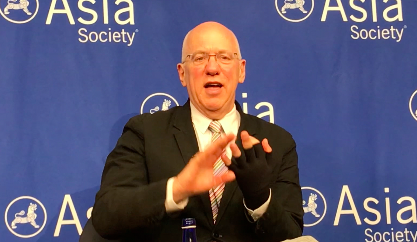
- Born: 4 May 1954 (age 72)
- Awards: Joseph Levenson Book Prize

Academic background
- Education: Australian National University

Academic work
- Discipline: Sinology
- Institutions: Australian Centre on China in the World; Australian National University
- Notable works: The Gate of Heavenly Peace; Morning Sun; An Artistic Exile: A Life of Feng Zikai

Geremie R. Barmé (born 1954) is an Australian sinologist and film-maker on modern and traditional China. He was formerly Director, Australian Centre on China in the World and Chair Professor of Chinese History at Australian National University College of Asia and the Pacific in Canberra.

His films include The Gate of Heavenly Peace (1995), which depicts the spring of 1989 in China leading up to the events of June Fourth, and Morning Sun, on the Cultural Revolution.

His book An Artistic Exile: A Life of Feng Zikai was awarded the Joseph Levenson Book Prize for Modern China, 2004. He was editor of the ANU based e-journal China Heritage Quarterlyfrom 2005 to 2012, and is the editor of China Heritage. In 2016, he founded The Wairarapa Academy for New Sinology in collaboration with sinologist John Minford.

== Education and career ==
Barmé took his B.A. Asian Studies from the Australian National University, majoring in Chinese and Sanskrit, then studied at universities in the People's Republic of China (1974–77) and Japan (1980–83).

When he first returned to Australia as a lecturer in history, one of his first students was future Australian Prime Minister Kevin Rudd, whose support was important in funding the Centre for China in the World. He edited the journal East Asian History from 1991 to 2007

In 2011, he gave the inaugural "China in the World" Invited Lecture at ANU, "Australia and China in the World: Whose Literacy?"

== New Sinology ==
In an essay first published in 2005, Barmé called for a "New Sinology," which would be

descriptive of a "robust engagement with contemporary China" and indeed with the Sinophone world in all of its complexity, be it local, regional or global. It affirms a conversation and intermingling that also emphasizes strong scholastic underpinnings in both the classical and modern Chinese language and studies, at the same time as encouraging an ecumenical attitude in relation to a rich variety of approaches and disciplines, whether they be mainly empirical or more theoretically inflected. In seeking to emphasize innovation within Sinology by recourse to the word 'new', it is nonetheless evident that I continue to affirm the distinctiveness of Sinology as a mode of intellectual inquiry.

The historian Arif Dirlik is among those who welcomed Barmé's intervention as "an important reminder of the importance of language as the defining feature of the term."

== Selected major publications ==
- ——; Minford, John (1988). Seeds of Fire: Chinese Voices of Conscience. New York: Hill and Wang. ISBN 0809085216.
- ——; Jaivin, Linda (1992). New Ghosts, Old Dreams: Chinese Rebel Voices. New York: Times Books. ISBN 0812919270.
- ——; Gordon, Richard; Carma Hinton; Peter Kovler; Orville Schell; Lise Yasui & John Crowley (1995). The Gate of Heavenly Peace: 天安门. Long Bow Group.
- —— (1996). Shades of Mao the Posthumous Cult of the Great Leader. Armonk, NY: M.E. Sharpe. ISBN 0585269017.
- —— (1999). In the Red: On Contemporary Chinese Culture. New York: Columbia University Press. ISBN 0231106149.
- —— (2002). An Artistic Exile: A Life of Feng Zikai (1898-1975). Berkeley: University of California Press. ISBN 0520208323.
- —— (2012). "New Sinology". China Heritage Project; Reprinted from Chinese Studies Association of Australia Newsletter, No. 3, May 2005. Archived from the original on 11 August 2019.
- —— (2008). The Forbidden City. Cambridge, Mass.: Harvard University Press. p. 1. ISBN 9780674027794.
- —— (2010), "For Truly Great Men, Look to This Age Alone —Was Mao Zedong a New Emperor?", in Cheek, Timothy (ed.), Cambridge Companion to Mao, Cambridge: Cambridge Univ Press, pp. 243–272
