= John Minford =

British sinologist and literary translator

- Born: 22 June 1946 (age 80); Birmingham, UK
- Known for: translations of Chinese classics

Academic background
- Education: Australian National University
- Doctoral advisor: Pierre Ryckmans; Liu Ts'un-yan

Academic work
- Discipline: sinology
- Institutions: Chinese University of Hong Kong; University of Auckland; Australian National University; Hong Kong Polytechnic University; Open University of Hong Kong; Hang Seng University of Hong Kong

John Minford (born 22 June 1946) is a British sinologist and literary translator. He is primarily known for his translation of Chinese classics such as 40 chapters of The Story of the Stone, The Art of War, the I Ching and the Tao Te Ching. He has also translated Louis Cha's wuxia novel The Deer and the Cauldron (highly abridged in 28 chapters) and a selection of Pu Songling's Strange Tales from a Chinese Studio.

== Life ==
=== Early years and education ===
John Minford was born in Birmingham, UK, in 1946. The son of a career diplomat, Leslie Mackay Minford, he grew up in Venezuela, Argentina and Egypt, before attending Horris Hill School, Newbury, Berkshire, and then Winchester College (1958–1963), where he studied Ancient Greek and Latin literature. He is the younger brother of prominent economist Patrick Minford. At Winchester he took piano lessons with Christopher Cowan. In 1963-4, he continued his piano studies with Walter Kamper in Vienna, and from 1964 to 1966 with David Parkhouse in London. He entered Balliol College, Oxford, in 1964 on a classical scholarship and obtained first class honours in Chinese Literature in 1968. He completed his PhD at the Australian National University in 1980, under the supervision of Dr. Pierre Ryckmans and Professor Liu Ts'un-yan.

=== Career ===
He has held a number of teaching posts in mainland China, Hong Kong, Australia and New Zealand. In 1982, he joined the staff of the Research Centre for Translation at the Chinese University of Hong Kong, working closely with Stephen Soong (宋淇) and eventually taking over from him as editor of the journal Renditions. His later positions included Chair Professor of Chinese at the University of Auckland (1986–1991) and at the Australian National University (2006–2016), and Chair Professor of Translation at the Hong Kong Polytechnic University (1994–1999) and at the Chinese University of Hong Kong (2011–2013). In 2006, during his tenure as Dean of Arts and Social Sciences at the Open University of Hong Kong, he was one of the founding members of the Civic Party of Hong Kong. He is currently Emeritus Professor of Chinese at the Australian National University, and Sin Wai Kin Distinguished Professor of Chinese Culture and Translation at the Hang Seng University of Hong Kong. In November 2016, he was awarded the inaugural Medal for Excellence in Translation by the Australian Academy of the Humanities, for his version of the I Ching. For several years he divided his time between Featherston, New Zealand, and Fontmarty, his old home near Tuchan, in the Corbières hills of the Languedoc. He now lives in Devon in the United Kingdom, and is currently Honorary Senior Research Fellow at the Global China Centre of Exeter University.

In 2020-21, he finished editing a series of six titles from Hong Kong Literature for publication by the Chinese University Press of Hong Kong. This series consists of Liu Yichang's stream-of-consciousness novel The Drunkard, two volumes of selected poetry and fiction by P. K. Leung (Lotus Leaves and Dragons), Xi Xi's contemporary book of biji sketches The Teddy Bear Chronicles, the personal memoir Ordinary Days by Leo Ou-fan Lee and Esther Lee, and a compendium of Hong Kong essays from 1840 to the present, The Best China.

=== Marriages ===
Minford was married in 1969 to Nickie Curteis, and they had two children, Emma and Luke. Nickie died in 1973. In 1977 he married Rachel May, the daughter of the noted sinologist David Hawkes. They had two children, Daniel and Laura. Rachel died in January 2015. David Hawkes was also Minford's teacher at Oxford. Together, the two translated Cao Xueqin's The Story of the Stone, with Hawkes translating the first eighty chapters (volumes 1–3) and Minford the last forty (volumes 4–5).

== Main publications ==
- 1980 Miao Yüeh 繆鉞, The Chinese Lyric 論詞, in Soong ed., Song Without Music: Chinese Tz’u Poetry, Hong Kong, Chinese UP, 25–44
- 1982 Cao Xueqin 曹雪芹 & Gao E 高鶚, The Story of the Stone 紅樓夢, vol 4, The Debt of Tears. Penguin Classics & Indiana University Press, 400 pp.
- 1982 (assistant editor, for Liu Ts'un-yan柳存仁) ‘Chinese Middlebrow Fiction’, a Renditions book, Washington University Press.
- 1984 (edited with Stephen C. Soong 宋淇) Trees on the Mountain: An Anthology of New Chinese Writing, Chinese University Press, Hong Kong, 396 pp.
- 1986 (edited with Geremie Barmé) Seeds of Fire: Chinese Voices of Conscience 火種, Far Eastern Economic Review, Hong Kong, 347 pp.
- 1986 Cao Xueqin & Gao E, The Story of the Stone 紅樓夢, vol 5, The Dreamer Wakes. Penguin Classics & Indiana University Press, 385 pp.
- 1987 (edited, with Siu-kit Wong) Chinese: Classical, Modern and Humane – Collected Essays of David Hawkes, Hong Kong, Chinese University Press, 327 pp.
- 1987 (with Pang Bingjun & Séan Golden) One Hundred Modern Chinese Poems 中國現代詩一百首. Commercial Press, Hong Kong, 348 pp.
- 1995 Pieces of Eight: Reflections on Translating The Story of the Stone, in Eoyang and Lin eds., Translating Chinese Literature, Indiana University Press, 178–203.
- 1997 Louis Cha (Jin Yong 金庸), The Deer and the Cauldron: A Martial Arts Novel 鹿鼎記, The First Book. Oxford University Press, Hong Kong, xxxiii & 475 pp.
- 1998 The Chinese Garden: Death of a Symbol, in Studies in the History of Gardens and Designed Landscapes (vol 18, no. 3), 257–268.
- 1999 Death in Macau: In Defence of Orientalism, in Günter Wohlfart et al. eds., Translation und Interpretation, Munich, Wilhelm Fink, 143–156.
- 1999 Louis Cha (Jin Yong 金庸), The Deer and the Cauldron: A Martial Arts Novel, The Second Book. Oxford University Press, Hong Kong, xxxi & 564 pp.
- 2000 (edited, with Joseph S.M.Lau) Chinese Classical Literature: An Anthology of Translations. 1st vol, New York & Hong Kong, Columbia UP & Chinese UP, lix & 1176 pp. 2nd vol, forthcoming.
- 2002 Sunzi, The Art of War 孫子兵法. New York, Viking Books. Lvi & 325 pp. (subsequent paperback, Penguin Classics, 2003)
- 2002 Louis Cha (Jin Yong 金庸), The Deer and the Cauldron: A Martial Arts Novel, The Third Book. Oxford University Press, Hong Kong, xlix & 535 pp. With Rachel May
- 2003 (edited with Rachel May) A Birthday Book for Brother Stone: For David Hawkes at Eighty. Chinese University Press, xi & 365 pp.
- 2005 Soong Hsun-leng 宋訓倫, The Fragrant Hermitage 馨菴詞稿. Twenty-nine Lyric Poems, translated from the Chinese, Taiwan, SKS. 5–86.
- 2006 Pu Songling 蒲松齡, Strange Tales from a Chinese Studio 聊齋誌異, London, Penguin Classics, xxxviii + 562 pp. (translations with introduction, glossary, endnotes and bibliography)
- 2007 (with Brian Holton and Agnes Hung-chong Chan) Leung Ping-kwan, Islands and Continents. Hong Kong University Press, xviii and 128 pp.
- 2008 'One Moon One Heart:Thirty Ancient Chinese Fables' (Monte James Fine Art, San Francisco)
- 2014 The I Ching: Book of Change 周易: A New Translation, New York, Viking/Penguin.
- 2018 Laozi, Daodejing 道德經: A New Translation New York, Viking/Penguin.
- 2020-2021 General Editor, 6-volume series, Hong Kong Literature, CUHK Press, Hong Kong.

Forthcoming 2026: Ch'ing 情: A Chinese Book of Love (Reaktion Books, London). Seria Ludens: Playing with Serious Things. Collected Essays, Translations and Memoirs (Hong Kong University Press). with Julia Lovell, The Penguin Book of Chinese Short Stories (Penguin, London) 2027-9 Two volume selection of the poetry of 蒲松齡 for the Hsu-Tang Bilingual Chinese Classics series, OUP (New York).
