= Trinh Hoanh =

Cambodian intellectual and politician

- ទ្រីញ វ៉ាញ
- Born: September 9, 1924; Trapeang Russei, Kampong Svay district, Kampong Thom province, French Indochina
- Died: 1975 (aged 50–51); Khmer Republic
- Occupations: Politician, intellectual
- Spouse: Neang Mar Mongkre
- Children: 10

Trinh Hoanh (Khmer: ទ្រីញ វ៉ាញ) was a major Cambodian intellectual and right-wing politician of the mid-20th century who served as Minister of Information and was president of the Khmer Writers Association, until he was assassinated by the Khmer Rouge in April 1975.

== Biography ==
=== A promising young man from Kampong Thom ===
Trinh Hoanh was born on 9 September 1924 in Trapeang Russei of Kampong Svay district in the province of Kampong Thom. His father Trinh Bac and his mother Neang Suy Huoi were both of Sino-Khmer background. He was married on 15 November 1945 to Neang Mar Mongkre and together they had 11 children.

Trinh Hoang went to the École Normale to become a teacher. In September 1943, he taught his first day of school and in 1947, he was appointed as the local inspector of public schools in Cheung Prey district. He was promoted as Chief of Office of the Minister of Information in 1952 and secretary of the Ministry in 1954. During that time, he also began writing his first novel in Khmer: Kyoum Mean Tose Pruoh Avey (ខ្ញុំមានទោសព្រោះអ្វី, "Why do you accuse me?").

=== An intellectual representing the people during the Sangkum ===
Trinh Hoanh rose to prominence during the Sangkum era. During this period of political changes and social unrest, he was the only politician who won during every parliamentary election in 1955, 1958, 1962 and 1966. He was first elected as a candidate in the precinct of Wat Moha Leap from the Koh Sotin district in Kampong Cham Province in September 1955. On October 1, he was chosen to be the Quaestor in charge of current affairs at the Parliament. The same year, he founded a Khmer journal known as Cheam Khmer ("Khmer Blood") and a French-language weekly magazine known as Réalités cambodgiennes. He was promoted as Secretary of State for Information and Religion in the second cabinet of the Sangkum from January 6 to 1 March 1956 under the presidency of Oum Chheang Sun. He continued in that position under the 3rd and the 4th cabinet of the Sangkum under Norodom Sihanouk and Khim Tit until 15 September 1956. He was again Secretary of State for Information under the 18th Cabinet of the Sangkum from August 7 to 6 October 1962 under Chau Sen Cocsal and Under-Secretary of State for Information in the 21st Cabinet of the Sangkum from 8 May 1965 to 24 October 1966 under the presidency of Norodom Kantol.

He was called upon to represent Cambodia on various missions such as the anniversary of the October Revolution in Russia in 1957.

In 1958, he integrated the Khmer Writers Association and became president of the group in 1964.

=== Role in the 1970 coup and the Khmer Republic ===
Trinh Hoanh is considered to have been instrumental in turning the National Assembly of Cambodia against Prince Sihanouk in a mounting crisis which led to the coup of 1970. Charles Meyer, the French senior adviser to the Prince, was aware of his influence and it came to no surprise to him when Chhang Song, who was to become Minister of Information in the Lon Nol-led Khmer Republic, heard these words from Trinh Hoanh at 2 p.m. on March 18, 1970: “I hereby withdraw my confidence from Samdech Head of State.” The National Assembly, in a unanimous decision, then voted to withdraw confidence from Prince Sihanouk and empowered House Speaker Cheng Heng as head of state. As he and other such as In Tam ensured a certain continuity between the Sangkum and the Khmer Republic, he also hoped that the new leadership would be "rededicated to its original purpose of fighting injustice, corruption, oppression, and treason and that this organization [the Sangkum] should never again be prostituted as an instrument of despotic rule."

While Norodom Sihanouk let a government in exile from Beijing, Trinh Hoanh was also instrumental in legitimizing the Khmer Republic as the "real government" which was in urgent need for financial help and military support.

In the newly founded Khmer Republic, Trinh Hoanh became Minister of Information from 19 March 1970 to 21 April 1971 and later Minister for Information and Tourism from 26 December 1973 to 13 June 1973 under Long Boret who like him was an author of romance stories. During that time, he founded a new periodical known as Cambodge nouveau ("The New Cambodia"). Trinh Hoanh increased the propaganda budget of the Ministry to propagate the anti-Vietnamese sentiment among the population. Under his watch, the main avenues in Phnom Penh were decorated with propaganda stating, “The Vietcong is worse than cholera.”

On 12 January 1974, Trinh Hoanh rejected the peace proposal of former Prime Minister Son Sann who suggested the departure of Lon Nol to restore national unity in Cambodia. Until the end, Trinh Hoanh refused any compromise with Norodom Sihanouk which he considered as a traitor. The US Embassy in Phnom Penh considered him to be "effective and energetic" but lamented the fact that he had "an unprepossessing appearance and a reputation for corruption".

=== Assassination of the leading Cambodian intellectual ===
As the Khmer Rouge entered Phnom Penh in April 1975, Trinh Hoanh was among the first people assassinated both as a politician and as an intellectual. He was executed close to the Faculty of Law where he was seen tied up with other top Lon Nol officials.

== Legacy: the intellectual martyrdom of Cambodia ==
Trinh Hoanh was part of a generation of Khmer intellectuals with his friend Ly Theam Teng who contributed to the cultural renaissance of Cambodia after the Independence, which saw the publications of tens of novels and the creation of the new journals in Khmer language, bringing the intellectual life of Cambodia to a level it has not experienced before. His assassination, if it may have been carried out for political reasons, made him the unfortunate forerunner of a tragic trend to exterminate all the intellectuals in Cambodia, which included anybody that would have worn glasses. As such, as Cambodia struggles to restore its intellectual life, the legacy of Trinh Hoanh is received in the form of a certain intellectual martyrdom and a sign of the ordeal of the Khmer intelligentsia which is yet to be born again from its ashes.
