= Medal for Excellence in Translation =

Australian literary award for translation

- Awarded for: English-language literary translation
- Sponsored by: Australian Academy of the Humanities
- Website: humanities.org.au/grants-and-awards/medal-for-excellence-in-translation/

The Medal for Excellence in Translation is a biannual literary award presented by the Australian Academy of the Humanities "for a book-length translation into English of a work of any genre (including scholarship), from any language and period" by an Australian or permanent resident.

== Winners ==
Medal for Excellence in Translation recipients
Year	Translator	Work	Result	Ref.
2016	John Minford	I Ching: The Book of Change	Winner	
2016	Stuart Robson	The Old Javanese Rāmāyana: A New English Translation with an Introduction and Notes	Shortlist	
2016	Phoebe Weston-Evans	Paris Nocturne, by Patrick Modiano	Shortlist	
2018	Julie Rose	Simon Leys: Navigator Between Worlds, by Philippe Paquet	Winner	
2018	David Holm	Hanvueng: The Goose King and the Ancestral King, An Epic from Guangxi in Southern China	Shortlist	
2018	Geoff Wilkes	The Greater Hope, by Ilse Aichinger	Shortlist	
2020	Penny Hueston	Being Here: The Life of Paula Modersohn-Becker, by Marie Darrieussecq	Winner	
2020	Paul Gibbard	The Dream, by Émile Zola	Shortlist	
2020	Omid Tofighian	No Friend But the Mountains: Writing from Manus Prison, by Behrouz Boochani	Shortlist	
2022	Robert Savage	Maria Theresa: The Habsburg Empress in Her Time, by Barbara Stollberg-Rilinger	Winner	
2022	Alex Skovron and Josef Tomáš	Elegies, by Jiří Orten	Shortlist	
2022	McComas Taylor	The Viṣṇu Purāṇa: Ancient Annals of the God with Lotus Eyes	Shortlist	
2024	Stephanie Smee	On the Line: Notes from a Factory, by Joseph Ponthus	Winner	
2024	Josh Stenberg	For a Splendid Sunny Apocalypse, by Jiang Tao	Shortlist	
2024	Kevin Windle and Elena Govor	Voices in the Wilderness: A Digest of the Russian-language Press in Australia 1912–1919	Shortlist	
2026	Simon Luke Robinson Burke	The Principles of Religion, by Rabban Daniel Ibn al-Ḥaṭṭāb	Winner	
2026	Tomoko Aoyama & Penny Bailey	The Stripper Goddess of Japan: The Life and Afterlives of Ame no Uzume, by Tsurumi Shunsuke	Shortlist	
2026	Jesper Gulddal	The Labyrinth, by Jens Baggesen	Shortlist	
