= Khuon Sokhamphu =

Cambodian linguist and phonetics scholar

- Born: November 27, 1931; Kampot Province
- Died: 1975
- Occupation: Writer
- Writing career
- Language: Khmer, French and German
- Notable work: Le système phonétique de la langue khmère

Khuon Sokhampu was a Cambodian linguist and phonetics scholar, who was among the many intellectuals who were exterminated by the Khmer Rouge regime. Along with Iv Koeus and Keng Vannsak, Khuon Sokhamphu was one of the three pioneers of Khmer linguistics and grammar.

== Biography ==
=== Youth and education in Kampot ===
Khuon Sokhampu was born on November 27, 1931, in Sangkat Touk Meas, Banteay Meas District, in Kampot Province. His father's name was Yuon Hung, and his mother's name was Nget Nheb. Khuon Sokhampu started primary school in his hometown and studied until obtaining his baccalauréat in high school.

=== Joining the intellectual elite in Phnom Penh ===
Khuon Sokhampu married Nam Soun Sunny in the early 1950s. In 1956, he co-published his first history of Khmer literature. In 1960, Khuon Sokhampu passed the entrance exam for the Phnom Penh Pedagogical Institute and completed two years of teaching at the Lycée Descartes. As a teacher in this prestigious call, he started having good relationships with the Cambodian intellectual elite.

=== Studying linguistics in East Berlin ===
In 1962, he was appointed Professor of Khmer at the University of Humboldt in East Germany. At that time during the Sangkum era, Prince Sihanouk was trying to maintain a neutral policy of non-alignment in the context of the Cold War. Cambodia did not yet have a diplomat in Berlin, therefore Khuon Sokhampu acted as both a professor of the Khmer language and a representative of the Cambodian government in overseeing Cambodian students who had received scholarships from the German government to study in the socialist country. While working in East Berlin, German government studied general linguistics at Humboldt University until obtaining his doctorate on the phonetics of the Khmer language, before returning home to Cambodia in late 1969. However, as Cambodian flipped from neutrality to American ally under the Khmer Republic, his diplomas from a socialist country were not fully recognized. He became a member of the Khmer Writers Association on May 24, 1962.

=== Leading research in Khmer phonetics at the Royal University of Phnom Penh ===
Khuon Sokhampu was a close student of Chuon Nath, and his used the weekly radio talk shows of the latter as the raw material for his study of the phonetics of the Phnom Penh dialect. In 1971, the National Institute of Languages and Civilizations of the East of Paris appointed him as assistant professor in the Khmer language, but due to the dramatic political situation, the government of the Republic of Cambodia did not allow him to travel abroad. He was then appointed as a Professor of Higher Education by the Ministry of National Education and continued to work as a Professor of Linguistics and director of the Linguistics Research Institute of the Faculty of Arts and Human Sciences at the Royal University of Phnom Penh until 1975. He delved into the study of Khmer literature and published a in-depth study of the newly emerged Khmer novel, in 1972, establishing a list of all Khmer novels since the pioneering work of Rim Kin, which he presented at a research conference at the Sorbonne in Paris in July 1973.

=== Last trip and extermination under the Khmer Rouge terror ===
From January 13 to January 17, Kuon Sokhampu travelled to Bangkok to join a workshop in linguistics organized by the Siam Society, in what seems to have been his last trip abroad. Along with all his family, Khuon Sokhampu was executed under the Khmer Rouge as part of their anti-intellectual persecution in unknown circumstances and his contribution to Khmer linguistics has since "fallen into obscurity".

== Legacy ==
Building on the works of non-Cambodian experts of Khmer linguistics such as Judith Jacob, Khuon Sokhampuk was the first Cambodian to focus his work on Khmer linguistics and established the case for a rich diversity in Khmer dialects. His work in the field of Khmer phonetics is, according to Khmer linguist Jean-Michel Filippi, a "great work of description which does not yet have its equivalent for contemporary Khmer".

In 1963, he published a critical pedagogical curriculum in which he promoted the joint study of Khmer literature in connection to Khmer civilisation, which helps understand the development of Khmer literature during the Sangkum, as illustrated by the novel A New Sun Rises Over the Old Land.

His work in Khmer phonetics was continued by the next generation of Khmer scholars led by Saveros Pou.

== Bibliography ==
- Khuon Sokhamphu, Le roman khmer contemporain, Phnom Penh, Faculty of Literature, 1972, 56 pages.
- " ពាក្យរង្វាល់ “ថ្ល្វង៑” និង “ទ្នាល៑” ក្នុងភាសាខ្មែរបុរាណ និងកម្លាយរបស់ពា្យទាំងពីរនេះក្នុងភាសាខ្មែរទំនើប " [Bāky raṅvāl’ “thlvaṅ‧” niṅ “dnāl‧” knuṅ bhāsā khmaer purāṇ niṅ kamlāy rapas’ baky dāṃṅ bīr neḥ knuṅ bhāsā khmaer daṃnoep] [Volume measures thlvaṅ and dnāl in ancient Khmer and the evolution of these two terms in modern Khmer], [in] Khing Hoc Dy (éd.), កម្រងអត្ថបទខេមរសិក្សាឧទ្ទិសជូនបណ្ឌិតសភាចារ្យ ឃឹន សុខ សាស្ត្រាចារ្យបណ្ឌិត ឃួន សុខម្ភូ បណ្ឌិតសភាចារ្យ ឡុង សៀម (ប្រមូលចងក្រង និងរៀបចំបោះពុម្ព ដោយបណ្ឌិតសភាចារ្យ ឃីង ហុកឌី), Mélange of Khmer studies in homage to Prof. Drs Khin Sok, Khuon Sokhamphu and Long Seam, Phnom Penh, Angkor Editions, 2013 : 38-66. (in Khmer)
