= Huỳnh Sanh Thông =

Vietnamese American scholar and translator

- Born: July 15, 1926. Hóc Môn, Sài Gòn, French Cochinchina, French Indochina
- Died: November 17, 2008 (aged 82); Hamden, Connecticut, U.S.
- Citizenship: American
- Education: Lycée Petrus Trương Vĩnh Ký, Sài Gòn, Vietnam
- Alma mater: Ohio University, Yale University
- Occupations: translator, teacher, author, publisher, editor
- Spouse: Huỳnh Thị Vân Yền (1954–2008)
- Children: Vân-Thi Huỳnh, Thanh Huỳnh, Tùng Huỳnh
- Writing career
- Language: English
- Period: 1960–1999
- Subjects: poetry in translation, Vietnamese studies, anthropology
- Notable works: translations of The Tale of Kiều (1973) and Nguyễn Chí Thiện's poetry collection Flowers from Hell (1984)
- Notable awards: 1985 Poetry International Prize (Rotterdam), 1989 MacArthur Fellowship

Huỳnh Sanh Thông (Saigon, July 15, 1926 – November 15, 2008) was a Vietnamese American scholar and translator.

== Life ==
He was born to a rice-miller mother (Lâm Thị Kén) and a Francophile primary schoolteacher father (Huỳnh Sanh Thinh) in Hóc Môn, close to Sài Gòn (now Ho Chi Minh City). When the family moved into Sài Gòn itself, Thông enrolled at the prestigious Lycée Petrus Trương Vĩnh Ký where he studied French literature, specializing particularly in the works of Molière and La Fontaine.

In 1945, he joined the clandestine Vietnamese independence movement, opposed to the post-war re-establishment of French colonial rule in Vietnam. The following year, while working as a janitor at the US consulate, he was arrested by the French and held in a concentration camp outside Sài Gòn. Diplomatic pressure from the Americans resulted in his release, whereupon he fled to the United States as a political refugee, arriving in Athens, Ohio, in 1948.

He graduated in Economics at Ohio University in 1951, but was particularly interested in the issue of gender inequality, which he saw as a serious problem both in the US and in his native Vietnam. As he put it in 2008: "I looked for a way to explain the difference between how responsible women and irresponsible men were treated in society, as in my own family as well as in many others I could see."

He studied international relations and anthropology at the Universities of Georgetown and Cornell before starting work with Robert B. Jones on a Vietnamese primer that was eventually published as An Introduction to Spoken Vietnamese (1960).

For the month of May 1957, Thông was appointed by the US government as the official "Vietnamese welcomer" to Ngo Dinh Diem. Later that same year, he joined the staff of Yale University as a teacher of Vietnamese. He would remain associated with Yale for the rest of his life.

He died from sudden heart failure on November 17, 2008, at 82 years old.

== Works and awards ==
Thông is best known for his English translation of Nguyễn Du's Kim Vân Kiều, published as The Tale of Kiều (Yale University Press, 1973, reissued several times), and for An Anthology of Vietnamese Poems: From the Eleventh through the Twentieth Centuries (Yale).

His translation of Flowers from Hell by the Vietnamese dissident poet Nguyễn Chí Thiện won the 1985 prize at the Poetry International Festival in Rotterdam.

He also founded the Lac-Viet book series, publishing work by Vietnam scholars such as O. W. Wolters; and the journal Vietnam Forum (16 issues, 1983–1997).

In 1999, he self-published The Golden Serpent: How Humans Learned to Speak and Invent Culture.

He was awarded the Harry J. Benda Prize in Southeast Asia Studies in 1981, a MacArthur "Genius" Award in 1987, and the A.L. Becker Southeast Asian Literature in Translation Prize in 2012.
