= Wat Botum =

Buddhist temple in Phnom Penh, Cambodia

- វត្តបទុម
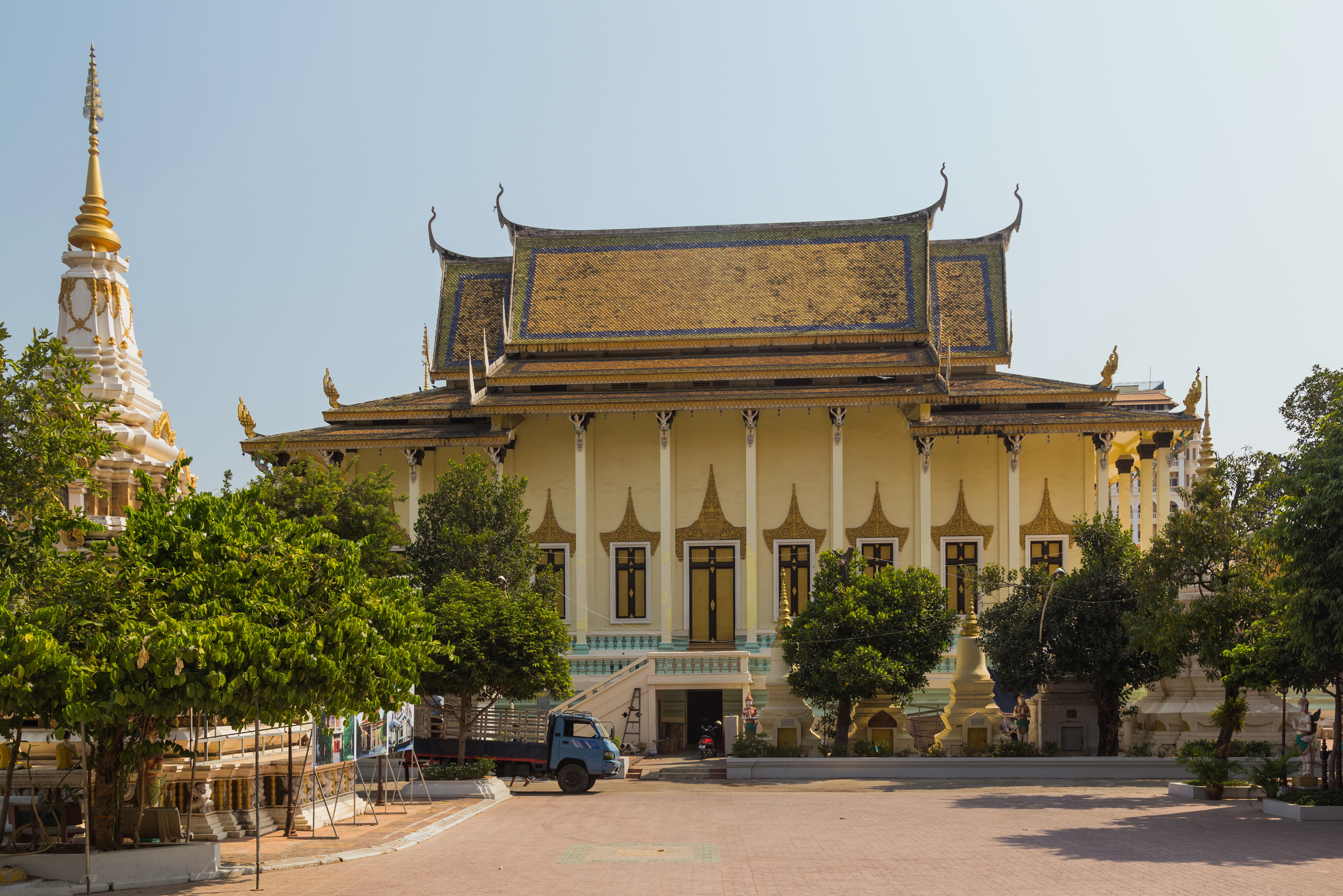
- The facade of Wat Botum

- Location within Cambodia

Religion
- Affiliation: Theravada Buddhism

Location
- Location: Oknha Suor Srun St. (7), Sangkat Chaktomuk, Daun Penh District, Phnom Penh
- Country: Cambodia
- Coordinates: 11°33′34″N 104°55′54″E

Architecture
- Founder: King Ponhea Yat
- Completed: 1442

Wat Botum (Khmer: វត្តបទុម, UNGEGN: Vôtt Bâtŭm, ALA-LC: Vatt Padum [ʋɔət ɓɑːtum]; lit. 'Temple of the Lotus Blossoms'), the official name is Wat Botum Vatey Reachavararam (Khmer: វត្តបទុមវតីរាជវរារាម) literally means "The temple of lotus which was built by the king", is a wat (pagoda) located on Phnom Penh, Cambodia. It is to the south of the Royal Palace on the western side of Wat Botum Park. Wat Botum is a Khmer Buddhist pagoda in Phnom Penh, built by King Ponhea Yat (1405-1467) in the 15th century, located south of the Royal Palace of Cambodia. This pagoda is one of the five oldest pagodas in Phnom Penh with ancient origins.

== Name ==
Wat Botum Watey is officially named Wat Botum Watey Reacheveraram. This temple is the former Khpob Ta Yang pagoda, Because this is the land of Ta Yang, he is a farmer. which is one of the five pagodas built by King Ponhea Yat in 1434. In 1865, King Norodom began to rebuild the temple of Wat Khpob Ta Yang, and he changed his name to Wat Botum Watey Reachveraram, which means "the temple of the king with a lotus flower as a fence." Today, this temple is abbreviated as Wat Botum Watey or Wat Botum.

== History ==
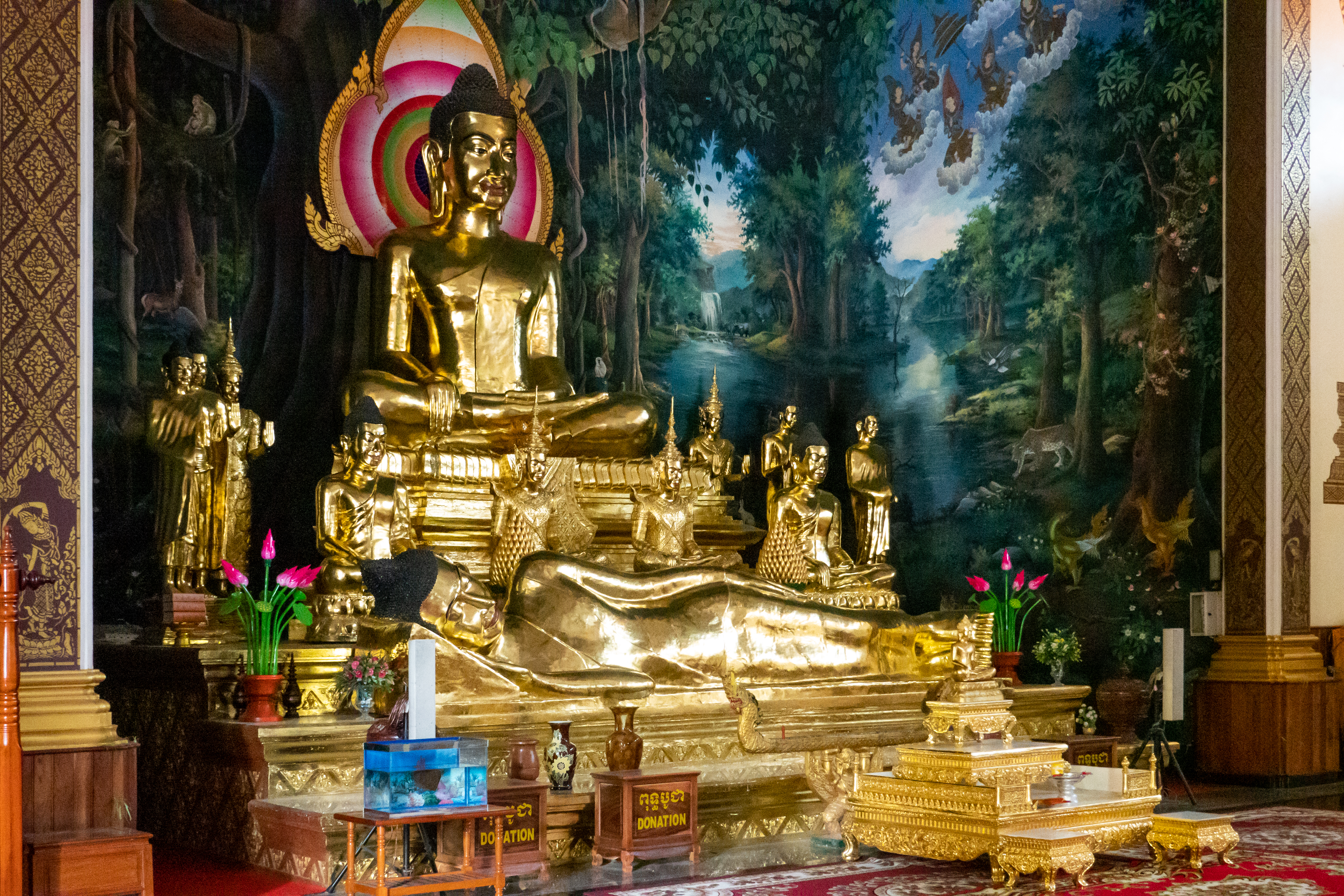

Established by King Ponhea Yat in 1442, Wat Botum is one of the most important and original pagodas in Phnom Penh. The wat was originally named Wat Khpop Ta Yang or Wat Tayawng Originally, it was called Wat Khpob Ta Yang because this is the land of Ta Yang, the plantation owner. and at the time of the construction of the Royal Palace in the 1860s, when it was assigned to the Cambodian branch of the Dhammayuttika Nikaya, it was renamed Botum Wathei by monk Kantie Topodae after a former lotus pond on the site. Numerous politician and eminent persons of the city are buried here. Also, many prominent Cambodian bhikkhus have been ordained at the wat. You Bo and the Khmer Writers' Association have their headquarters at the wat. Later, during the reign of Samdech Preah Sokun bat and later kings, Phnom Penh abandoned Phnom Penh to build a new city in Tuol Basan in 1508, and other places, Khpob Ta Yang pagoda, the construction was quiet until it became a pagoda. In the forest, not even a single monk lives and has been abandoned by the locals for hundreds of years, his name is known only in the royal genealogy, while the real location is a tabernacle with a leaf and a stone pillar. A boundary in a high hill forest nearby, from the east, has a small, long hut where Tayong digs water to irrigate his crops, and the locals often come to fetch this water to use. Until 1865, King Norodom abandoned Udong to build Phnom Penh for the second time. He ordered that timber be transported from Udong to build a temple on the hill. To the west of the pagoda, pour the soil, expand the hill and dig the old ditch deeper than before, and then plant lotus trees in the ditch of the three corners of the pagoda. The name from Wat Khpob Ta Yang to Wat Botum Vatey Reachvararam means the presence of the lotus as a fence, the best temple of the king forever. Later, in 1887, king Norodom received the Bodhisattva tree and the relics of the Buddha from Sri Lanka, and he celebrated the three-day ceremony to plant the Bodhisattva tree in front of Wat Botum Vatey Reachvararam. In 1909, during the reign of King Sisowath, Samdech Preah Mongkul Tepachary Eam celebrated the burial ceremony of the relics and relics at the upper level, while the relics of Samdech Preah Sokuntheathipady were buried at the lower level in the main stupa which was built by Samdech. 33 meters high, quadrangular in shape, south of the temple (called the 8-way stupa), there are small stupas accompanying all four corners, each 6 meters high, with towers on all four corners, highlighting the ornate design. In 1937, during the reign of King Sisowath Monivong, wat began to dismantle the old temple and build a new one.

== Location ==
Among the 4676 pagodas (as of 2014) and the many monuments that are revered by the Cambodian people, Wat Botum Vatey is one of the most sacred pagodas in the Kingdom of Cambodia with a related history. With the emergence of Phnom Penh. This pagoda is 260 meters long from west to east and 202 meters wide from north to south, located in Daun Penh section, Phnom Penh.

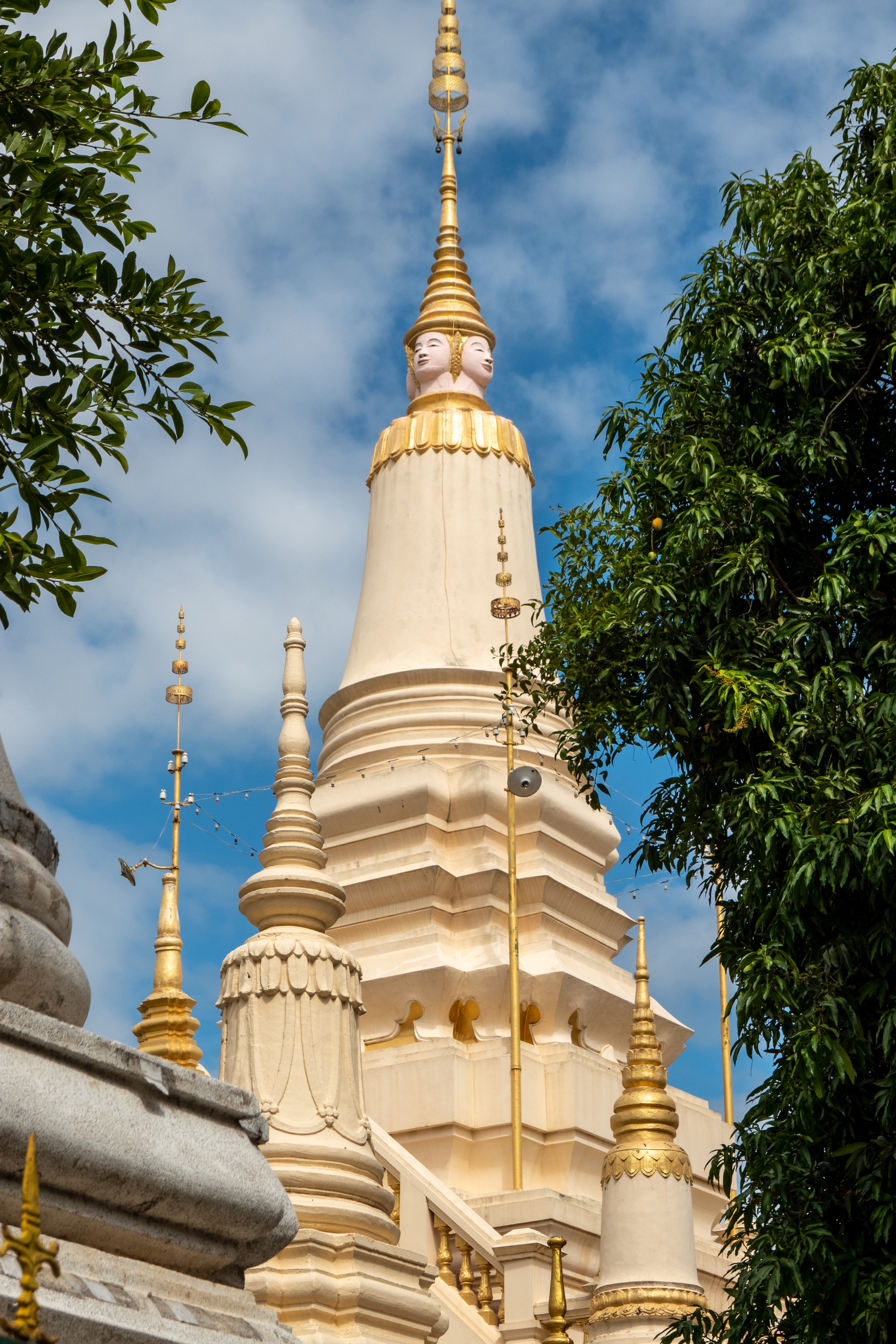
Wat Botum Watey Reacheveraram, Phnom Penh

== Photo ==
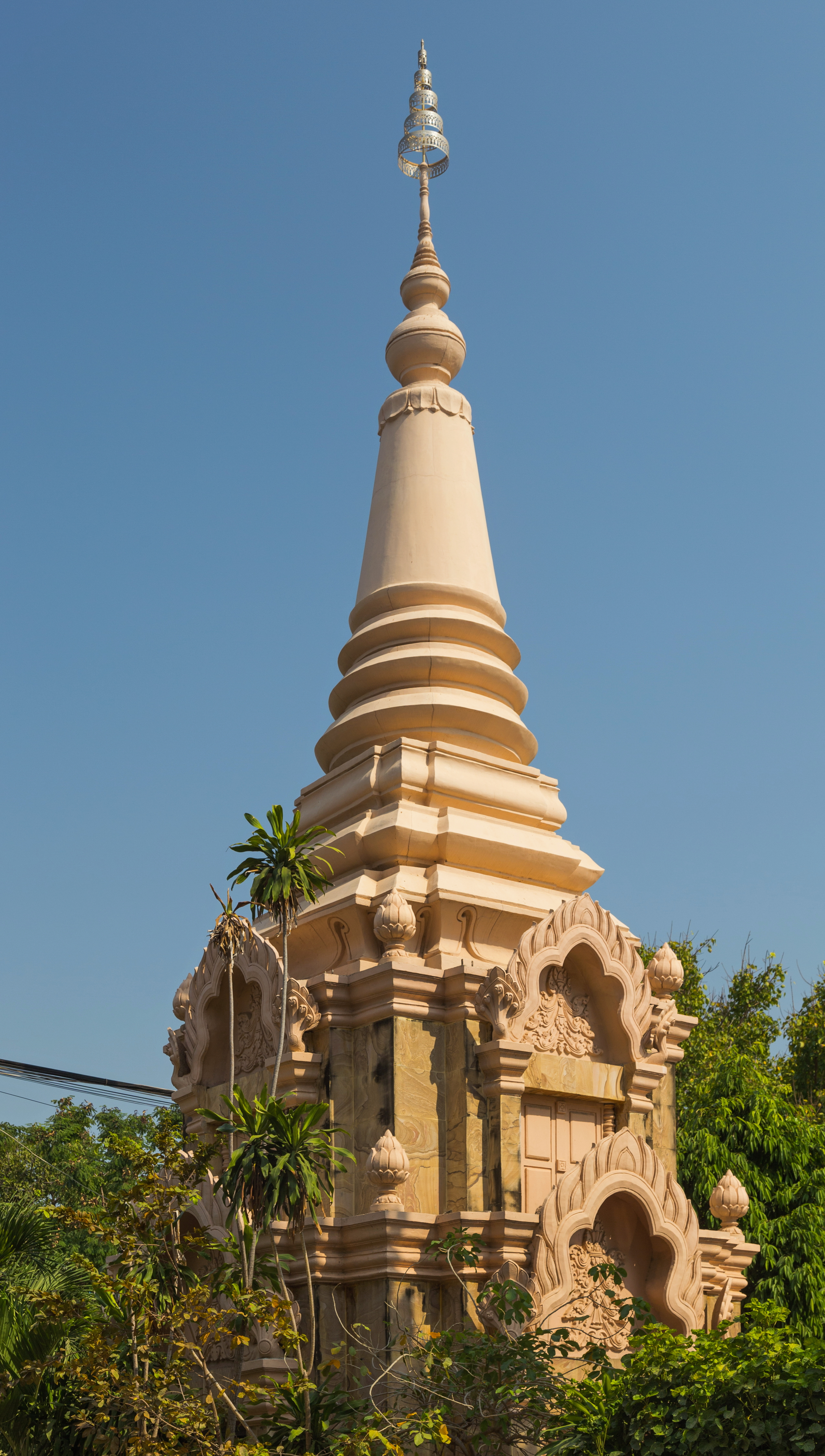

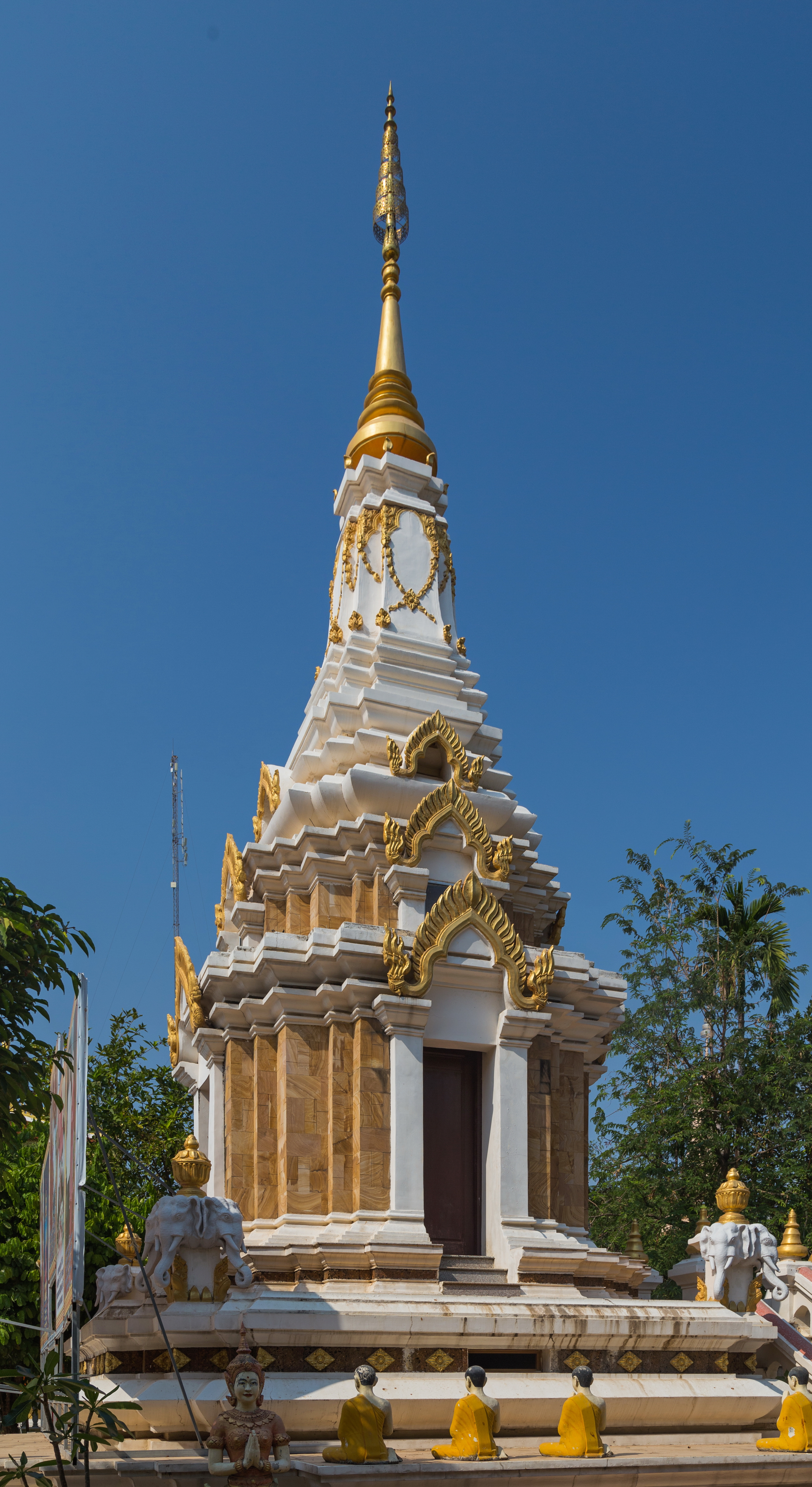

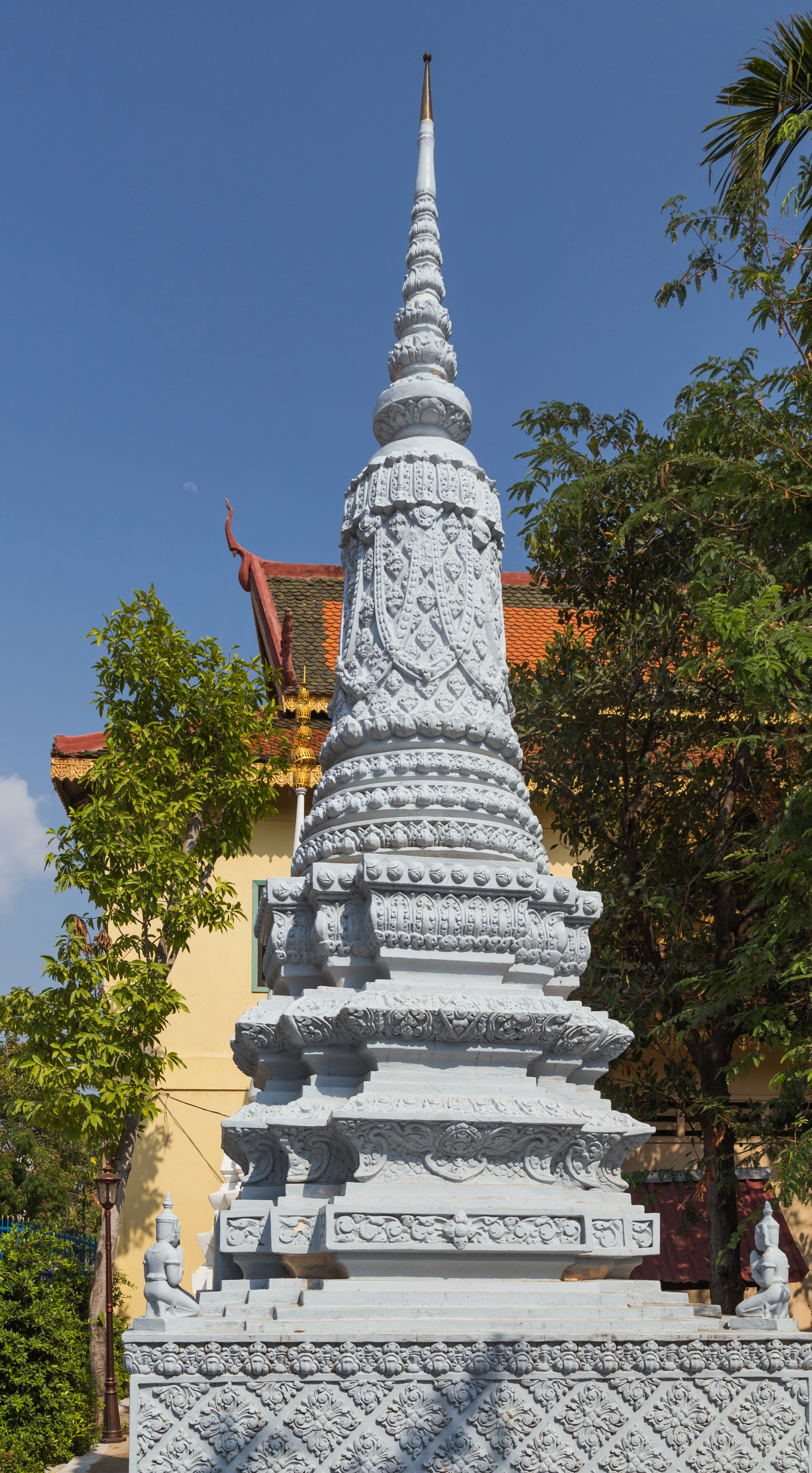

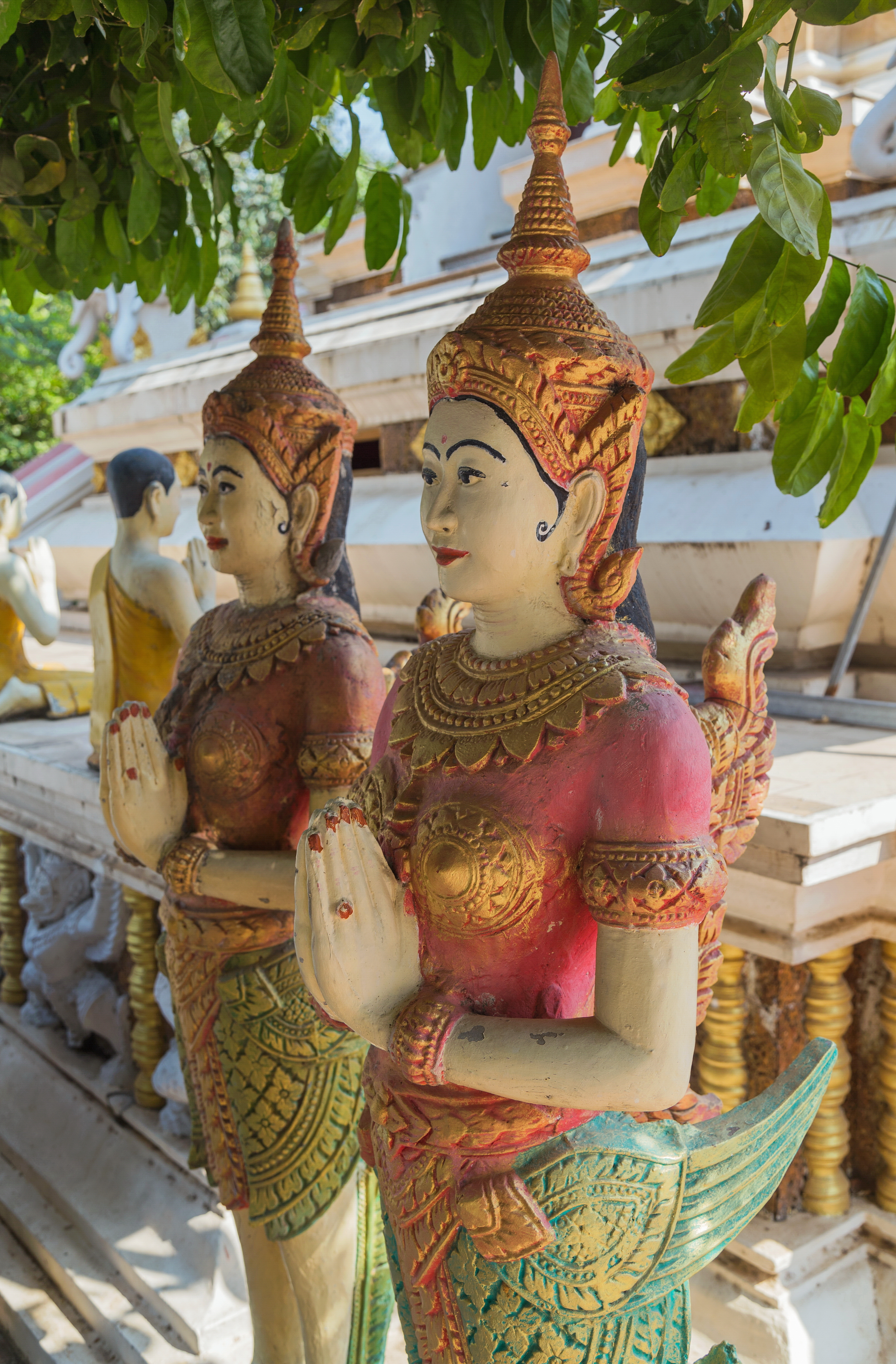

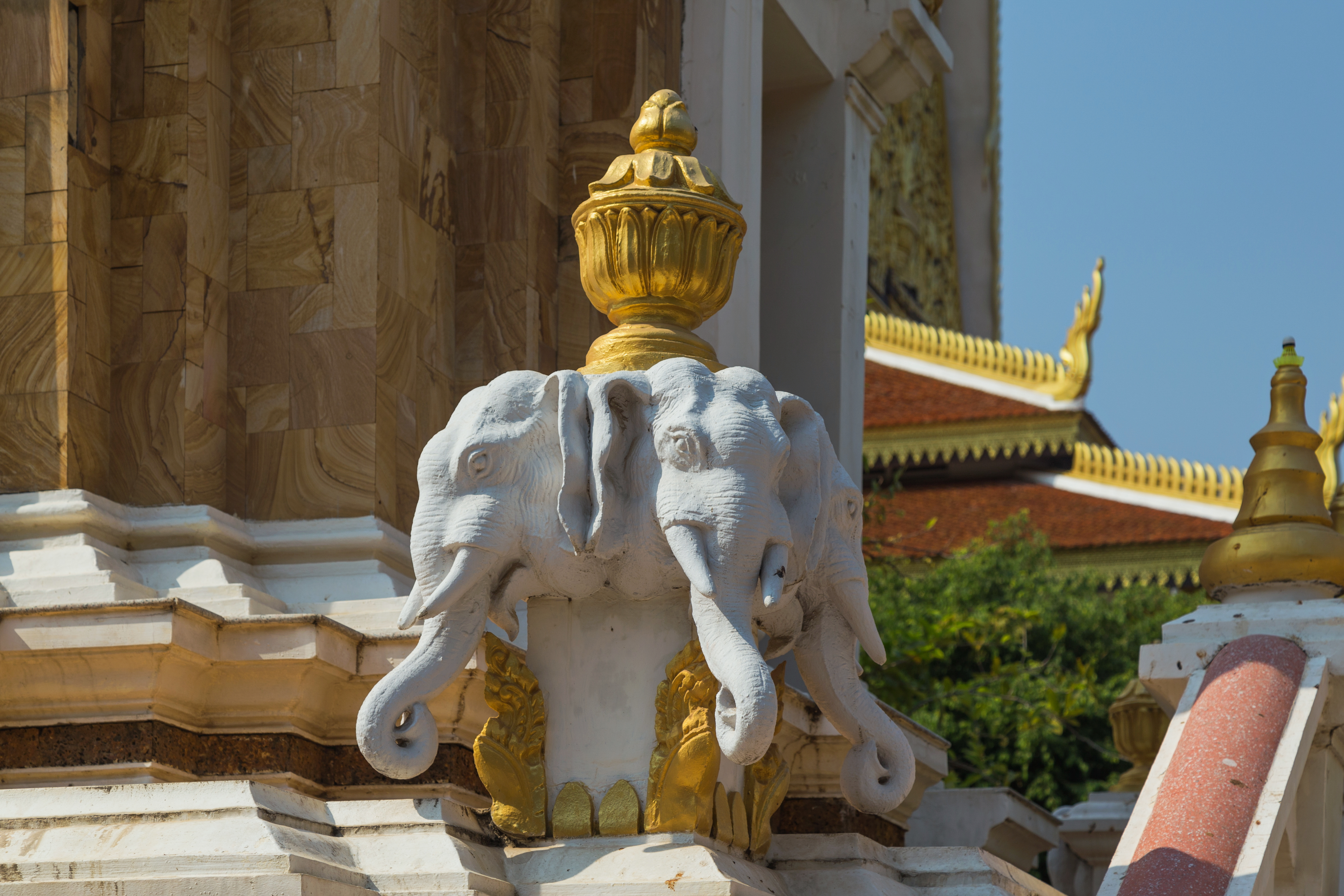

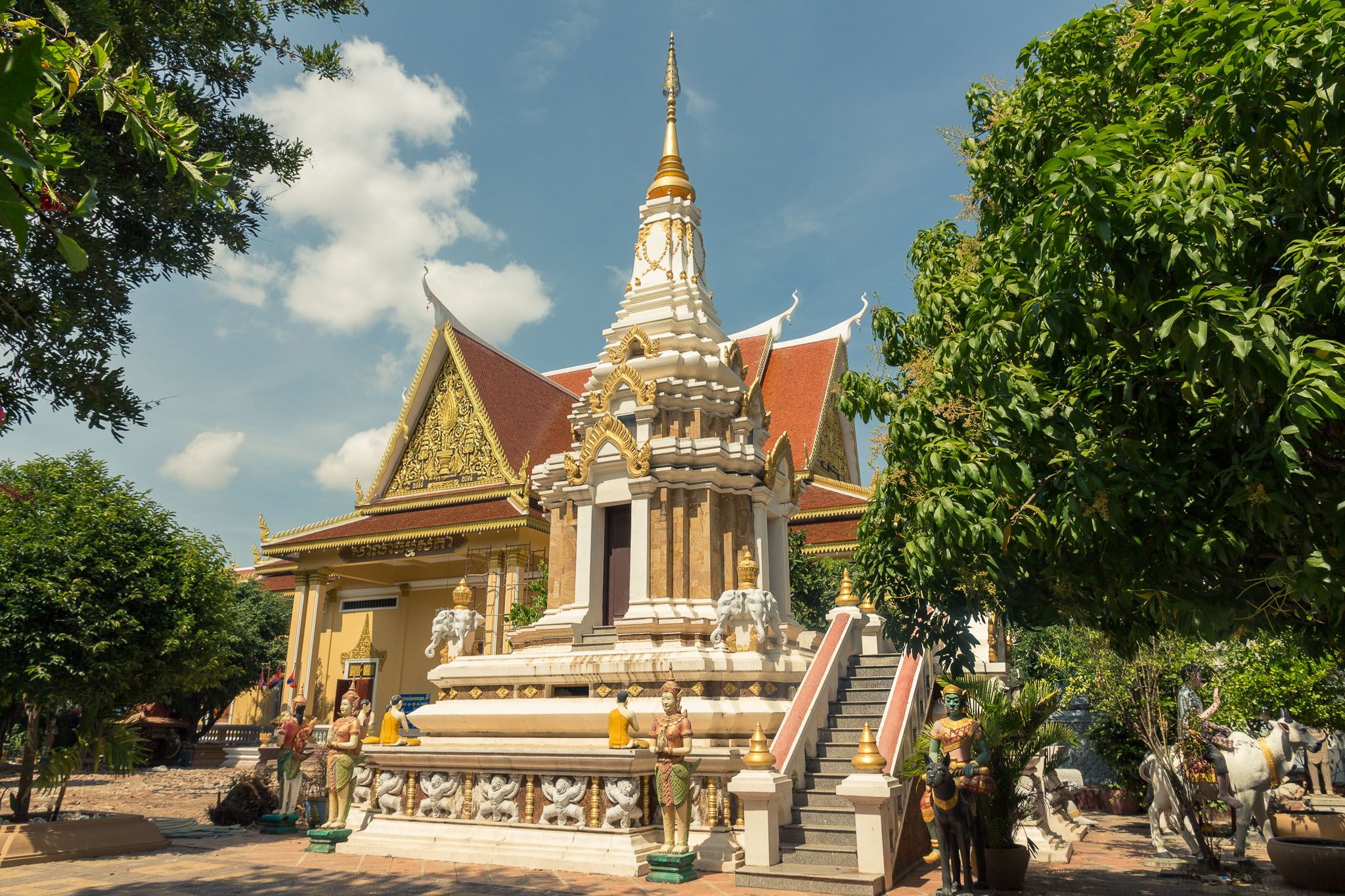

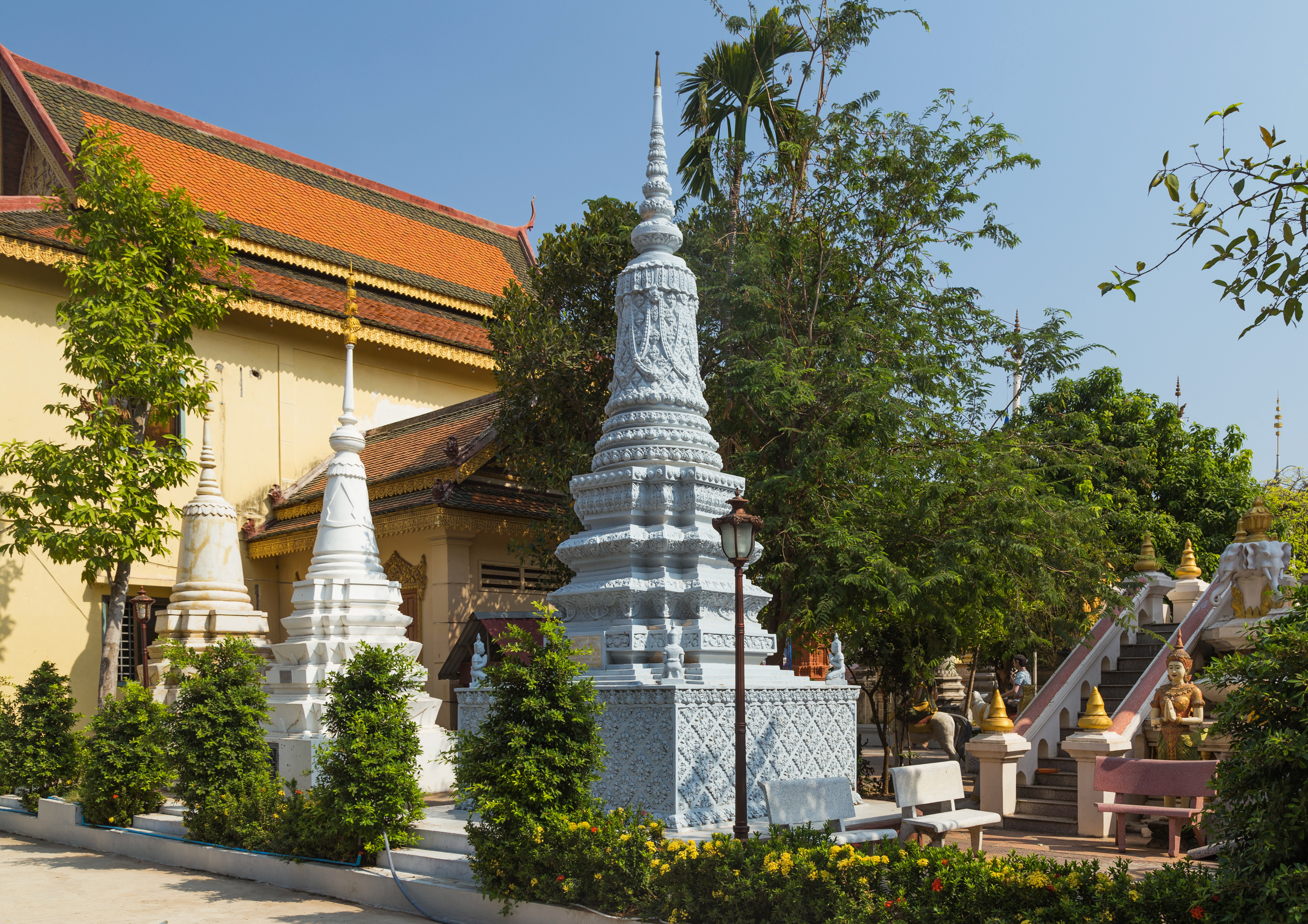

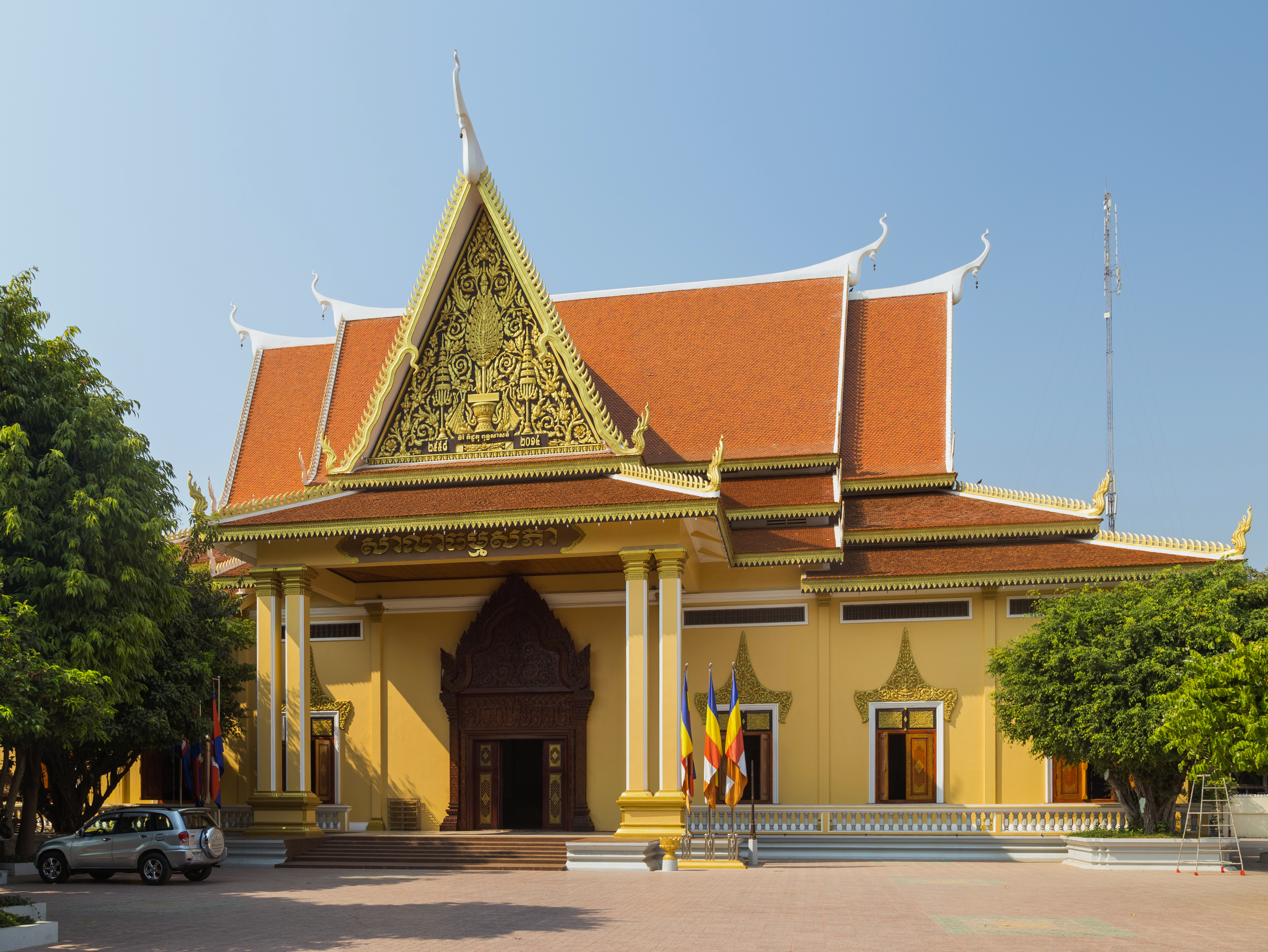
