= Julie Rose =

Australian translator

Julie Rose is an Australian translator. She is best known for her translations of French classics, especially Victor Hugo and Alexandre Dumas, and of contemporary works.

In 2016, she became a Chevalier de l’ordre des arts et des letters and in 2018, won the Medal for Excellence in Translation for her translation of Philippe Paquet's biography of Simon Leys, Simon Leys: Navigator Between Worlds. She was made an Honorary Fellow of the Australian Academy of the Humanities in 2019.
