= Josh Stenberg =

Australian and Canadian translator, writer, and scholar

Josh Stenberg 石峻山 is an Australian and Canadian translator, writer, and scholar. He is an associate professor of Chinese at the University of Sydney.

His translation of the poet Jiang Tao's For a Splendid Sunny Apocalypse was shortlisted for the Medal for Excellence in Translation, the New South Wales Premier's Literary Awards and the Sarah Maguire Prize for Poetry in Translation. Holding a PhD in Chinese theatre from Nanjing University, he has also published translations of fiction by Su Tong and poetry by Huang Fan.

Of his poetry collection Nibs & Nubs, Jean Kent writes "It is a book to read slowly, with awe for its poetic audacity and skill, and gratitude for its sharing of a gamut of emotion from grief to grace."

In China, he is also known for his promotion and translation of Kunqu and Liyuan opera.
