= Stuart Robson =

Stuart Robson may refer to:

- Stuart Robson (actor)
- Stuart Robson (speedway rider)
- Stuart Robson (translator)

== See also ==
- Stewart Robson, former professional footballer
