= Philippe Paquet =

Philippe Paquet may refer to

- Philippe Paquet, French jockey
- Philippe Paquet (born 1960), Belgian historian
