= Robert B. Jones =

Robert B. Jones may refer to:

- Robert Jones (Michigan politician) (1944–2010), politician from the state of Michigan
- Robert B. Jones (linguist) (1920–2007), professor at Cornell University
- Robert Byron Jones (1833–1867), justice of the Louisiana Supreme Court
