= You Bo =

Khmer writer

You Bo is a Khmer writer and the president of the Khmer Writers' Association, whose office is located at Wat Botum, Oknha Suor Srun Street 7, Sangkat Chaktomuk, Khan Daun Penh, Phnom Penh 12207, Cambodia.

You finished high school in 1962, then he became a teacher. To supplement the meager income he received from his teaching job, You wrote poems and stories for local newspapers, such as the Mietophoum newspaper. Later he became the editor-in-chief of that same newspaper when he left teaching in the mid-1960s to focus on his writing.

You Bo had as his teachers some very notable Cambodians, among whom are Nou Hach, Keng Vansak and Samdech Preah Moha Chorn Nath.

== Notable works ==
Some of his well-known works are:

- Mear Jea Sok (មារជាសុខ) - A Guideline to Happiness, 1962;
- The 195-Year-Old Doctor (គ្រូពេទ្យអាយុ១៩៥ឆ្នាំ?), 1964; and
- The Loss of Two Popular Stars, 1967.
