= Alton L. Becker =

American linguist (1932-2011)

Alton Lewis (Pete) Becker
- Born: April 6, 1932; Monroe, Michigan, U.S.
- Died: November 15, 2011; Michigan
- Education: University of Michigan
- Known for: Translation, Philology, Rhetoric, Southeast Asian languages, Ethnography of Communication, Anthropology of Language
- Scientific career
- Fields: Linguistics, Philology, Anthropology
- Workplaces: Kambawza College (Taunggi, Burma), University of Connecticut, Ripon College, University of Michigan
- Thesis: A Generative Description of the English Subject Tagmemes (1967)
- Doctoral advisor: Kenneth Pike

Alton L. (Pete) Becker (April 6, 1932 – November 15, 2011) was an American linguist known for his studies of Burmese grammar and other Southeast Asian languages, including Malaysian, Javanese and Kawi. He was a professor of linguistics at the University of Michigan from 1968 to 1986. Becker published studies in philology, rhetoric, and the ethnography of communication. He was coauthor with Richard E. Young and Kenneth L. Pike of the widely influential college writing textbook, Rhetoric: Discovery and Change, which introduced a Rogerian framework for communication and rhetoric studies as an alternative to the Aristotelian approach. To recognize his significant contributions and publications of translations from Southeast Asian languages to English, the Association for Asian Studies awards the annual A.L. Becker Southeast Asian Literature in Translation Prize to honor his significant contributions.

== Life ==
Becker was born in Monroe, Michigan. In Southeast Michigan, he often attended jazz performances in Detroit, and he also began a lifelong love of canoeing. He studied English literature at the University of Michigan, where he completed a Bachelor's degree in 1954. He married Judith Omans in 1953. He later attended the University of Connecticut, where earned a master's degree in 1956 and also taught. From 1958 to 1961, he lived and worked in Taunggyi, Burma. He moved to Burma with his wife Judith and their son Matthew, and their son Andrew was born there. In Burma, he taught English at Kambawza College under the Fulbright program. He credited this experience in Burma and his study of Burmese for his change in scholarly interests from English literature to linguistics, particularly his work in language and culture, the ethnography of communication, and for his studies of Southeast Asian languages and ancient texts. He returned to Southeast Asia in 1969, when he held a two-year position teaching linguistics at the Universitas Negeri Malang, in Malang, Indonesia.

== Academic career ==
Becker taught at the University of Michigan from 1961 to 1986. From 1961 to 1968, prior to receiving the PhD, he taught English at Michigan while a graduate student under the direction of Kenneth L. Pike. He joined the Department of Linguistics at Michigan as assistant professor in 1968 and was named full professor in 1974. His course "Language and Culture" was particularly popular. At Michigan, Becker performed as a puppeteer with the university Gamelan. Becker's writing about the Javanese wayang (shadow puppet play) was described as "brilliant." In his most well-known essay on the epistemology of the shadow play, he notes that the "neatly divided" visual aspects, musical aspects, and verbal aspects of the performance allow it to be appreciated by many, and Becker's essay makes the play relatable to "outsider" (non-Indonesian) audiences:

An outsider can watch a performance with real aesthetic involvement without knowing the language. The musical accompaniment by the gamelan is appealingly rich and complex. In many ways, a shadowplay can be understood as a silent movie, with a theatre orchestra playing in the pit. Foreigners watch Javanese shadowplays that way with real aesthetic satisfaction.

At the same time, connoisseurs can appreciate the linguistic registers of the dalang (puppeteer) who uses both ancient and modern languages, as well as Javanese and Indonesian, which allows for the plays to simultaneously "speak in the past" and "speak in the present." Becker's essay is the first to examine Indonesian thought and "text-building" through a lens of language and culture as epistemology.

Becker received numerous distinctions that recognized his academic contributions. Becker was Director of the Michigan Center for South and Southeast Asian Studies from 1972 to 1975. He was a senior fellow of the Michigan Society of Fellows from 1975 to 1978 and a scholar in residence at Princeton's Institute for Advanced Study in 1981–1982. He received the University of Michigan Press Book Award in 1995 for this book, recognized as the best book published in 1995 by the press. In 1996, a linguistics conference titled "The Notion of Person: A Conference to Honor the Work of Alton L. Becker" was held in his honor. His publications on semiotics, rhetoric, and the ethnography of communication have been widely influential in linguistics. Upon his death, the Association for Asian Studies established the AAS Southeast Asia Council (SEAC) A. L. Becker Southeast Asian Literature in Translation Prize in Becker's memory.

== Scholarly works ==
=== Books and articles ===
- Becker, Alton L.; Pike, Kenneth L. (April 1964). "Progressive Neutralization in Dimensions of Navaho Stem Matrices". International Journal of American Linguistics. Vol. 30, no. 2. pp. 144–154.
- Young, R. E.; Becker, Alton L.; Pike, Kenneth L. (1970). Rhetoric: Discovery and Change. New York: Harcourt, Brace, & World. ISBN 0155768956.
- Becker, Alton L. (1975). "A Linguistic Image of Nature: The Burmese Numerative Classifier System". Linguistics. Vol. 13, no. 165. pp. 109–122.
- Becker, Alton L. (1979). "Text-Building, Epistemology, and Aesthetics in the Javanese Shadow Theatre". In Aram Yengoyan and Alton L. Becker (ed.). The Imagination of Reality: Essays in Southeast Asian Coherence Systems. Norwood, NJ: ABLEX.
- Yengoyan, Aram; Becker, Alton L., eds. (1979). The Imagination of Reality: Essays in Southeast Asian Coherence Systems. Norwood, NJ: ABLEX. ISBN 9780893910211. OCLC 5101468.
- Becker, Alton L. (1982). "Binding Wild Words: Cohesion in Old Javanese Prose". In Prof. J. W. M. Verhaar, S. J.; Kridalaksana, Harimurti; Moelions, Anton M. (eds.). Pelangi Bahasa; Kumpulan Esai yang Dipersembahkan Kepala. Jakarta: Penerbit Bhratara Karya Aksara.
- Becker, Alton L., ed. (1989). Writing on the Tongue. Michigan papers on South and Southeast Asia no. 33. Ann Arbor, Michigan: Center for South and Southeast Asian Studies, University of Michigan.
- Becker, Alton L. (1993). "The Elusive Figures of Burmese Grammar". In W. Foley (ed.). The Role of Theory in Language Description. Trends in Linguistics, Studies and Monographs 69. Berlin: Mouton de Gruyter.
- Becker, Alton L. (1995). Beyond Translation: Essays toward a Modern Philology. Ann Arbor, Michigan: University of Michigan Press. ISBN 9780472105731.

=== Secondary texts ===
- Regents of the University of Michigan (1984–1987). "Retirement Memoirs: Alton L. Becker, Professor of Linguistics". Proceedings of the Regents of the University of Michigan (1984–1987). pp. 710–712.

== Links ==
- Memoir of A. L. Becker by the Regents of the University of Michigan, 1986
- A. L. Becker entry on ArborWiki
- Faculty Biography from University of Michigan Center for Southeast Asian Studies
- Alton (Pete) Becker, Faculty History Project, University of Michigan 1817-2017
