= Lycée français René Descartes de Phnom Penh =

Secondary school in Cambodia

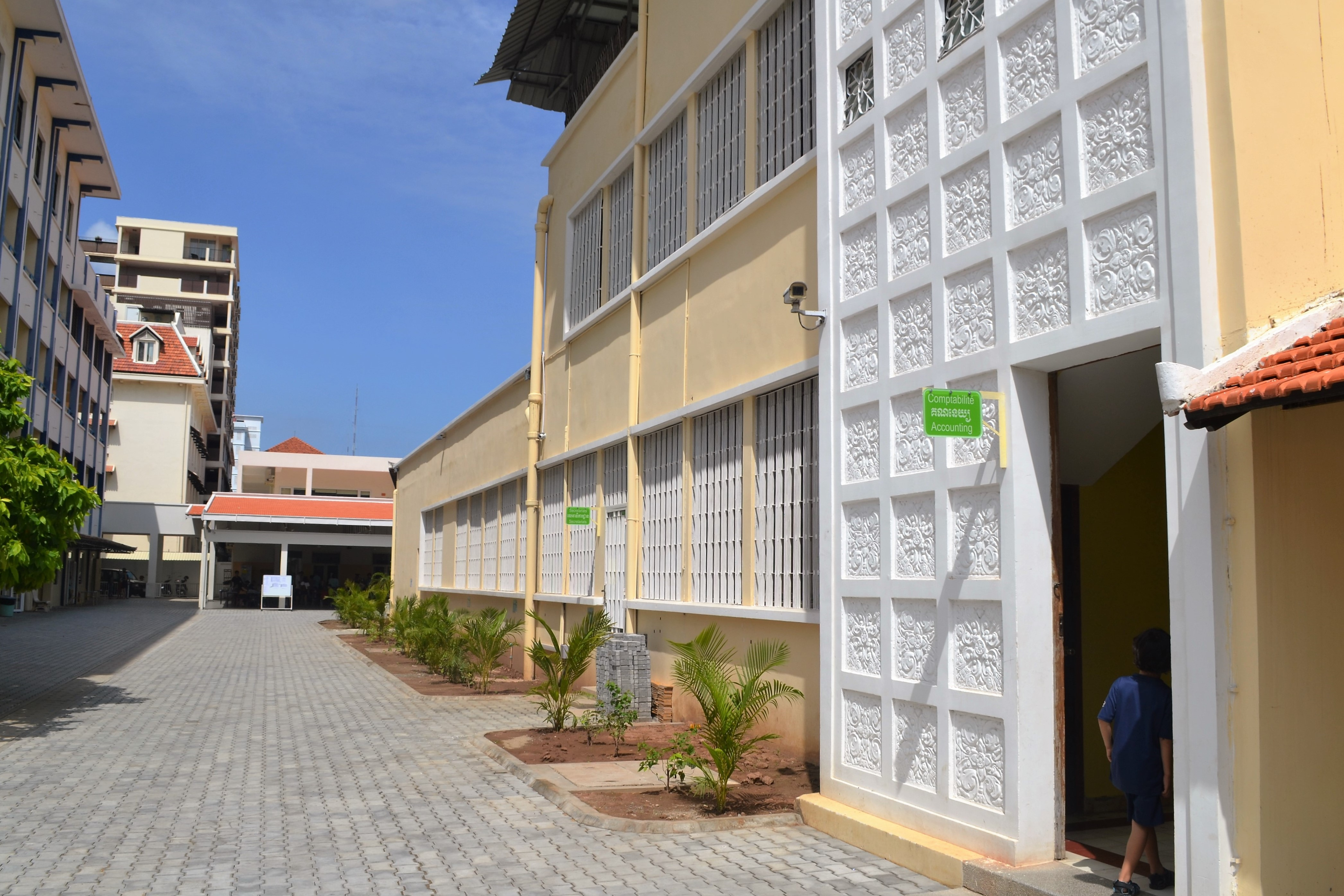

Location
- Oknha Hing Penn St. (61); Phnom Penh; Cambodia; 11.574941°N 104.919616°E

Information
- Established: 1951; 75 years ago
- Oversight: Stephanie Leleu (proviseur adjoint)
- Principal: Gilles Perinet (proviseur)
- Head teacher: Thomas Lagacherie (directeur primaire)
- Language: French
- Affiliation: Agency for French Education Abroad
- Website: http://www.descartes-cambodge.com

The Lycée français René Descartes de Phnom Penh is a private French school in Phnom Penh, Cambodia, operated under agreement with the Agency for French Education Abroad (Agence pour l'enseignement français à l'étranger; AEFE).

The school serves up until terminale, the final year of lycée (senior high school). Degrees offered include the Brevet des Collèges and the Baccalauréat (S, ES and L depending on demand).

Classes range from petite section (maternelle) to terminale (S, ES, L).

The school has one canteen, a basketball court and a handball court (which can be transformed in a soccer football court), a gym, and a swimming pool.

== History ==
In 2009 some land was given back to the institution, and several people living in the land were evicted. Area residents asked for a delay in the process. Residents chose to celebrate the Cambodian New Year in their residences instead of in their hometowns because they were afraid evictions would happen if they were away. Ten people asked the French embassy in Phnom Penh to assist them. Several students protested in favour of the residents.

== Management ==
From a financial, administrative, material and real estate stand point the school is under parental management through its Comité de Gestion. The five parents in the comité are elected by a General Assembly in May of each year.

With respect to teaching, the school is managed by a Proviseur who oversees the operations of the whole school and in particular the teaching needs of the secondary school. The Proviseur, who reports directly to the AEFE, is responsible for certifying that the teachings are in line with that of the French Ministry of Education.

The Directeur du Primaire is responsible for overseeing the operations of the Kindergarten and Primary school. The Directeur reports directly to the AEFE.

== Notable staff ==
- Khuon Sokhamphu
