= Phka Srapoun =

1949 novel by Nou Hach

- Author: Nou Hach
- Original title: ផ្កាស្រពោន
- Language: Khmer
- Publication date: 1949
- Publication place: Cambodia

Phka Srapoun (Khmer: ផ្កាស្រពោន, Phka Srâpoŭn [pʰkaː srɑpoːn]; lit. 'Wilted Flower') is a Khmer novel written by Nou Hach and published in 1949. Along with Kolab Pailin and Sophat, Phka Srapoun is considered one of the three classic novels of modern Khmer literature. The novel is set during the French colonial period of Cambodia. The story portrays the Cambodian tradition of arranged marriages.

== Author ==
Nou Hach (Khmer: នូ ហាច) was born on June 26, 1916, in Kampong Preah Commune, Sangkae District, Battambang, Cambodia. His father's name was Khuon Nov (Khmer: ឃួន នៅ), and his mother name was Or Muoch (Khmer: ឳរ មួច). They were farmers. Hach was the eldest child of the family, he married Mrs. Tan Rem (Khmer: តាន់ រ៉េម) and had eight children.

His famous works include:

- Phka Srapoun (ផ្កាស្រពោន)
- Mealea Duong Chett (មាលាដួងចិត្ត)
- Truoy Chivit (ត្រួយជីវិត)
- Neari Chea Ti Sneha (នារីជាទីស្នេហា)
- Tho Bek, a French poem (ថូបែក)

== Plot summary ==
Bun Thoeun (ប៊ុនធឿន) and Vitheavy (វិធាវី) have been arranged to marry since they were young. Unfortunately, Bunthoeun's family becomes poor after a storm sinks the boat his father uses to transport the rice in Prey Nokor.

Mrs. Nuon (យាយនួន), mother of Vitheavy, is a person who prefers money over honor and honesty. She drops the engagement between Bunthoeun and her daughter, and engages Vitheavy instead to Naisot (ណៃស៊ត), who is a rich man. Naisot is bad-tempered and immoral. He uses his money to do anything he wants.

After becoming engaged to Naisot, Vitheavy falls ill, and pines for Bunthoeun. However, she dares not argue with her mother over the engagement. Her health worsens. Seeing this, Mrs. Nuon brings her daughter to the resort town of Siem Reap, but Vitheavy's spirits remain low.

Vitheavy coughs up blood. Her mother being superstitious, brings her to the fortune teller and uses various methods to try to cure her. However, it does not work and her illness remains serious.

After Bunthoeun discovers Vitheavy will marry someone else, he becomes sad and cries alone. He goes into the forest for days with Mr. So (តាសូ) to find firewood and fish to reduce stress. When he returns home, Vitheavy dies which causes him much grief.
