= Sophat =

Cambodian romance novel by Rim Kin

- Author: Rim Kin
- Original title: សូផាត (GD: Sophat)
- Language: Khmer
- Genre: Romance
- Publication date: 1942
- Publication place: Cambodia
- Media type: Print (Paperback)

Sophat (Khmer: សូផាត [soːpʰaːt]) was the first Cambodian romance novel written in 1938 by Rim Kin and was published in 1942. Along with Kolab Pailin and Phka Srapoun, Sophat is widely regarded as the “first” Cambodian novel and is considered one of the three classic novels of Khmer literature, though Tuek Tonle Sap ("The Waters of Tonle Sap"), by Kim Hak had been printed in 1939.

== Context ==
Modern prose started later in Cambodia by comparison with the rest of Southeast Asia. It was only in the 1930s, several years after the installation of a printing-house in Phnom Penh that the new genre came into existence, and Sophat was the first bestseller of its kind.

== Synopsis ==
Suon, a government official in Sisophon, has an affair with an orphan woman called Soya, and she becomes pregnant. Concerned about his career and the wedding his own mother had arranged for him, Suon returns to Phnom Penh and leaves Sorya with a ring which lets her hope for his return, until she dies, and sends their son, Sophat, to learn at the pagoda. The eponymous hero is then sent to further his studies in Phnom Penh where he resides at Wat Ounalom, and befriends Narin, after he defends him from being bullied by others. Narin invites Sophat to come and live at his house, where he meets his adopted sister, Man Yan, which whom he falls in love. One day, Sophat forgets the ring his mother had given him in the bathroom. When the father of Narin sees the ring, he understands Sophat is his son, and as he becomes benevolent towards him. Sophat feels unworthy of such consideration, and flees to become a fisherman, and is presumed by all to be dead, while Man Yan is married to another man, whom she rejects on her wedding day as she jumps into a river, but is saved from drowning by Sophat who was fishing nearby, and the two are married and live happily ever after.

== Analysis ==
=== A milestone of Cambodian literary identity ===
Sophat is a milestone in Cambodian literature, as it integrates classic Khmer literature, such as many proverbs of Krom Ngoy, and it introduces a novel genre which would prove immensely popular well into the 21st century in Cambodia. Parallel to the first Vietnamese novel written in French (Nguyen Phan Long’s Le Roman de Mademoiselle Lys, 1921), the first Cambodian novel in Khmer is also indicative of the construction of Cambodian and Vietnamese identities in relation to one another. Sophat quickly became part of the national literature and even internationally recognized as such. At Yale University in 1972, Khmer language was taught though Khmer reading selections which included folk stories, descriptions of Khmer antiquities, didactic essays, newspaper stories, and only one short novel, Sophat, by Rim Kin.

=== A moral criticism of lust and ambition ===
Sophat incorporates themes of Buddhist morality and has been republished many times. It is regarded as characteristic of contemporary Khmer novels, which often use adventurous plots to criticise the shortcomings of successive regimes.

=== Women in Cambodian society ===
In a context in which the Chbab Srey was still very influential and taught in both private houses and public schools, Sophat depicts both the repression endured by Cambodian women at that time and the ripple effects that this treatment could have on all of society. This tale begins with the abandonment of a pregnant young woman by the well-to-do, high-ranking father of her unborn child, who goes to Phnom Penh for work. She is left to deliver her baby alone, without any support from relatives. When Man Yan, the adopted daughter of the rich man, falls deeply in love with the poor Sophat, she cannot express this to him because to do so would be unseemly for a woman. She goes on to attempt suicide by jumping into a river on her wedding day, but she is saved from drowning by the poor Sophat who has become a fisherman on that same river.

== Recognition ==
The novel Sophat was written by Rim Kin in 1938 but not published until 1942 due to a lack of publishing facilities in Cambodia at that time. Sophat was eventually published in 1942 by Man-sanh, in Saigon, where it was cheaper than Cambodia to publish books.

Sophat is Rim Kin's most famous novel and one of the classics of modern Cambodian literature. From 1955 to 1975, it was taught in the program of the fifth grade classes in Cambodia schools.

Sophat was later translated by Gérard Groussin and published in French as Sophat by L’Harmattan in 1994.

== See also ==
- A New Sun Rises Over the Old Land
