= Saveros Pou =

Cambodian linguist

Saveros Pou (Khmer: ពៅ សាវរស, UNGEGN: Poŭ Savôrôs, ALA-LC: Bau Sāvaras [pɜw saʋɔruəh]; 24 August 1929 – 25 June 2020), also known around 1970 under the name Saveros Lewitz, was a French linguist of Cambodian origin. A retired research director of the CNRS in Paris, a specialist of the Khmer language and civilization, she carried out extensive work of Khmer epigraphy, started as a young researcher with her teacher George Cœdès.

Her work in the field of etymology, specifically applied to Old Khmer (from the 6th to the 14th) was seminal, but her varied skills enabled her to tackle areas such as the very rich processes of derivation in Khmer, religion, codes of conduct ( CPAP '), zoology and botany, cooking, etc. This encyclopedic spirit is particularly evident in her Dictionnaire vieux khmer-français-anglais.

== Biography ==
Born 24 August 1929 in Phnom Penh, Saveros Pou came to France for her graduate studies, carried out under the guidance of teachers such as François Martini, Au Chhieng, Jean Filliozat, Louis Renou and George Cœdès, which enabled her to acquire very varied theoretical language skills and practices.

In 1965 she presented a postgraduate doctorate on Khmer toponymy, of which large extracts were included in 1967 in the Bulletin de l'École française d'Extrême-Orient. In 1978, she supported her State doctorate devoted to Rāmakerti, the Khmer version of the Ramayana.

She is the author of more than 150 books and articles, published in several orientalist journals such as the Journal Asiatique and the Bulletin de l'École française d'Extrême-Orient.

Using the pioneering work in Khmer phonetics of Khuon Sokhamphu, Saveros Pou developed the transliteration system for the Khmer language used by George Coedès, which permits to see very easily borrowings from Sanskrit and Pali, and is complemented by some specific letters in Khmer (vowels ែ ae, ើ oe, ៀ īe, ឿ īoe, among others). Thus, the modern word ទន្តពេទ្យ for "dentist", pronounced toan'pèt', but transliterated dantabedy, is a complex formation from the Sanskrit words danta : "tooth" and vaidya : "physician" (verbal root VID "to know"; in Sanskrit, b and v are often used interchangeably and the vowel e like ai derives from i. This transliteration system is used inter alia at the INALCO.

She died in Villeneuve-Saint-Georges southeast of Paris on 25 June 2020, 81 days short of her 91st birthday.

== Bibliography ==
Her detailed bibliography is to be found on the site of the AEFEK. Her major publications include:

=== As Saveros Lewitz ===
- La toponymie khmère, BEFEO (Bulletin de l'École française d'Extrême-Orient) 53, 2, 1967, pp. 377-450.
- (with Gabrielle Martel and Jules-Eugène Vidal) Notes ethnobotaniques sur quelques plantes en usage au Cambodge, BEFEO 55, 1969, p. 171-232.
- (with Bruno Rollet) Lexique des noms d’arbres et d’arbustes au Cambodge, BEFEO 60, 1973, pp. 113-162.

=== As Saveros Pou ===
- Ramakerti (XVIè-XVIIè siècles), Traduit et commenté par Saveros Pou, Paris, École française d'Extrême-Orient, vol. CX, 1977, 299 p.
- Etudes sur le Ramakerti (XVIè-XVIIè siècles), Paris, EFEO, vol. CXI, 1977, 201 p.
- Ramakerti (XVIè-XVIIè siècles), Texte khmer publié par Saveros Pou, Paris, EFEO, vol. CXVII, 1979, IX + 330 p.
- Ramakerti II (Deuxième version du Ramayaṇa khmer), Texte khmer, traduction et annotations par Saveros Pou, Paris, EFEO, vol. CXXXII, 1982, 305 p. + Planches.
- Nouvelles inscriptions du Cambodge I, École française d'Extrême-Orient, Paris, 1989, 155 p. + 32 p. de planches.
- Les noms de monuments khmers, BEFEO 78, 1991, p. 203-226.
- Nouvelles inscriptions du Cambodge II & III, École française d'Extrême-Orient, Paris, 2001, 334 p. dont 44 de planches.
- Choix d'articles de khmérologie, Reyum Publishing, Phnom Penh, 2003, XV+448 p.
- Dictionnaire vieux khmer-français-anglais. An Old Khmer-French-English Dictionary, L'Harmattan, 2004, 2nd edition augmentée, 732 p.
- (with Grégory Mikaelian) Rāmakerti I – « La gloire de Rāma ». Drame épique médiéval du Cambodge, Paris, L'Harmattan, 2007, 440 p.
- (with Grégory Mikaelian) Nouvelles inscriptions du Cambodge, Vol. IV, Paris, L’Harmattan, 2011, 165 p. + VII p. d’illustrations.
