= Nhok Them =

Cambodian author (1903–1974)

- ញ៉ុក ថែម
- Born: 22 June 1903; Svay Por Commune, Sangkae District, Battambang Province, Cambodia, French Indochina
- Died: 1974 (aged 70–71)
- Occupation: Author
- Spouse: Nguon Naisim
- Parents: Nhom (father); Heak (mother)

Nhok Them (Khmer: ញ៉ុក ថែម, Nhŏk Thêm [ɲok tʰaem]; 22 June 1903 – 1974) was a Cambodian writer known for his novel Kolab Pailin.

== Childhood and education ==
Them was born in a farmer family in Svay Por Commune, Sangkae District, Battambang, Cambodia. In 1913, he studied in Por Veal Pagoda in Sangkae District, Battambang. He studied Khmer literature with Teacher Sorn and learnt Dharma with Teacher Eav Touch in Por Veal Pagoda.

In 1918, he was ordained. He studied Dharma with other monks in Battambang. He went to study in Bangkok, Thailand in 1919. He got a lot of certificates related to Buddhism. In 1936, he decided to leave monkhood.

== Career ==
When he went to Thailand, he worked there. He worked as a Pali teacher in Bangkok from 1927 to 1930 before returning to Phnom Penh to be a member of the Tripitaka Committee at the Buddhist Institute. In 1938, he worked at the Royal Library of Cambodia as a publishing manager for Kambujsuriya Magazine. The next year (1939), he was appointed to represent Norodom Sothearos and the Buddhist Institute to prepare curriculums and to inaugurate the Buddhist Institute in Luang Phrabang and Vientiane, Laos. In 1942, he inaugurated the Buddhist Institute in Kliang province and in 1943, he was a representative for preparing curriculum for the Buddhist Institute in Pakse, Laos.

In 1946, he worked at the Buddhist Institute and became a professor at Lycée Sisowath. He resigned from the Buddhist Institute in 1950 and worked at the Ministry of National Education (ក្រសួងសិក្សាធិការជាតិ).

== Work ==
While in Thailand, he wrote books in Thai and Bali Thai. Those include Neakmokkatha, Neaneacheadork, Vannea, Thom Niteas Part 1, Tevada Pheasit and Puth Peasit.

In addition, he was the author of many works incorporating:

Original title	English title	Note
ពុទ្ធប្បវត្តិសង្ខេប	Brief History of the Buddha	
អនុពុទ្ធប្បវត្តិ		Part 1-2
ប្រជុំភាសិត		Part 1-2
មហាវេស្សន្ដរជាតក		
ប្រជុំពុទ្ធភាសិត		
ជាតិ សាសនា ព្រះមហាក្សត្រ	Nation, Religion, King	
រឿងបិសាចស្នេហា	Love Monster	The novel was published in 1942.
រឿងកុលាបប៉ៃលិន	Rose of Pailin	The novel was published in 1936 or 1943
ឯកសហរាត្រី		Some parts were translated.
ចូឡវេទល្លសូត្រ		Translation
វិធីប្រតិបត្តិធម៌	How to Practice Dharma	
ពន្លឺអាស៊ីទ្វីប	Asia's Light	Translation
បញ្ញាសជាតកសង្ខេប		Part 1-2

== Marriage Life ==
In 1937, Them married Ngoun Naisim at Psar Oudong, Veangchas District, Odongk District, Kampong Speu Province and had 7 sons and 4 daughters.
