= David Holm =

Australian translator

David Holm is an Australian researcher and translator, nominated for the 2018 Medal for Excellence in Translation for and winner of the Australian Institute of Interpreters and Translators's Excellence in Translation award. A professor at National Chengchi University, he is best known for his work on Zhuang texts.
