= A New Sun Rises Over the Old Land =

Cambodian novel of the Sankgum era

A New Sun Rises Over The Old Land
- 2020 edition
- Author: Suon Sorin
- Original title: ព្រះអាទិត្យថ្មីរះលើផែនដីចាស់
- Translator: Roger Nelson
- Language: Khmer
- Genre: Romance
- Publication date: 1962
- Publication place: Cambodia
- Media type: Print (Paperback)

A New Sun Rises Over the Old Land (Khmer: ព្រះអាទិត្យថ្មីរះលើផែនដីចាស់) is a Cambodian novel published in 1961 and the only published work of Suon Sorin who disappeared during the Khmer Rouge regime. It has become a "canonical novel" and an iconic work of modern Cambodian literature.

== Context ==
A New Sun Rises over the Old Land, is set during the reign of Norodom Sihanouk in Cambodia. The Cambodian independence of 1953 sets a chronological marker of a before and after in the novel of Suon Sorin. First published in 1961, eight years after Cambodia gained independence from French colonial rule, the novel offers a fresh view into a period of profound transformation in Cambodia during the Sangkum era.

== Synopsis ==
Sam, with his wife Soy, leaves his native Battambang province, in order to flee from armed conflict between the Issarak and the French colonial forces. He reaches Phnom Penh but in capital city, he struggles with the impossible livelihood of daily wagers driving his cyclo or rickshaw, taking turns with his wife. As they fall into poverty, their life is made impossible when their pedicab is repossessed and they are eventually evicted from their home, without any mercy shown by their owner and landlord. Without a penny left and with no one ready to lend them money, Soy puts herself at the service of a rich merchant.

== Analysis ==
=== Authorship: the opus unicum of a promising writer ===
The author of the novel, Suon Sorin, was born in 1930 in the Sangker district of Battambang, Cambodia. A New Sun Rises Over the Old Land is his only known work of fiction. He is believed to have died during the Khmer Rouge period.

=== Literary style: a Cambodian zeitgeist ===
The book is about 100 pages-long and is divided into 19 chapters, each of them 3-6 pages. Except for the conclusion and prologue, in which cyclo rider Sam is on his way to attend a National Congress as a delegate, the entire book is set in flashback three years after the independence of Cambodia. It is a form of Cambodian zeitgeist which can be read as a prescriptive tale. Looking back in time, it also looks back with both praise and criticism at the evolution of Cambodian society. Thus, the author is more concerned with types and class than the individual, his novel trying to encompass the problems of this society as a whole.

In the context of Southeast Asian committed literature of the 1960s which were concerned with solidarity in society and the fate of the poor, the novel is a "singularly illuminating historical document of the new nation-offers a fresh view into a period of profound transformation in Cambodia." His main character's aspiration for a good life – guided by ethics, hard work and harmonious relations – echoes Sihanouk's promise of modernisation, as well as the ambiguity of his tenuous ideological balance between monarchism, conservatism and “Buddhist socialism”. Sorin highlights Chinese and Vietnamese origins of the capitalist class through their names, and contrasts them with Sam.

=== Significance: the beacon of hope of Cambodian literature ===
In the literary movement of the Cambodian novel which emerged since the publication of Sophat by Rim Kin in 1938, the Khmer novels multiplied in 1960s with various tendencies. Whereas Soth Polin had given into the pessimism of existentialism, in such books as Life is pointless, Suon Sorin represents the hopes that were shared by many young Cambodians of his generation in the Sungkum as their country strived for independence. While some, such as David Chander, have praised the novel, others, with retrospect, have criticized the novel as political propaganda too naive and plain: "the glorification of the Sihanouk regime comes across as very toadying." While not aiming directly at Suon Sorin, Jacques Népote and Khing Hoc Dy assert the quality of modern Cambodian literature (as opposed to the earlier classical literature) was “normally very poor” and that style of the writing from this period was often “careless and demagogic”. The literary promotion of Sihanouk's policies was equaled in the visual arts by Cambodian painter Nhek Dim.

Reading this passionate, absorbing novel, it’s poignant to re-enter a period that was filled for many Cambodians with optimism, autonomy and self-respect.

— David J. Chandler

== Reception ==
=== Awards ===
Sorin's novel was a bestseller upon its release and remains widely read in contemporary Cambodia. In 1961, A New Sun Rises over the Old Land won the first Indradevi Literary Competition under the auspices of then-Head of State, King Father Norodom Sihanouk. During his speech, King Sihanouk commented on the role of Cambodian writers holding “a responsibility not only to literature, but also to nation-building”.

It remains widely read in Cambodia today, and is still prescribed reading in many Cambodian schools and universities.

In 2020, Fathers, a Khmer movie, had a script written as a palimpsest of the 1962 novel, using the cyclo of Phnom Penh as the battleground of social injustice in Cambodia. The film was submitted for the Academy awards.

=== Translation ===
Excerpts of the book were translated into English in 1974 and praised as models of contemporary Cambodian language by the Foreign Service Institute. The book was translated in full into English by Roger Nelson, curator at National Gallery Singapore, and published in 2019. This translation received the 2022 A.L. Becker Southeast Asian Literature in Translation Prize from the Association for Asian Studies.
