= Nou Hach =

Cambodian writer

- នូ ហាច
- Born: 26 June 1916; Kampong Preah Commune, Sangkae District, Battambang Province, Cambodia, French Indochina
- Died: 1975 (aged 58–59); Kampuchea
- Occupation: Author
- Spouse: Tan Rem
- Parents: Khuon Nov (father); Or Muoch (mother)

Nou Hach (Khmer: នូ ហាច, Nu Hach [nuː haːc]; 26 June 1916 – 1975) was a Cambodian author, perhaps best known for his novel, Phka Sropoun. He was born in Battambang, and died during the Khmer Rouge regime.

== Early life and education ==
Hach was born to a farming family in Kampong Preah Commune, Sangkae District, Battambang Province, Cambodia. He was the first child of his family. He studied at Wat Kampong Preah Primary School and could read sastra sloek roet (សាស្ត្រាស្លឹករឹត), a kind of Khmer book made from leaves, very fluently. In 1932, he passed the entrance exam at Preah Sisovath High School in Phnom Penh. He was very studious and hardworking, and graduated successfully.

== Career ==
After graduation, he work as a jude in Siem Reap. In 1947, he became a publisher for Kampuchea Newspaper in the Ministry of information. Then he became the assistant of the prime minister Youtevong in 1948. After that, he returned to the Ministry of Information and worked as the head of the department.

In 1952, he worked for the Ministry of Foreign Affairs, as Director in Directorate of Political Affairs (Director en Direction des Affaires Politiques). As Director, he was sent to have commission in Thailand, Yugoslavia and so on. Due to his good work, he was appointed as the Cambodian representative to Vietnam and Indonesia, as well as a special representative at United Nations.

In 1952, King Norodom Sihanouk appointed him as the secretary of Ministry of Public Works and Communication by Royal Decree 252.

On January 17, 1958, he became a member of the Khmer Writer Association, created by Rim Kin in 1954, according to Neak Nipun Khmer Magazine Year 2, Number 3, February 1996 Page 3.

== Personal life ==
Nou Hach married Tan Rem and had 8 children. Some of his children currently live in the United States and Australia. He was killed by the Khmer Rouge in 1975.

== Literary career and selected works ==
His best-known novel is Phka Sropoun. He also wrote numerous poems in French. In addition, he contributed to many magazines, such as Reatrey Thngai Sao Magazine, Neary Magazine, and Roum Mitt Magazine.

His other works include:

Title	Title in Khmer	Year	Other
Phka Srâpoŭn	ផ្កាស្រពោន	1949	
Méaléa Duŏng Chĕtt	មាលាដួងចិត្ត	1972	
Truŏy Chivĭt	ត្រួយជីវិត	1973	
Môthŭrôsâchéatĕ	មធុរសជាតិ	1951	Neary Magazine Number 10 Page 353-356
Kon Krâk	កូនក្រក	1953	French poem published in Roum Mitt Magazine, Number 8, May 15, 1953, Pages 15–16
Dâmnaeur Chénh Tŏu Brâtés Bareăng (Departure to France)	ដំណើរចេញទៅប្រទេសបារាំង	1952	French poem published in Neary Magazine, Number 11, November 11, 1951, Page 396
Khting	ខ្ទីង	1951	Example
Néari Chéa Ti Snéha	នារីជាទីស្នេហា	1953	
Léavoăny nĭng Rôvĭnt	លាវ័ណ្យនិងរវិន្ទ	1953-1955	Published Part 1 in 1953 and Part 2 in 1955
Lbat Kôy Knŏng Kréa Muŏy Noŭ Tônlé Sab	ល្បាតគយក្នុងគ្រាមួយនៅទន្លេសាប	1952	Reatrey Thngai Sao, Number 10, February 19, 1952, Pages 29–31
Tho Bêk (Broken Vase)	ថូបែក	1952	French poem published in Neary Magazine, Number 13, January 1952, Page 11
