= Judith Becker =

American ethnomusicologist and academic (born 1932)

- Born: September 3, 1932; Bay City, Michigan
- Education: University of Michigan (Ph.D., 1972)
- Known for: Study of music in Indonesia, brain science, music and emotion, music and trance, musical grammars.
- Awards: Charles Seeger lecturer (2003), Alan P. Merriam Prize (2005), Honorary Member of the Society for Ethnomusicology (2011)
- Scientific career
- Fields: Ethnomusicology, Southeast Asian studies, Anthropology
- Workplaces: University of Michigan
- Thesis: Traditional Music in Modern Java (1972)
- Doctoral advisor: William P. Malm
- Doctoral students: Deborah Wong
- Website: Faculty profile

Judith O. Becker (born September 3, 1932) is an American academic and educator. She is a scholar of the musical and religious cultures of South and Southeast Asia, the Islamic world and the Americas. Her work combines linguistic, musical, anthropological, and empirical perspectives. As an ethnomusicologist and Southeast Asianist, she is noted for her study of musics in South and Southeast Asia, including Javanese gamelan, Burmese harp, music and trance, music and emotion, neuroscience, and a theoretical rapprochement of empirical and qualitative methods. Becker teaches at the University of Michigan. In 2000, Becker was named the Glenn McGeoch Collegiate Professor of Musicology at the University of Michigan, and she was named professor emerita of music in 2008. From 1993 to 1997, she was a Senior Fellow of the Michigan Society of Fellows.

== Scholarly work and contributions ==
Becker completed a bachelor's degree in music at the University of Michigan before completing the doctorate there in 1972. Her early work was based on in-depth ethnography and on-site research of the Burmese harp (sang gauk) and Javanese gamelan; however, her later work challenged in-depth ethnography as the dominant research method in ethnomusicology, specifically by investigating the relationship between esoteric texts of Tantrism and Sufism with musical thinking and more recently through explorations of the intersections of neuroscience, music, and emotion. These studies, which were informed by ethnography as well as other research methods, were the basis for Becker's books Gamelan Stories (1993) and Deep Listeners (2004). From 1968 to 2002, Becker was director of the University of Michigan Javanese gamelan ensemble (Kyai Telaga Madu), and with Alton L. Becker directed many performances of wayang and klenengang in Ann Arbor and Indonesia.

Becker's latest work, bringing perspectives from empirical studies of the brain and perception to the study of musical perception and emotion, focused on "trying to create bridges, between the two disciplines, and different ways of understanding musical experience."

She has been a distinguished lecturer in ethnomusicology at conferences and symposia, and in 2003 was selected as the Charles Seeger lecturer for which she delivered an address titled "Trancers and Deep Listeners." Becker received the Alan Merriam Prize from the Society for Ethnomusicology in 2005 for her book, Deep Listeners: Music, Emotion, and Trancing. She was named an Honorary Member of the Society for Ethnomusicology in 2010.

== See also ==
- Women in musicology

== Select bibliography ==
- "Time and Tune in Java", in The Imagination of Reality: Essays in Southeast Asian Coherence Systems, ed. Alton L. Becker and A.A. Yengoyan (Norwood, New Jersey: 1979), pp. 197–210.
- Becker, Judith; Becker, Alton L. (1979). "The Grammar of a Musical Genre, Srepegan". Journal of Music Theory. 23: 1–43. doi:10.2307/843692. JSTOR 843692.
- Judith Becker (1980). Traditional Music in Modern Java. Honolulu: Univ. of Hawaii Press. (based on dissertation, 1972)
- "A Southeast Asian Music Process: Thai thaw and Javanese irama". Ethnomusicology. 24. 1980.
- Becker, Judith; Becker, Alton L. (1981). "A Musical Icon: Power and Meaning in Javanese Gamelan Music". In W. Steiner (ed.). The Sign in Music and Literature. Austin. pp. 169–183.
- Becker, Judith (1986). "Is Western Art Music Superior?". Musical Quarterly. 72.
- Judith Becker (1988). "Earth, Fire, sakti and the Javanese gamelan". Ethnomusicology. 32 (3): 385–391. doi:10.2307/851938. JSTOR 851938.
- Judith Becker (1993). Gamelan Stories: Tantrism, Islam and Aesthetics in Central Java. Tempe, AZ.
- Becker, Judith (1993). "Exploring the Habitus of Listening". In Juslin, Patrick N. (ed.). Handbook of Music and Emotion: Theory, Research, Applications. Oxford University Press. pp. 127–157. doi:10.1093/acprof:oso/9780199230143.003.0006. ISBN 9780199230143.
- Becker, Judith (2001). "Anthropological perspectives on music and emotion". In Juslin, P.; Sloboda, J (eds.). Music and Emotion: Theory and Research. Oxford: Oxford University Press. pp. 135–160.
- Judith Becker (2004). Deep Listeners: Music, Emotion, and Trancing. Indianapolis and Bloomington: Indiana Univ. Press.
- Judith Becker (2009). "Ethnomusicology and Empiricism in the Twenty-First Century". Ethnomusicology. 53.
