= A.L. Becker Southeast Asian Literature in Translation Prize =

American award for Southeast Asian literature

The A.L. Becker Southeast Asian Literature in Translation Prize is awarded triennially by the Association for Asian Studies, for an outstanding translation of a work of Southeast Asian literature into English. It was established on the death of Alton L. Becker, in his memory.

== Eligibility and nomination ==
Books eligible for the prize are English-language translations of literary works originally written in Southeast Asian languages. Nominations are submitted by publishers, each of which may enter a limited number of titles per award cycle. Works may only be considered within one regional prize category per cycle.

== Winners ==
2012

Huỳnh Sanh Thông (honorary)

2013

Chris Baker and Pasuk Phongpaichit, translators of Khun Chang Khun Phaen

2016

Soledad Reyes, translator of What Now, Ricky by Rosario de Guzman Lingat.

2019

Stuart Robson, translator of The Old Javanese Ramayana; A New English Translation.

2022

Roger Nelson (translator), translator of A New Sun Rises Over the Old Land by Suon Sorin.

2025

Kong Rithdee, translator of Memories of the Memories of the Black Rose Cat, by Veeraporn Nitiprapha (River Books Press).

Honorable Mention: Tiffany Tsao, translator of Happy Stories, Mostly by Norman Erikson Pasaribu (Tilted Axis)
