= Kolab Pailin =

1936 novel by Nhok Them

- Author: Nhok Them
- Original title: កុលាបប៉ៃលិន (GD: Kolab Pailin)
- Language: Khmer
- Publication date: 1936 or 1943
- Publication place: Cambodia

Kolab Pailin (Khmer: កុលាបប៉ៃលិន [kolaːp pajlɨn]; lit. 'Rose of Pailin') is a Cambodian novel that was written by Nhok Them in 1936 or 1943. Along with Sophat and Phka Srapoun, Kolab Pailin is considered one of the three classic novels of modern Khmer literature. The story does not focus on any religious elements of Hinduism or Buddhism. It portrays the struggles of the Cambodian people during French colonial administration. The story centers on an orphan boy named "Chauchet" whose late father upon death sent him to Cambodia's northern province of Pailin to work at a diamond mine where he shows kindness and above all loyalty towards his employer. Although, it does not present any self-independence concept, it illustrates some ideas for young Cambodian women relating on how to choose their husband.

== Plot summary ==
In an old house, Choeum (ជឿម [cɨəm]), who is the father of Chauchet (ចៅចិត្រ [caw.cət]), is sick due to serious disease. He is being treated by a doctor named S'at (ស្អាត [sʔaːt]). Before dying, he tells his son to depend on his own to live like a Khmer proverb Attāhi Attano Nātho (អត្តាហិ អត្តនោ នាថោ, "One is one's own refuge").

After his father's death, Dr. S'at recommends work as a mine worker in Pailin with Luong Ratanasambath (ហ្លួងរតនសម្បត្តិ [luəŋ rɔətanasɑmbat])to Chauchet. When he gets the job, he works hard and is liked by other workers.

One night, Chauchet sings a song in his worker cottage. His voice impresses Khunneary (ឃុននារី [kʰunniəriː]), who is the only daughter of Luong Ratanasambath. She comes to meet Chauchet, but she retorts him when she knows that he is just a normal worker. However, he doesn't mind her and starts to love her.

In the next morning, Chauchet helps Son (សុន [son]), the chauffeur of Luong Ratanasambath, to repair the car. Then Son teaches Chauchet to drive. After that, Son asks permission from his master to be absent in driving for a short time because he is busy with his family and asks Chauchet to drive instead of him. Luong Ratanasambath agrees to his request.

One day, Chauchet drives his masters and Balat (បាឡាត់ [ɓaːlat]) to the market. Unfortunately, when he drives back, the car is broken. Thus, Balat blames him for this, though in reality he is jealous of Chauchet of being close with Khunneary.

They stay in the forest all night. Chauchet and Khunneary chat with each other and become closer. While chatting, some robbers appear and try to rob them. Chet fights with the robbers and protects his master. He defeats the robbers but gets wounded and is sent to the hospital. His courage makes Khunneary stop discriminating against him and start loving him. When his health becomes better, he is promoted to be the manager in the mine site.

One day, Balat brings Phan (ផាន់ [pʰan]) to buy the gems. Luong Ratanasambath brings him to see the mine site and leave Khunneary home alone. Balat tries to rape her, but Chauchet comes and helps her. He fights with Balat and saves her. Luong Ratanasambath is furious, warns them to be never there again, and lets them go.

After seeing a lot of advantages, commitment and honesty of Chauchet, Luong Ratanasambath allows him to marry his daughter, and they live happily.
