= Nguyễn Chí Thiện =

Vietnamese-American dissident, activist and poet

- Born: 27 February 1939; Hà Nội, Tonkin, French Indochina (now Hanoi, Vietnam)
- Died: 2 October 2012 (aged 73); Santa Ana, California, U.S.
- Occupation: Poet
- Known for: Poetry and prose

Nguyễn Chí Thiện (27 February 1939 – 2 October 2012) was a North Vietnamese dissident, activist and poet who spent a total of twenty-seven years as a political prisoner of the communist governments of both North Vietnam and of post-1975 Vietnam, before being released and allowed to join the large Overseas Vietnamese community in the United States.

== Biography ==
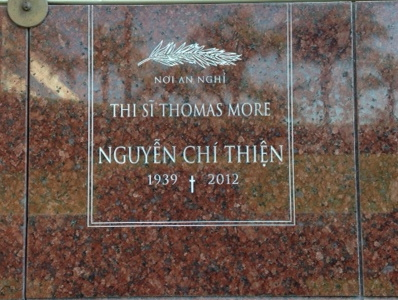
Headstone marking the resting place for the poet Nguyễn Chí Thiện at the Christ Cathedral in Garden Grove, California.

Chí Thiện was educated in private academies and was a supporter of Viet Minh revolutionaries in his early life. In 1960, however, he challenged the official history of World War II – that the Soviet Union had defeated the Imperial Japanese Army in Manchukuo, ending the war – while teaching a high school history class. Chí Thiện told the class that the United States defeated Japan when they dropped the atomic bombs on Hiroshima and Nagasaki. Because of this, was sentenced to two years imprisonment, and served three years and six months in re-education camps. There, Chí Thiện began composing poems in prison and committed them to memory. After a brief release in 1966, he was jailed again for composing politically irreverent poems. He denied the charges, and spent another eleven years and five months in labor camps.

In 1977, two years after Saigon fell, Chí Thiện and other political prisoners were released to make room for defeated officers from the South Vietnamese military. Chí Thiện used his release to write down the poems he had thus far committed solely to memory.

Two days after Bastille Day, on 16 July 1979, after having been thwarted from his initial plan to enter the French embassy because of the closely guarded compound, Chí Thiện dashed into the British embassy in Hanoi with his manuscript of four hundred poems and the cover letter drafted in French as it was meant for the original destination.

British Foreign Office diplomats welcomed him and promised to send his manuscript out of the country. When he left, the Vietnamese secret police (MPS) agents were already waiting and arrested him at the embassy gate. He was imprisoned yet again, this time in the Hỏa Lò Prison (known among American POWs as the "Hanoi Hilton") for six years, then six more years at other prisons in northern Vietnam.

During this imprisonment, Chí Thiện's poems which made their way to the West were translated into English by Huỳnh Sanh Thông of Yale University. The work won the International Poetry Award in Rotterdam in 1985. He was also adopted as a prisoner of conscience by Amnesty International in 1986. Twelve years after bringing his manuscript to the British Embassy, he was released from jail. He lived in Hanoi under close surveillance by the authorities, but his international followers also kept an eye on Thiện.

Human Rights Watch honored him in 1995. That year he was also permitted to emigrate to the United States with the intervention of Noboru Masuoka, a retired U.S. Air Force colonel and career military officer who was drafted into the U.S. Army following internment in Heart Mountain camp for Japanese Americans in 1945.

He immediately wrote Hoa Dia Nguc II, poems composed in his memory (as he was not allowed pen and paper in prison) from 1979 to 1988. They were published in bilingual editions (Vietnamese and English) then again in its Vietnamese entirety in 2006.

In 1998, Chí Thiện was awarded a fellowship from the International Parliament of Writers. He lived in France for three years, writing the Hoa Lo Stories, a prose narrative of his experiences in prison. These were translated and published in English as the Hoa Lo / Hanoi Hilton Stories by Yale Southeast Asia Studies in 2007.

Chí Thiện's original manuscript was returned to him in early 2008 by the widow of Prof. Patrick Honey of the University of London, who had shared the material with many Vietnamese exiles, but always guarded the original work.

Chí Thiện died in Santa Ana, California on 2 October 2012.

== Awards and honors ==
- 1985 Rotterdam International Poetry Prize
- 1989 PEN/Barbara Goldsmith Freedom to Write Award

== Sources ==
- Hoa Lo, Hanoi Hilton Stories by Nguyen Chí Thiện. Yale Southeast Asia Studies, 2007. ISBN 978-0-938692-89-8
- Hai Truyen Tu, Two Prison Life Stories; Nguyen Chí Thiện's prose in bilingual text. Allies for Freedom publishers, 2008. ISBN 978-0-9773638-6-5
