= Ly Theam Teng =

Sino-Khmer writer

- លី ធាមតេង
- Born: May 15, 1930; Kampong Siem, Kampong Cham, French Indochina
- Died: 1978 (aged 47–48); Democratic Kampuchea
- Occupations: Writer, intellectual
- Organization: Khmer Writers Association
- Notable work: Outline of the Development of Khmer literature (1972)
- Spouse: Ly Thirak
- Children: 5

Ly Theam Teng (Khmer: លី ធាមតេង; Chinese: 李添丁) was a Sino-Khmer literatus who authored many books including novels which have become classics of Cambodian literature, before he died of exhaustion under the Khmer Rouge in 1978.

== Biography ==
Ly Theam Teng was born of Khmer-Chinese parents on May 15, 1930 in Kampong Siem District, of Kampong Cham Province. His father was named Ly Mong (李猛) and his mother was named Sok Kim (宋金). He married Ly Thirak, whose maiden name was Eam Kim Houy (穗金惠) and together they had 5 sons and daughters.

In the 1940s, while he was carrying out his research at the Buddhist Institute, Éveline Porée-Maspéro called him to be a member of the Commission for the Study of the Cambodian Customs and Practises.

He later founded the Khmer Writers Association, establishing an agreement to send their bi-monthly publication, Ecrivains Khmers ("Khmer Writers") to the Library of Congress. He was one of the first contributors to the Kambuja suriyā, the first peer-reviewed Khmer journal of literary criticism.

In 1958, he travelled to the Soviet Union to attend the Afro-Asian Writers' Conference in Tashkent held by the Afro-Asian Writers' Bureau, which was an offshoot the Afro-Asian People's Solidarity Organization in line with the non-aligned vision developed at the Bandung conference and which Prince Sihanouk supported. It was an opportunity for this Khmer intellectual to mesh with other Asian intellectuals such as Yash Pal from India or Mao Dun from China, as well as Black American intellectual W. E. B. Du Bois who was among those who gave impactful speeches.

In June 1962, he was invited by the China Writers Association to travel to China where he was received with honours by Chinese officials such as Wan Li and writers such as Yang Shuo. In 1966, Ly Theam Teng published a biography of Krom Ngoy with information from Ngoy's descendants who had maintained his poetic tradition.

In 1972, he wrote what appears to be the first comprehensive history of Cambodian literature in both French and English which he entitled Outline of the Development of Khmer literature. His work was instrumental in defining a new canon of Cambodian literature.

== Legacy: the Chinese influence of Khmer literature ==
Ly Theam Teng with his ethnic background is representative of the long tradition of Chinese influence on Cambodian literature as identified by Cambodian scholar Khing Hoc Dy. As many of his generations, they were well read in Chinese, Vietnamese and even French literature though the connections of French Indochina: "what is important is that this Sino-Vietnamese literature made them painfully conscious of the lack of a similar output in the Cambodian language."

== Works ==
- រឿង រំដួលភ្នំគូលេន, ប្រលោមលោក, ភ្នំពេញ, ១៩៥៤ (Phnom Penh, 1954)
- រឿង រស្មីចិត្ត, ប្រលោមលោក, ភ្នំពេញ, ១៩៥៥(១៩៥៤) (Phnom Penh, published 1955, written 1954)
- រឿង ព្រះបរមរាជា, ប្រលោមលោក, ភ្នំពេញ, ១៩៥៥ (Phnom Penh, 1955)
- រឿង សិរីស្វេតច្ឆត្រ, ប្រលោមលោក, ភ្នំពេញ, ១៩៥៥, (១៩៥៤) (Phnom Penh, published 1955, written 1954)
- រឿង សុបិន្តពេលយប់, ប្រលោមលោក, ភ្នំពេញ, ១៩៥៥ (Phnom Penh, 1955)
- ពង្សាវតារខ្មែរសង្ខេប, សិក្សាកថា, ១៩៥៩ (1959)
- អក្សរសាស្រ្តខ្មែរ, សិក្សាកថា, ១៩៦០ (1960)
- ពង្សាវតារប្រទេសកម្ពុជា, សិក្សាកថា, ១៩៦៤ (1964)
- រឿង ឆ្លងពពកស្អាប់, ប្រលោមលោក, ភ្នំពេញ, ១៩៦៦ (1966)
- រឿង នារី និងបុប្ផា, ប្រលោមលោក, ភ្នំពេញ, ១៩៦៧ (1967)
- វិវត្តន៍នៃអក្សរសាស្រ្តខ្មែរ, សិក្សាកថា, ១៩៧២ (1972)
- បកប្រែ អត្ថបទ ប្រពៃណីអ្នកស្រុកចេនឡា ពីភាសាចិនរបស់លោកជីវ តាក្វាន់
- សៀវភៅ អ្នកនិពន្ធល្បីឈ្មោះរបស់ខ្មែរ (Outline of the Development of Khmer literature), សិក្សាកថា, ភ្នំពេញ, ឆ្នាំ១៩៧២ (1972)

== Bibliography ==
- សៀវភៅ ជីវប្រវត្តិអ្នកនិពន្ធខ្មែរ, ជ័យ ចាប,១៩៨៨
- សៀវភៅ អក្សរសិល្ប៍ខ្មែរ សតវត្សទី២០, ឃីង ហុកឌី, ២០០៧
- លោកស្រី លី ធីរៈ ភរិយាលោកលី ធាមតេង
