= Stuart Robson (translator) =

Australian translator and scholar of Javanese and Malay literature

Stuart Robson is an Australian translator and scholar of Javanese and Malay literature.

He first studied at the University of Sydney and completed his PhD at Leiden University in 1971. He then taught Javanese there from 1977 to 1990 before returning to Australia in 1991, where he was an associate professor at Monash University before retiring in 2001.

His translation of The Old Javanese Ramayana won the A.L. Becker Southeast Asian Literature in Translation Prize in 2019 and was nominated for the 2016 Medal for Excellence in Translation. He also wrote influential textbooks and dictionaries for learning the Javanese language.
