= Robert B. Jones (linguist) =

American linguist

- Born: Robert Burton Jones; January 31, 1920; Dallas, Texas
- Died: November 23, 2007 (aged 87); Ithaca, New York
- Education: Southern Methodist University; University of California, Berkeley
- Occupation: Linguist
- Employer: Cornell University

Robert Burton "RB" Jones (January 31, 1920 – November 23, 2007) was a linguist whose research focused on the South East Asian languages, in particular Karen, Burmese and Thai. He was a professor at Cornell University.

Jones studied music as an undergraduate at Southern Methodist University, particularly focusing on the organ. In 1941, he joined the United States Army for World War II and studied Japanese in the army. After the war he began he resumed his studies, this time at University of California, Berkeley, graduating 1947.

He finished a Ph.D. in Linguistics at Berkeley in 1958 under Mary Haas. He travelled on a Ford Foundation grant to Burma in 1957–58.

Jones taught at Georgetown University, the Foreign Service Institute of the State Department, and in 1955, started at Cornell University.

Jones retired from Cornell in 1986.

== Publications ==
- Jones, Robert B. (1953). The Burmese writing system. Washington, DC : American Council of Learned Soc..
- Jones, Robert B. (1961). Karen Linguistic Studies: Description, comparison, and texts. Berkeley: University of California Press.
- Jones, Robert B. (1970). "Classifier Constructions in Southeast Asia.". Journal of the American Oriental Society. 90.1: 1-12
- Jones, Robert B. (1972). “Sketch of Burmese dialects.” M. Estellie Smith (ed.), Studies in linguistics in honor or George L. Trager. The Hague: Mouton. 413-422.
- Jones, Robert B. (1974). Rev. of John Okell, A reference grammar of colloquial Burmese. Language 50. 1: 205-7.
- Jones, Robert B. (1975). Rev. of Roop, An introduction to the Burmese writing system. Journal of Asian Studies 32. 1: 205-6.
- Jones, Robert B. (1975). The question of Karen linguistic affiliation. 8th International Conference on Sino-Tibetan Language and Linguistics.
- Jones, Robert B. (1976). "Sketch of Burmese dialects." Studies in Honor of George L. Trager. M. Estellie Smith, ed. The Hague: Mouton. 413-422
- Jones, Robert B. (1976). "Prolegomena to a phonology of Old Burmese". Southeast Asian History and Historiography: essays presented to D. G. E. Hall C. D. Cowan and O. W. Wolters, eds. Ithaca: Cornell Univ Press. 43-50
- Jones, Robert B. (1986). "Pitch Register Languages." Contributions to Sino-Tibetan studies. John McCoy, Timothy Light, eds. Leiden: E. J. Brill.
- Jones, Robert B. (1988). "Proto-Burmese as a test of reconstruction." On language: rhetorica, phonologica, syntactica: a Festschrift for Robert P. Stockwell from his friends and colleagues. Caroline Duncan-Rose and Theo Vennemann, eds. London: Routledge. 203-211
