= Jiang Tao (poet) =

Chinese poet (born 1970)

Jiang Tao 姜濤 (b. 1970 in Tianjin) is a Chinese poet and Professor of Chinese at Peking University.

He studied biomedical engineering at Tsinghua University, working on student poetry publications, before moving to Peking University to study literature.

He has produced numerous collections of poetry, literary history, and textbooks.
