= Khmer Writers Association =

Cambodian writers' organization

- សមាគមអ្នកនិពន្ធខ្មែរ
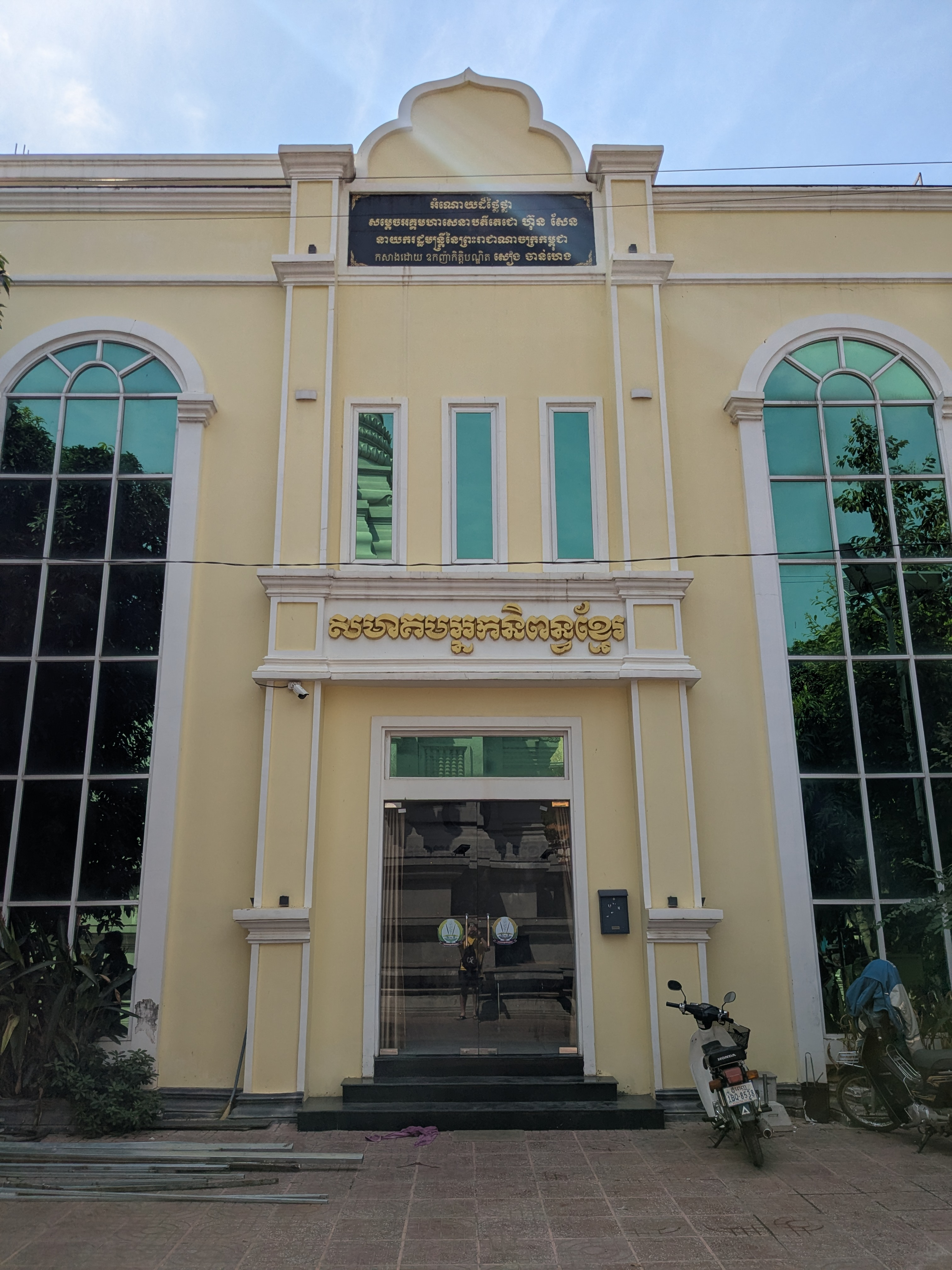
- Abbreviation: KWA
- Founded: 1954
- Type: Non-governmental organization
- Headquarters: St. 244, Phnom Penh, Cambodia

The Khmer Writers Association (KWA; Khmer: សមាគមអ្នកនិពន្ធខ្មែរ, ស.អ.ខ.), also known as the Association of Khmer Writers, the Association des Ecrivains Khmers, or the Association of Cambodian Writers, was established in 1954 or 1956, and re-established in 1993 as a non-governmental organization. Formerly located at 465 Monivong Blvd, it is currently located at St. 244, Phnom Penh, Cambodia.

The organization encourages and promotes writing while offering training programs and competitions. Its authors try to promote a new direction to literature, introducing new themes, such as the abandonment of morality incompatible with modern life; developing new genres, such as theatre nouveau; and providing translations, such as The Arabian Nights, as part of a "didactic and diverse" genre. According to Smyth, the establishment of the KWA helped complete the "institutionalization of Khmer literature" as, through the 1960s, it became the vehicle for writing and publishing textbooks on Khmer literature and literary criticism. In the 2000s, the organization's focus has shifted; it provides training programs for writing poetry and film screenplays.

== History ==
Rim Kin (1911–1959), the author of the first modern prose published novel in Cambodia, was president from 1955 until 1957. Only one of the organization's ten founding members was a woman, Suy Hieng. Sam Thang and Hell Sumphea served as subsequent presidents. In the late 1950s, Ly Theam Teng, the association's secretary, established an agreement to send their bi-monthly publication, Ecrivains Khmers ("Khmer Writers") to the Library of Congress.

In 1970, according to its president Trinh Hoanh, there were 178 members representing most of the Cambodian writers. Hoanh was still president in the mid-1970s. Destroyed under Democratic Kampuchea, the association was re-established in 1993 by two former members, You Bo and Sou Chamran, with King Norodom Sihanouk serving as honorary president. Bo served as president from 1994 to 1996, Chey Chap succeeded him, and Bo became president again in 1998.

Starting in 1995, the KWA organised the annual Khmer Literature Festival. It also staged competitions for novel and poetry writing, and gave out two awards: the Preah Sihanouk Reach Award and the 7 January Award. The topic of the PSRA competition was national unification and peace, while the topic of the January competition was national development. Lacking funds, the festival and awards did not continue after 2000.

As of 2002, there were 192 members with approximately half being professional writers.

== Notable people ==
Pal Vannariraks, a female Cambodian writer of social and sentimental novels, won first prize in the 1989 Seventh of January literature competition. At a 2009 University of Cambodia's interview with 18-year-old Nuon Pichsoudeny, the youngest student writer in the Cambodia and the author of four published novels, she stated she was a current member of the KWA.

Membership is not limited to residents of Cambodia. Nada Marinković (1921–1998), a Yugoslavian journalist and author, was a past member. Pech Sangwawann, the short-story writer who fled to France and founded the Association des Ecrivains Khmers a l'Etranger ("Association of Khmer Writers Abroad"), was a long-time member of the KWA before 1975.

== Criticism ==
A 1966 catalog of the KWA works includes the Buddhist genres of Pali and Dhamma. Some of the works, characterized as being interpretations by "modernist intellectuals", may not represent the view of all Cambodian Buddhists.
