= Rim Kin =

Cambodian writer

- Native name: រីម គីន
- Born: November 8, 1911; Phnom Penh, French Cambodia
- Died: January 28, 1959 (aged 47); Cambodia
- Occupation: Author
- Notable works: Sophat (1938)

Rim Kin (Khmer: រីម គីន; 8 November 1911–28 January 1959) was a Cambodian writer, and one of the founders of Cambodian modern literature. He was the author of Sophat (Khmer: សូផាត, 1938), the first published novel in Cambodia to be written in prose rather than the customary verse form. It became a 1964 movie of the same name. In 1935, the weekly Cambodian newspaper Ratri Thnai Saur (Khmer: រាត្រីថ្ងៃសៅរ៍) was founded and it hosted the first modern serial stories of Kin. From 1955 through 1957, Kin was the first president of the Khmer Writers' Association.

== Partial works ==
- 1938, Sophat (រឿងសូផាត)
- 1943, Samapheavi (សមាភាវី)
