= Philippe Paquet (writer) =

Belgian historian, biographer and Sinologist

- Born: September 3, 1960 (age 65); Namur, Belgium
- Occupations: Journalist, sinologist, writer
- Writing career
- Language: French
- Genres: Essay, biography
- Notable works: Madame Chiang Kai-shek. Un siècle d'histoire de la Chine; Simon Leys. Navigateur entre les mondes
- Notable awards: Prix de la Biographie (Histoire) of the Académie française (2011); Prix des Ambassadeurs (2011); Grand Prix de la Biographie politique (2011); Grand Prix biennal de la Biographie du Cercle Gaulois (2012); Prix de la Fondation culturelle franco-taïwanaise under the auspices of the Académie des sciences morales et politiques of the Institut de France (2012); Prix Fondation Martine Aublet (2016)

Philippe Paquet (born 1960) is a Belgian historian, biographer and Sinologist. Born in Namur, he has written for La Libre Belgique since 1984 and authored acclaimed biographies of Madame Chiang Kai-Shek (Soong Mei-ling), which was reviewed in Le Monde and various other newspapers and journals. His 2010 biography of Belgian-Australian intellectual Simon Leys was described as showing a complex man on a hero's journey, and as "a vast omnibus of a work". The biography won several prizes, including the Prix Fondation Martine Aublet and the Prix Femina Essai.
