= China News =

China News may refer to:

- Taiwan News, formerly known as China News ( 1949 ~ 1999), English language newspaper in Taiwan
- China News (CCTV), a news program of CCTV-4
- China News Service, state-owned news agency in the People's Republic of China
- China News Analysis
