= The Emperor's New Clothes (2001 film) =

2001 film by Alan Taylor

- Theatrical release poster
- Directed by: Alan Taylor
- Screenplay by: Kevin Molony; Alan Taylor; Herbie Wave
- Based on: The Death of Napoleon by Simon Leys
- Produced by: Uberto Pasolini
- Starring: Ian Holm; Iben Hjejle; Tim McInnerny
- Cinematography: Alessio Gelsini Torresi
- Edited by: Masahiro Hirakubo
- Music by: Rachel Portman
- Production companies: FilmFour Productions; Redwave Films; Mikado Films; Senator Film
- Distributed by: Senator Film (Germany); Mikado Films (Italy); FilmFour Distributors (United Kingdom)
- Release dates: 11 August 2001 (Locarno Festival); 7 December 2001 (Italy); 30 January 2004 (UK)
- Running time: 107 minutes
- Countries: Germany; Italy; United Kingdom
- Language: English

The Emperor's New Clothes is a 2001 historical drama film directed by Alan Taylor and based on the 1986 novel The Death of Napoleon by Simon Leys. The film stars Ian Holm as Napoleon Bonaparte (his third performance as the military and political leader, after 1974's Napoleon and Love and 1981's Time Bandits), Iben Hjejle, and Tim McInnerny. The plot imagines an alternate history in which Napoleon escapes his exile on Saint Helena. Although set in Paris, the film was mostly shot in Turin, Italy.

== Plot ==
In 1821, Napoleon Bonaparte, after six years in exile on the isle of Saint Helena, has a plan to escape. Switching places with lowly French deckhand Eugene Lenormand, Napoleon will make his way to Paris, at which time Eugene will announce the switch, allowing Napoleon to reclaim his throne.

However, the plan quickly goes awry: the ship Napoleon is serving on abruptly changes its itinerary and docks in Belgium instead of France. Having to make his way to France by land, and gaining an appalling look at the tourist trap the battlefield of Waterloo has become, he is finally met at the French border by a loyal agent, Sgt. Bommell, formerly of the Imperial Guard. Bommell gives him the name of another agent in Paris he can trust, Lt. Truchaut.

Arriving in Paris, Napoleon is surprised to find that Truchaut has recently died. Passing himself off as an old comrade of the Lieutenant, Napoleon accepts the hospitality of Truchaut's widow, Nicole, whom everyone calls "Pumpkin", and makes the acquaintance of her other lodger, Dr. Lambert and her adopted young son, Gerard.

The crucial flaw in the plan reveals itself when, back on Saint Helena, Eugene decides he likes living in the relative luxury of Napoleon's exile, and refuses to reveal the switch. Napoleon's French entourage find themselves unexpectedly powerless, as Eugene stuffs his face with sweets, dictates his own bawdy version of Napoleon's official memoirs, and even manages to convince his British captors that he is the true Napoleon.

With no news from Saint Helena, Napoleon is drawn into Pumpkin's life. When her fruit-selling business is on the brink of failure, he applies his own talents for planning and organization, and the business becomes prosperous again.

As affection develops between Napoleon and Pumpkin, Dr Lambert, who had designs on Pumpkin himself, jealously searches for some kind of dirt on "Eugene". Going through his bedroom, Lambert is shocked to find a small cameo portrait of Napoleon's young son, and realizes who "Eugene" really is.

On Saint Helena, Eugene abruptly drops dead of some kind of stomach complaint (in real-life, Napoleon reportedly died of gastric cancer). Realizing that the dead man on the island is not Napoleon, the British garrison commander lays out their options: either they announce the fraud, and face heinous punishment, or else maintain the illusion, and all will be well. "Gentlemen," he tells them, "What we have here is a dead emperor".

When "Napoleon's" death is announced throughout France, the real Napoleon abruptly remembers his original plan and announces to Pumpkin that it is time for him to take his rightful place on the French throne. To his fury, Pumpkin is horrified and dismisses him as delusional, pleading that she loves Eugene, but hates Napoleon for taking her husband away.

With no loyalist agent in Paris to vouch for his identity, Napoleon finds himself an Emperor without an army, or a friend. He is reduced to going to Dr Lambert, who he realizes stole the portrait, and demanded it back. When he demands to be told "who I am", Lambert retorts, "I will show you."

In revenge for being beaten to Pumpkin's affections, Lambert lures him onto the grounds of a sanitorium, where it seems every patient is dressed up as Napoleon, and pretending to be him. Lambert withdraws, expecting him to be rounded up by the attendants, but a shaken Napoleon escapes the grounds by climbing over the wall, suffering a nasty cut on his hand from the chevaux de frise on top.

Emotionally and physically exhausted, he returns home to Pumpkin's house. She lovingly tends his wounds, and whispers in his ear, "you are my Napoleon."

While Gerard is looking at a pictorial account of Napoleon's life on a magic lantern, he tells the story of what really happened. It seems that Gerard, if no one else, believes his story.

Deciding that he is happiest living a simple life with Pumpkin, Napoleon destroys all his mementos of his former life, except his old Imperial Guard uniform, which he leaves at the local military post as a gift for Sgt. Bommell, with a message that "Eugene Lenormand has moved on."

An after-note states that Napoleon Bonaparte lived out the rest of his life in Paris and was buried next to Pumpkin; while Eugene Lenormand's body was brought back to Paris and interred with high honors in Les Invalides.

== Cast ==
- Ian Holm as Napoleon Bonaparte / Able Seaman Eugene Lenormand
- Iben Hjejle as Nicole 'Pumpkin' Truchaut
- Tim McInnerny as Dr Lambert
- Tom Watson as Gerard
- Nigel Terry as Montholon
- Hugh Bonneville as Bertrand
- Murray Melvin as Antommarchi
- Eddie Marsan as Louis Marchand
- Clive Russell as Sergeant Justin Bommel
- Bob Mason as Captain Nicholls
- Trevor Cooper as Leaud
- Niall O'Brien as Bosun
- Hayley Carmichael as Adele Raffin
- Moya Brady as Woman
- Philip McGough as English tourist
- Tim Barlow as Bargee
- Tony Vogel as British sergeant
- Russell Tovey as Recruit
- John McGlynn as Gendarme

== Reception ==
The film received generally positive reception, holding a 73% "fresh" rating on Rotten Tomatoes based on 85 reviews.

In June 2006, Simon Leys stated in the afterword of a new edition of Death of Napoleon that "This latter avatar [The Emperor's New Clothes], by the way, was both sad and funny: sad, because Napoleon was interpreted to perfection by an actor (Ian Holm) whose performance made me dream of what could have been achieved had the producer and director bothered to read the book."
