= Gao Yuan =

Gao Yuan may refer to:

- Gao Yuan (高元), the legendary progenitor of the Gao clan
- Gao Yuan (高原), the author of Born Red
- Yeong-yang of Goguryeo (died 618), or Gao Yuan, king of Goguryeo
