= The Revenge of Heaven =

The revenge of heaven
- Authors: Miriam London, Ta-Ling Lee
- Language: English
- Genre: Research report, Cultural Revolution report, Communism in China
- Publisher: Ballantine Books (p/b)
- Publication date: 1972
- Publication place: United States
- Media type: Print (paperback)
- Pages: 438
- OCLC: 869087849

The Revenge of Heaven, subtitled Journal of A Young Chinese, is a documentary novel about the story of a sixteen/seventeen year old high-school student from Amoy in Southern Fujian, People's Republic of China (PRC), written by two American scholars, Miriam London and Ta-Ling Lee.

The student participated as a Red Guard in Mao Tse-tung's Cultural Revolution from its inception. In July 1968, together with his second elder brother, he escaped to the Republic of China, Taiwan by swimming almost eight miles with the ebb current from Amoy to the offshore island Tatan which belongs to the Chinmen Archipelago. He subsequently attracted the attention of one of the Chinese assistants of Ivan D. London, psychologist and professor at Brooklyn College, City University of New York in the United States of America (USA) who brought the former Red Guard into communication with him. Together with Miriam London, his wife and long-term collaborator, Professor London was conducting a large-scale research project on the social system of the PRC based upon refugee interviews. He followed up with the young man. Over the period of approximately 18 months the London's were able to collect source material from about 300 hours of interviews with him and additional statements he submitted in written form amounting to about 500 000 Chinese characters. When Professor London and his wife decided to publish the findings and research insights they had gained from that material, a pseudonym was required to protect their informant's family in the PRC. Having carefully studied their respondent during the 18 months of working increasingly closer with him they intended to present the former Red Guard to the public as "a real and genuine character" and, therefore, chose the autobiographical first person account with a narrator fictitiously reading from his journal as the format of their research report. Ken Ling, as the former Red Guard was henceforth called, on the one hand contributed to the book as the author of all the raw material it based upon and for that was given credit by Ivan D. London in the preface to the original American publication. On the other hand, however, as the protagonist of the story "The Revenge of Heaven" reading from his journal and looking back on his Red Guard activities Ken Ling appears, of course, as the person studied by the American psychologist. He is certainly not the author of that study. The research report "The Revenge of Heaven" presented in the literary style of a novel was prepared by Miriam London with the assistance of the London's long-term collaborator Ta-Ling Lee.

== Content ==
The protagonist Ken Ling was the youngest of six siblings three of whom had already finished university and made their living far away from home in the North of China. His father, a middle-class bank employee, died of an illness when he was only one year old. He became the favorite of his mother, a factory worker, who continued to baby him even as he became older.

He was baptized and his mother encouraged him to adopt the spirit of Christian values and virtues. His teachers in the Eighth Middle School in Amoy liked him, viewing him as well-bred, gifted and eager to learn. Despite his middle-class background—not considered a good one in Communist China—his prospects to enter university seemed to be bright.

A student becomes a Red Guard

However, everything changed on June 1, 1966—Children's Day—when Ken Ling was awakened early in the morning by incomprehensible noises from the public loudspeaker system. After going to school and learning classes were cancelled, he returned home. When he came back to school in the afternoon to write letters of "determination" and "challenge" he was caught up in the maelstrom of one of Mao's campaigns—soon to be called the "Great Proletarian Cultural Revolution"—turning the well-mannered, diligent young man into a ruthless, rather presumptuous Red Guard bully. No longer accepting any authority above himself, with the exception of his mother who was unaware of her son's outside activities, he and his classmates believed that revolution justified whatever actions they undertook to destroy the Four Olds –old thoughts, old culture, old customs and old habits. They humiliated, tortured and killed their teachers with the utmost cruelty. Beyond this, they terrorized their teachers’ families, raiding their homes to destroy books, musical instruments, paintings and other cultural valuables and stealing everything that caught their eyes. However, this was only the beginning of student violence that was soon redirected against the local leadership of the ruling Chinese Communist Party (CCP), the city's institutional framework and against the citizens of Amoy as a whole.

Journeys to Peking and the North of China

With the emergence of organizational structures within the Red Guard movement Ken Ling gained increasing authority and power. After massive power struggles at the Fujian provincial level, he was appointed head of a delegation of ten of his Amoy middle school classmates traveling free of charge to Peking to link-up with Red Guards from other parts of the country, exchange revolutionary experiences and ultimately participate in a rally of a million Red Guards where Mao Tse-tung would appear in person. At the end of this almost three-month journey, Ken Ling and his fellow travellers also attended a mass interrogation involving up to hundred thousand people against Wang Kuang-mei, the wife of the then President of the PRC, Liu Shao-ch’i. For three days they inspected the embassy district of the capital, undertook a number of sightseeing tours in Peking itself, and traveled to other provinces in the Northeast. They even (accidentally) got as far to the Northwest as Lanchou.

At the peak of power

Returning home to Amoy in January 1967, Ken Ling found that just as in Shanghai, the movement to set up communes – influenced by the model of the Paris Commune – was in full swing. Because of his Shanghai experience, after only a few days visit to that city, the seventeen year old was immediately recognized as an expert and appointed director general of all 147 factories of the newly established Amoy commune with its 730,000 inhabitants. This included 8000 students stationed in the factories who were under his command to "work toward the goal of increased production". Ken Ling had reached the peak of his rise to power.

The sudden fall

Ken Ling was well aware that the communal effort was little more than an illusion given the constant infighting among powerful stakeholders. Further, an opposing faction within the cultural revolutionary movement, once almost driven into insignificance, was recovering from its defeat and raising new forces with the implicit support of the military. From February, the People's Liberation Army (PLA) openly moved in and took over the Amoy city government forcing Ken Ling to temporarily go underground.

During the second half of 1967 the power struggle in Amoy increasingly assumed the magnitude of a civil war and in that context Ken Ling lost his sweetheart, Mei-mei who was a passionate fighter for the cause of Mao's "Cultural Revolution". She was gunned down when she tried to rescue a co-fighter, who as it turned out afterwards had not even been wounded. Ken Ling was devastated, wondering if her death was the revenge of Heaven –i.e., the revenge of the mythical force behind China's traditional rulers who were the guardians of the ″Four Olds″ –old thoughts, old culture, old customs and old habits.

At the same time, it became more evident, that the ″Great Proletarian Cultural Revolution″ would end and give way to the reestablishment of order under the control of the PLA.

With the loss of Mei-mei, his disillusionment and a highly uncertain future, Ken Ling decided it was time to leave the PRC. He and his second elder brother, who had already been considering leaving the country for a long time, started to explore ways and means to escape to "another world". In the evening of July 19, 1968, they finally met at the beach to start their swim to Tatan Island.

== Publications ==
=== Editions in five languages ===
The first edition was published 1972 in English in the United States and the United Kingdom. A Chinese translation of the manuscript appeared in Hong Kong the same year, a German edition in 1974, a Thai edition in 1976 and a French edition in 1981, respectively. A reprint of the Chinese translation of "The Revenge of Heaven", under a new title with completely modified attributions and prefaces, was issued in Taiwan 2016.

- The Revenge of Heaven. Journal of a young Chinese. Ken Ling. English text prepared by Miriam London and Ta-Ling Lee. G. P. Putnam's Sons, New York (USA) 1972.
  - The Revenge of Heaven. Journal of a young Chinese. Ken Ling. English text prepared by Miriam London and Ta-Ling Lee. Ballantine Books, New York (USA) 1972, SBN 345–02985–2–150
- Red Guard: from schoolboy to “Little General” in Mao’s China. Ken Ling. English text prepared by Miriam London and Ta-Ling Lee. Macdonald, London (United Kingdom) 1972, ISBN 0-356-04169-7.
- 天讎: 一個中國青年的自述 Tian chou: yi ge Zhongguo qingnian de zishu, translated from the American original by Ms. Ting Kuang-sheng with the assistance of Liu K'un-sheng, Hsin-ching ch′uan-po Company, Hong Kong 1972
- Miriam London, Li Ta-ling: Maos kleiner General. Die Geschichte des Rotgardisten Ken Ling. Translated by Inge Neske. dtv Verlagsgesellschaft, Munich (Germany) 1974, ISBN 3-423-01024-X, ISBN 978-3-423-01024-5 (2nd edition 1982)
- Thai edition of "The Revenge of Heaven". หลินเกิ้นผู้พิฆาตสี่เก่า (Destroyer of the Four Olds), Translated and compiled by Boonkerd Nao Siam, Bangkok (Thailand) 1976.
- La vengeance du ciel. Un jeune Chinois dans la Révolution culturelle. Translated by Pierre Barroux, Hervé Denès and Albert Schmidt, Publication Robert Laffont, Paris (France) 1981, ISBN 2-221-00624-0.
- 從前從前有個紅衛兵 Cong-qian cong-qian yo ge hong-wei-ping. The Story of a Red Guard, Ken Ling zuo-zhe, Da Guei Wen-Hua Publishing House, Taipei 2016, ISBN 978-986-213-675-1.

=== Different titles ===
The title of the original American publication, maintained by the French edition, refers to the "Mandate of Heaven" as the authorising myth of imperial rule in China and places the liaison between Ken Ling and his fellow Red Guard sweetheart in the center of the story. The title of the German and British editions focuses upon the general topic of the story, the Red Guards of the "Cultural Revolution" who were often referred to as Mao's "little Generals". The Chinese characters for Revenge of Heaven (天讎) and the protagonist's pseudonym "Ken Ling" (凌耿) were decided upon by Ta-Ling Lee and the two interpreters, Ms. Ting Kuang-sheng and Karl Kunseng Liu.

The title of the Thai edition, "Destroyer of the Four Olds″, focuses upon the iconoclastic activities of the Red Guards.

The title of the 2016 Taiwan edition, "Once upon a Time there was a Red Guard", spotlights Ken Ling as the main player, augmented by two prefaces, focusing on Guo Kunren who had been given the name Ken Ling for the purpose of the publication of the research report of the London research team, and a preface of Guo Kunren himself that may be understood as an epilogue on his post-Cultural Revolution life in Taiwan and the USA.

=== Ambiguous authorship attributions ===
The unorthodox approach used by the Londons for presenting their research report, in which oral and written statements of a respondent were processed into a novel wherein the respondent plays the role of the story's narrator (named Ken Ling), fostered a basic ambiguity regarding its authorship. This apparently stemmed from the Londons’ willingness to share the credits of the publication with the respondent.

The front cover of the American original and the English edition places the name Ken Ling separately beneath the book's subtitle. This placement resulted in the chance of misinterpretation; specifically, while the intent was for the name to simply be a second subtitle, it could be interpreted as representing the novel's actual author. The first page in the interior places the name Ken Ling in large capital letters in the middle of the page between the title and a conspicuous annotation reading: ″English text prepared by Miriam London and Ta-Ling Lee" with both names also printed in large capital letters. According to the attributions the copyright is held by Dr. Ivan London and Miriam London. The sole preface is signed by Ivan D. London, Director of Research, Miriam London, Research Associate and Ta-Ling Lee, Research Associate. The front cover of the 1972 Chinese translation, which appeared briefly after the American original carried the names of the two interpreters Ms. Ting Kuang-sheng and Liu Kunsheng, implicitly indicating that there was no Chinese original, and the name Ken Ling as „yuan zhu" (source material writer). In their preface, the two interpreters gratefully acknowledge Professor Ta-Ling Lee, Professor London, Miriam London and Ken Ling, whom they address as „yuan zuo-zhe“ (source material writer). “Yuan zhu" and "yuan zuo-zhe“ can be translated as “writer of source material“. The translation of the original American preface is also included. Miriam London and Ta-Ling Lee are rather inconspicuously registered in the attributions after Ken Ling as the "source material writer" and followed by the names of the two interpreters as having arranged the English text. The copyright was acquired by the Hong Kong publisher.

In the German edition there is no ambiguity. The inclusion of Ken Ling as the Red Guard's pseudonym on the front cover is clearly represented as an integral part of the subtitle. A brief introduction on the first page concludes by praising the report as being ″living and thrilling contemporary history within an autobiographical frame, a wealthy historical source and the psychogram of a typical young Chinese of the time.″ The melding of personal experience and research report is clearly elaborated. The publisher notes the following separately above the attributions:

Der englische Originaltext wurde erstellt von Miriam London und Li Ta-ling auf der Grundlage von Aufzeichnungen Ken Lings und Interviews, die eine Forschergruppe unter Ivan D. London mit ihm durchführte.(The English original text was prepared by Miriam London and Li Ta-ling on the basis of written statements of Ken Ling and interviews with him conducted by a research team led by Ivan D. London.) The authorship of the publication is attributed to Ken Ling, Miriam London and Li Ta-ling (Ta-Ling Lee). The copyright was acquired by the publisher.

According to the front cover of the French edition the author of the publication appears to be only Ken Ling. Printed in large capital letters, Ken Ling appears in the upper part of the cover followed by the main title printed in bold face small print and the subtitle underneath in normal print. Miriam London and Ta-Ling Lee appear in the attributions as publishers of the ″American version″ and scientific editors. The copyright is held by the publisher.

The Thai edition includes an incomplete note stating at the bottom of the front cover that the copyright of the 1972 English edition is held by "Dr. Ivan London and Miriam".

The 2016 edition of the Chinese translation of "The Revenge of Heaven", under a new title with completely modified attributions and prefaces, was issued on the fifty year anniversary of the initiation of Mao's "Cultural Revolution" and enjoyed its third reprint during early 2020. The text is character by character identical to the original 1972 Chinese translation of the novel-based American research report . The modified attributions and new prefaces provide no indication that anyone else had been involved in the publication other than a Chinese "editor" and a Chinese "proofreader". Disturbingly, there is no mention of Miriam London, Ta-Ling Lee, or translators Ms. Ting Kuang-sheng and Liu K'un-sheng. Ken Ling appears as the sole author. The pseudonym originally invented to protect Guo Kunren's family members in the PRC has now to be understood as the name of a Chinese novelist. The name Ivan D. London (first name misspelled as "Evan") is mentioned only once, as a certain American professor who encouraged the author to write down his experiences as a Red Guard in Mao's "Cultural Revolution".

== The Development of the Book ==
=== The Developers ===
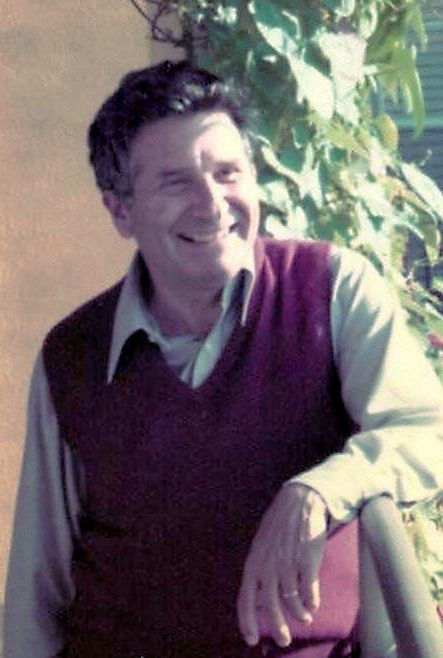
Ivan D. London

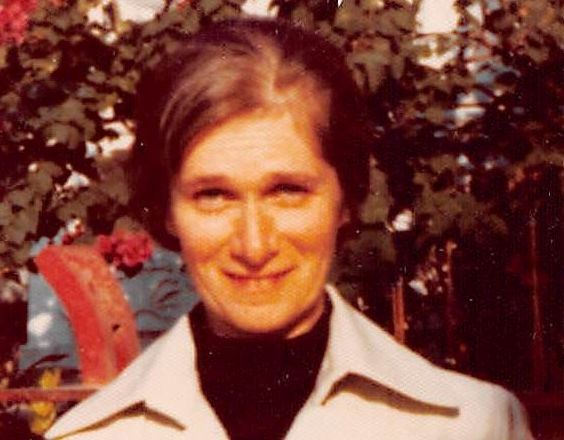
Miriam London

Ivan D. London (1913–1983) and Miriam London (1923–2011) first established themselves in American academe as specialists in Soviet studies with in-depth insights gained from refugee interviews. Both were born in the U.S. to immigrant parents from Ukraine, which was then part of Russia and later the Soviet Union, and were exposed to a multilingual environment. Ivan D. London earned his A. B. degree in mathematics in 1935, turning to psychology after army service, and earned his PhD degree in psychology from Tulane University, New Orleans (USA), in 1950. Miriam London, then Miriam Boulotchnik, obtained her A. B. degree in chemistry in 1943 and her A. M. degree one year later from Radcliffe Graduate School, Harvard Department of Slavic Studies. After their marrying in 1947, she completed coursework toward a PhD degree at the University of Chicago in 1948 through 1950. Ivan D. London subsequently received an appointment to the ″Harvard Refugee Interview Project on the Social System of the Soviet Union″ (Harvard Émigré Interview Project) at Harvard's Russian Research Center in 1950. Miriam London did not complete her dissertation and instead accompanied her husband to the Harvard Research Center where she was later also employed. In the beginning of 1952, Ivan D. London accepted a teaching position at Brooklyn College, City University of New York. From that time forward, they conducted independent research as a team, building up the "Research Institute for Political Psychology"; focusing upon the Soviet Union.

With the beginning of the De-Stalinisation of the Soviet Union in 1956, the Iron Curtain became gradually permeable and refugee interviews lost more and more of their general significance as far as the so-called Socialist Camp in Eastern Europe was concerned. At the same time, as the so-called Bamboo Curtain in East Asia became increasingly dense, the Londons turned their attention towards the PRC. They designed a research project aimed at the exploration of the Chinese social system, leveraging information collected from a large number of refugees with maximally diverse backgrounds. Partially supported by several private foundations, including the Smith Richardson Foundation, they were able to support their research over a period of 12 years, from 1963 through 1975, in which they took yearly field trips of two to three months duration to Hong Kong and Taiwan. In support of that project, Miriam London studied the Chinese vernacular, attaining a fundamental level of fluency, adding to her fluency in French and Russian beyond her native English.

=== The method ===
In their interviews, the Londons used an innovative research method that Ivan D. London termed as the ″psychological″ or, more specifically, the ″idiographic″ method. Its characteristics can be summarized by the following three principles:

1. No preconceived goals and no standardized questionnaire;
2. Thorough preparation for the interview sessions while being open-minded to changes that the course of the interview might take due to the respondent’s statements;
3. Strict confinement of the interviewer to the personal experiences of the respondent.

Ivan D. London viewed that the determinism inherent in the conventional interviewing strategy, i.e., sequentially going through a questionnaire designed to generate information on a particular issue, directly or indirectly influences the outcome to produce ″convergent″ results. I. e., the interviewee responses are confined to the constraints imposed by the questionnaire, and could be influenced by their interpretation of what the interviewer's goals are. Thus, a fixed questionnaire could unintentionally function as a self-fulfilment of preconceived notions that may have been implicit in the interview strategy.

Gaining insights into a communist political system, which is inherently opaque to information sharing, required a non-conventional approach to refugee interviewing. Interview sessions were carefully prepared to create an atmosphere that fostered peer level communications between the interviewer and respondent. Instead of simply leading the respondent through the session via a prepared sequence of questions, the interviewer would be prepared to alter his enquiries based upon the respondent's testimony. The results could end up being unanticipated, or in other words, what London in his methodological treatises had typified as ″divergent amplification″.

The final component of London's research method concerned the relevance and reliability of information generated from refugee interviews. To secure both of these aspects the interviewer had to meticulously study the respondent's persona, gain familiarity with all details of his daily life, including likes and dislikes. to understand what this particular individual had personally experienced, seen and accomplished. Only through this very personal record, counterchecked by a multitude of other records of that nature, could the interviewer gain visibility into a social reality that lay beyond his reach. The individual perceptions would thus coalesce to represent the reality of a given society as a whole.

=== Three developmental stages ===
The Revenge of Heaven evolved within the context of the much broader scale, in terms of time frame and substance, research on the PRC being engaged in by Ivan D. London and his wife Miriam London. The Londons had not anticipated publishing a special research account of their summer 1969 to early autumn 1970 interviews of the former Red Guard (aka Ken Ling) and neither did their respondent envisage planning a novel about his experiences as Mao's ″little General″. He still had to finish middle school.

In an initial exchange of letters during the fall of 1968, Ivan D. London asked the young man recommended to him ″to record his understanding of more than 100 terms of political jargon current during the Cultural Revolution″ to make sure that he was dealing with a genuine former Red Guard. ″The response was″, as London later expressed himself ″prompt and ample, fresh and revealingly detailed. There was no doubt – here was an unusual respondent waiting to be interviewed″.

In the summer of 1969 – in hindsight the beginning of the first developmental stage in the making of The Revenge of Heaven – the Londons went to Taiwan on their annual field trip and conducted systematic interviews of the young man and, initially also his elder brother. The interviewing team consisted of Ivan D. London as the project developer, Miriam London taking notes and consulting, and Karl Kungseng Liu as interpreter.

″[...] questions proceeded″, London noted, ″on the assumption that psychological divination and understanding of the person in culturally strange and politically obscure situations are best managed through a minute, detailed dissection of sampled daily living and of the special events in that person's life. Thus, the single detail or nuance may be, and often is, as revealing and important as any detectable pattern or structure discerned. A triple advantage inheres also in this approach: invariably knowledge of the situation is built up along with knowledge of the person and vice versa, while interconnections between the two are established″.

When the Londons went back to New York in the autumn of 1969 the respondent was given the task of elaborating on ten specific episodes they had encountered in the interviews. ″Any system of questioning″, Professor London explained, ″must weave, however subtly, some kind of procrusteanizing straitjacket for the respondent. To transcend this effect, the respondent must be given an opportunity to break out of the straitjacket and to do so while adding significantly to the fund of information being accumulated. One way is recourse to free writing – a technique serving functions which are narrative in form, but psychologically projective″.

A second developmental stage evolved from the Londons′ consideration that the extraordinary insights they had acquired regarding the cultural revolutionary developments in mainland China deserved to be shared with the American public. Given that former endeavours to publicize their findings about the Soviet Union had not been satisfying, Professor London came to the conclusion ″...that the literary way of reconstituting and projecting reality could be applied to the findings and insights of research, without abandoning the literalness of a research report.″

In fact, he may very well have been inspired by his wife, who not only had cared for the ″adequacy and fineness of what was being recorded″ and participated ″in the formulation of questions to further these attributes″, but was also the one to put ″The journal of a former Red Guard″ ultimately into its literary form. As Ivan D. London confirmed in a later passage of his ″brief methodological account″ on The Revenge of Heaven, it was ″Mrs. London who bore the responsibility for the realization of the book as she was the one member of the research team who possessed the requisite literary sense and skill for the job″.

Having decided upon a literary approach the Londons invited Ta-Ling Lee (born 1933), professor of history at Southern Connecticut State College (USA), and their long-term close collaborator to join the book development project. Professor Ta-Ling Lee would help with translating the written materials delivered by the young man who was now about to become Ken Ling, and subject them ″to independent critical scrutiny″.

At this stage, Miriam London prepared a story about the formation of the Red Guards in Ken Ling's middle school and their treatment of their teachers there, which was published in the New York Times Magazine of January 4, 1970. It was extremely effective and the Londons were encouraged to proceed in developing a book ″which would report ideographically on the Cultural Revolution, with a Ken Ling speaking in the first person as reconstitutor of the reality″.

In the spring of 1970 Miriam London outlined a preliminary book draft and approached the future publisher to discuss the significance of the publication proposal as well as technical details including the publisher's March 1971 deadline.

With that agreement in mind, the Londons went to Taiwan in the summer of 1970, beginning the most time and energy consuming third stage of the book development. All the interview materials accumulated to date had to be re-checked and any remaining information gaps had to be closed. At the same time new questions arose, data concerning the broader political context had to be verified and aspects initially not seen as central had to be scrutinized, clarified and integrated into the overall picture that was developing before the researchers' eyes. It was at this point, for example, that the Londons became aware of the romantic relationship between Ken Ling and one of his girl school-mates who was part of the group he led on the link-up trip to the North and who perished during street fightings in Amoy. It was this side-line story that led to the title eventually selected for the book. This title made it clear that this publication was not a generic history of the Cultural Revolution, but rather the story of how a young man of sixteen/seventeen years experienced the Cultural Revolution as one of his locally prominent actors.

Given the pressing manuscript delivery deadline, and the ever increasing importance of Ken Ling's written input, the Londons invited their respondent to move into their hotel to facilitate communications. They invited Professor Wu Ping-chung (1920 ? – 2003), one of China's most outstanding linguists at the time, to join the project. Wu Ping-chung recorded literal oral translations of the provided written material and added his own comments on the language and content. The material was then, as was usual in pre-digital times, sent via airmail to Professor Ta-Ling Lee in New Haven, Connecticut (USA) who provided ″a carefully executed translation which would reflect accurately both the language and idiosyncratic tenor of the original Chinese″.

In total, the research material amounted to about 300 interview hours, 400,000 Chinese characters of written input from Ken Ling and an additional 100,000 characters of responses to specific requests. Despite this enormous amount of material, Miriam London nevertheless managed to process it and complete The Revenge of Heaven in seven months to meet the publisher's deadline.

== Relevance: Three Perspectives ==
=== The initial Perspective ===
The publication of The Revenge of Heaven coincided with a radical change of policies of the PRC and the USA towards each other. From February 21 through 28 1972, the then American President, Richard M. Nixon, visited the PRC (Peking, Hangzhou and Shanghai) by invitation of the PRC government. With that visit, for the first time since the establishment of Communist rule on October 1, 1949, China had become accessible to a larger group of American citizens –specifically, the diplomats, scholars and journalists who accompanied the President. Nixon's trip to China marked a fundamental shift the PRC’ s foreign policy, reflected in China's almost total absence from the international diplomatic scene for several years. The Peking leadership had managed to antagonize not just both of the superpowers, the US and the USSR, and their respective allies, but also numerous countries of then so-called Third World to which World Revolution in the form of Maoism was to be exported soon as possible.

Moreover, the PRC leadership had with very few exceptions barely tolerated foreign visitors. These were limited to certain specialists who had pledged to abstain from reporting of anything they observed while staying in the country, and so-called ″friends of China″, who were essentially courtiers.

Accordingly, there had been virtually no direct knowledge about contemporary China in the Western world. The country was considered terra incognita. Amazingly, information provided by the CCP and China's foreign friends was considered trustworthy. Whatever reservations they held about Communism in China, most Western observers firmly believed, that at least Mao Tse-tung had eradicated hunger and starving beggars in the country once and for all.

The most influential Western courtiers of the PRC were two self-described ″world travellers, lecturers and pundits″, who were well acquainted with one another: specifically, Klaus Mehnert (1906–1984), a German journalist and professor of political science at the Rheinisch Westfälische Technische Universität Aachen (Germany), and the American scholar John King Fairbank (1907–1991), professor of sinology at the East Asian Research Center at Harvard University.

In his book China nach dem Sturm (American edition: China returns; English edition: China today) which he published immediately after his return from a 32-day journey to the PRC made possible with the help of his friend Prince Sihanouk of Cambodia, in 1971, Klaus Mehnert told the Western World:

″In China, the Cultural Revolution broke up the kind of social encrustation that had begun since the triumph of the revolution, and the effect has been, that both government and society have acquired a high degree of spontaneity. On the one hand there is Mao, the charismatic leader, and on the other are the ′masses′. Everything in between is in the midst of flux.″

And Mehnert assured his readers:

″The little Red Book and the [Mao’s] Selected Works will have canonical authority for a long time, perhaps for a very long time [...] it may be said of some of Mao's ideas that they have entered the Chinese bloodstream.″

Finally Mehnert concluded:

″All things considered, I think I can say with perfect candour, that the joy the Chinese appear to derive from their work and their life; the élan generated by their achievements ′by one’s own strength′, which I saw everywhere I went, were not a matter of simply following orders or of a show put on for the foreign visitor. It is the pleasure of the ordinary man at his everyday occupation, carrying out his simple tasks, and in the amazing discovery that he can do it without officials, chief engineers, head bookkeepers, and managing directors.″

From late May through early July 1972, John King Fairbank spent six weeks in the PRC ″on the reiterated oral invitation of Premier Zhou Enlai″ visiting large parts of the countryside in the North and Northwest which he knew personally from the early 1930s. In his eyewitness report published in Foreign Affairs in October 1972, Fairbank departed from what he used to know about life in the Chinese countryside and stated:

″Today the dogs and flies are gone, rows of poplars and electric lines march across the flat North China landscape, electric pumps supply new irrigation ditches, and crops in the big fields are diversified and interplanted. The people seem healthy, well fed, and articulate about their role as citizens of chairman Mao’s new China. Compared with 40 years ago the change in the countryside is miraculous, a revolution probably on the largest scale of all time.″

Fairbank summarized his observations in three points:

″My strongest first impression in June 1972″, he wrote, ″in contrast with the deterioration of the 1930s and 1940s is one of unity and homogeneity″. ″A second impression is that China is still and will long remain an agrarian country. The people are almost too numerous to live in cities. [...] The agrarian bent of chairman Mao, who disesteems city ways, is no accident but follows directly from his concern for the common people, who live by farming the land [...] Third the People's Republic under Mao, building on this homogeneous farming population, is now fully engaged in its own style of industrial revolution. While there are many big plants, the effort is to avoid the centralization of industrial growth. [...] Instead the stress is partly on local, small-scale production integrated with the collectivized farming communities. The Great Leap of 1958, for all its excessive and aborted hopes, catapulted farmers into small industries.″

Nixon's fellow travellers to the PRC by and large gathered the same impressions. Against this glowing backdrop, the narrations of the Chinese high school student Ken Ling resurfaced the classical picture of China during the first half of the 20th century – the land of famine and beggars, breathtaking stench and appalling dirt, prostitution and robbery, and last but not least corruption and embezzlement. On his trips to the North and Northeast, Ken Ling came across beggars clothed in meager rags who gathered in masses in the railway stations and reached their emaciated arms out for food from the passengers whenever trains came into the station. In the streets, beggars would snatch a bite of food from people's hands if they did not watch out. From the train window, Ken Ling saw trees stripped off their bark, occasional corpses lying by the tracks, and once even a child's leg.

Bad odors, dirt, ruthless behaviour and starvation seemed to him as phenomena of the North and particularly of the province of Anhui. However, these were not isolated instances. When Ken Ling visited the countryside high up in Western Fujian, he found a whole village living only on the dregs of squashed sweet potatoes, as their juice was required to be sold to the government, and non-nutritious and tasteless (due to lack of salt) bamboo shoots boiled in water. The peasants had not learnt to read and to write, their language was poor and their bodies were worn out even before they reached adulthood. All these were sideline observations provided by Ken Ling as he reconstituted his revolutionary activities.

At a crucial juncture in Sino-American relations The Revenge of Heaven, provided a trenchant counterpoint to the initially rosy perceptions of the PRC in the West.

=== The intermediate Perspective ===
Within the decade of the 1970s the Londons were able to confirm the veracity of their findings, even just on the basis of official reports and documents from the PRC that became available during that time frame. They decided that, in the interest of historical accuracy, it was important to publicly challenge the positions of those experts who championed a distorted projection of the reality of Mao's China, and, in some respects had altered it beyond recognition.

From 1960 through 1962 alone, the people in mainland China had suffered a famine that might easily be considered the worst in human history. While it did not remain unnoticed in the West, it was mostly attributed to extreme weather conditions and downplayed as being due to some temporary food shortages. In fact, the ″three bitter years″ as the famine was called by the people in the PRC resulted directly from Mao's ambitious policy of the so-called ″Three Red Banners″. As early as August 1962, László Ladány (1914–1990), editor of the Bulletin China News Analysis in Hong Kong, calculated that about 50 million people perished from starvation and diseases in connection with undernourishment – a figure presently not rejected by the CCP. He based this estimate on several sources ranging from PRC radio broadcasts, refugee interviews and letters from the mainland, to the numbers of food parcels sent from the British colony to places in China. Jürgen Domes (1932–2001), who as a young political scientist had introduced Contemporary China Studies in Germany at the Otto–Suhr–Institute of the Free University of Berlin (Germany), was the first person in Western Europe in 1971 to cautiously suggest that about 10 million people perished in that famine. ″But″, he had added, ″an estimate of even several times this number cannot be entirely dismissed″. For this statement, and many other conclusions of his analyses of politics in China, Domes was strongly criticised and in sinological circles he was even demonised.

The Londons referred to him and quite obviously also to themselves as the research team behind The Revenge of Heaven, when they asked ″the powerful sinological establishment at Harvard and its academic outposts″ whether ″accurate knowledge of the flesh-and-blood realities of China under Mao emerged from their generously financed research, or rather from the works of a few outsiders and foreigners, often operating on a shoestring″. And they pointed out the fact that ″money and prestige add up to power as readily in academe as anywhere else″. ″The academic power centers, thus created″, they continued, ″not only tend to nurture such ills as ′consensus scholarship′, whereby ′top scholars′ agree to agree about certain data and methods, in this way establishing an unassailable ′authoritative position′; these centers can also function to bury or discredit the alternative viewpoints so necessary to the pursuit of knowledge."

It took another decade and further reviews of sinological books on contemporary China until the ″authoritative position″ of the old venerable discipline of sinology in the field of studies on Modern China finally lay in shambles. The novel-like research report of the Londons had a considerable share in the denouement of that position.

=== The long range Perspective ===
In 1974, Arnulf Baring (1932–2019), professor of political science at the Free University of Berlin, frequent political commentator in German news media and self-declared admirer of the research work of the Londons, suggested in a review of the German edition of The Revenge of Heaven in the weekly newspaper Die Zeit that Ken Ling might become a Chinese Grimmelshausen in contemporary world literature; however, he would surely figure as a Maoist Wolfgang Leonhard (1921–2014) in our history books. This prediction seems to be outdated, for as early as in the late 1970s there emerged a whole new genre of literature in China, the so-called Scar literature of reports of personal experiences directly written by former participants and / or victims of the "Cultural Revolution". Their stories are breathtaking like the narrations processed by the research team of the Londons, as well as heartbreaking, but they were often still devoted to what was then temporarily the post – Cultural Revolutionary CCP party line. Other individual reports of Chinese contemporary witnesses of the Cultural Revolution followed in the 1980s, now in the spirit of the new policy of China's opening toward the outside world and economic reforms. As a personal life account, therefore, The Revenge of Heaven no longer appears extraordinary in the current day and age.

The lasting significance of The Revenge of Heaven ultimately rests in the scholarly development of that book and underlying methodological approach. Ivan D. London and Miriam London were newcomers to the Chinese scene and strangers to the field of Chinese studies. Both were specialists in Soviet studies and had worked within the context of the psychological discipline. While they relied on an interpreter, Miriam London first learned the standard Chinese language to understand the interview interactions held in Chinese and to check sources, and Ivan D. London engaged two other highly qualified Chinese scholars to assure data integrity. These were the outstanding Chinese linguist Wu Ping-chung in Taiwan and the Chinese American historian Ta-Ling Lee in the USA. There is no doubt, that they approached their subject with all due respect for Chinese culture and with all necessary precautions regarding the political circumstances under which they had to work. But they were certain that social-scientific methods were as applicable to research on present day China as to any other country in the world despite the peculiarities of the historical culture of China, the political culture of the CCP, the Chinese life style, and the Chinese way of thinking. They were proved correct. The novel-like research report The Revenge of Heaven, therefore, includes a general lesson of timeless validity: no political system can camouflage the social and economic conditions of a given country when Social Science principles are rigorously employed. It only takes intellectual honesty and an appropriate method to get through the barriers intended to hide reality.

== Reviews ==
In the general public of the US and the United Kingdom, The Revenge of Heaven received considerable attention and mostly appreciation for the realism conveyed in the overall picture drawn by Ken Ling and presented by Miriam London and Ta-Ling Lee. About 90 reviews were published in various print media and radio broadcasts, including The Wall Street Journal, The New Yorker, The Los Angeles Times, The National Observer, CBS Radio, The Economist (Great Britain) and The China Quarterly to name only a few. Newsweek’s reviewer S. K. Oberbeck, for example, called the book ″extraordinary and important [...] a detailed firsthand account of the bloody convulsions that shook China during the cultural revolution, an inside, intimate look at the Red Guard movement by one of Mao's ′little generals′ [...] this is the book to read for a wider, more credible picture of the enigma of China under the red star.″

However, reactions from the academic circles in the USA were divided and ranged from hostile and/or reserved to converted from disbelief to persuaded.

An example of the former reaction appears in the review from James E. Sheridan (1922–2015), professor of history at Northwestern University, highly respected for his books on modern China but in the terms of the Londons an ″academic outpost″ of Harvard Sinology. Professor Sheridan raised a point certainly worth considering, namely that the book publication lacked a full introduction into the making of the story. Ivan D. London acknowledged the identified lack, and followed up with a focused methodological account, published in 1974 in Psychological Reports and later included in the German edition of the book.

In his review, which appeared in three different American newspapers, Sheridan, however, exploited this shortcoming to denounce the whole book. In his view, there was something ″fishy″ about it – not exactly a term of scientific precision. At the same time Sheridan complained, that the preface, which he called ″enigmatic″ only ″implies, but does not say that 300 hours of interviews had been conducted with Ken Ling″. ″Can a book that was developed by a team of American and Chinese scholars honestly be titled a ′journal of a young Chinese′?″ asked Sheridan. He then raised what he possibly viewed as the ″killer″ question: ″Why [...] does the book not inform us [...] that Ken Ling was interviewed on Taiwan, a fact that may have influenced his comments?″

Sheridan desired to completely discredit The Revenge of Heaven. ″The Chinese youngsters in these pages″, he wrote, ″appear opportunistic, selfish, dishonest, brutal. This may be, and it would certainly be important for us to know if it is. However, the author himself emerges as such an unprincipled and vicious opportunist that the reader hesitates to believe him about anything, including the character and behaviour of other Red Guards″.

Ken Ling, indeed, showed himself as an unprincipled and vicious opportunist. From what he conveyed about his own behavior as a Red Guard, one may very well suspect him as having been one of those who tortured and killed their teachers in the Eighth Amoy Middle School. He flatly denies this. However, whether or not Ken Ling himself committed the utterly atavistic cruelties he attributes to his classmates is irrelevant in the context of the book's authenticity. As Professor Sheridan points out himself "it would be important for us to know" the reality of Mao's China. The London's published their book to share the results of their research with "us". During the early 1960s, the Chinese society experienced the worst famine in human history. Against this backdrop, did the book reviewer seriously believe that behavioural attitudes like strength of character, altruism, honesty, charity and civility were predominant social features in Communist China when Mao's "Cultural Revolution" unfolded in the summer of 1966?

Professor Sheridan attempted to discount the book in one way or the other, by, on the one hand, implying it pretended to be the journal of a young Chinese but in reality had been developed by a team of American and Chinese scholars, and on the other hand questioning the credibility of the young Chinese respondent due to the unsavoury character revealed by his input.

An entirely different reaction towards The Revenge of Heaven came from Richard Baum (1940–2012), another reputed specialist in contemporary China studies, professor at the University of California, Los Angeles (USA). In his memoirs that were published only in 2010, Baum reports:

″My own ambivalence, including my suspension of disbelief ended rather abruptly in mid-1972, when I came across a detailed firsthand account of Cultural Revolution upheaval in Fujian.″

Baum’s knowledge of the reality of China differed considerably from what he read in the book.

″To satisfy my lingering doubts″, he continued, ″I wrote a long letter to Ivan and Miriam London. Detailing the nature and sources of my scepticism and asking if they (or Ken Ling) could provide documentation or other collateral evidence to verify the many sensational claims made in Ling’s book. To my surprise they responded with an even longer letter – twelve pages, typed, single space – containing a point-by-point response to each of my questions, along with an impressive list of bibliographic references (mostly Chinese sources) documenting in considerable detail many of Ken Lings assertions. It was a serious thoughtful response, and it ended with the Londons assuring me that notwithstanding a certain amount of authorial hubris, Ken Ling was for real, the genuine article. I found myself persuaded both by the quality of the Londons’ evidence and by the measured tone of their response.″
