= Xiao Bawang (disambiguation) =

Xiao Bawang (Chinese: 小霸王; lit. 'Little Emperor or Little Tyrant') may be:

- Subor, Chinese video game console brand manufactured by Xiǎo Bàwáng Company
- Little Bawang, a character in Born Red

== See also ==
- Little emperor syndrome
