= Ivan D. London and Miriam London =

American scholars

Ivan D. London
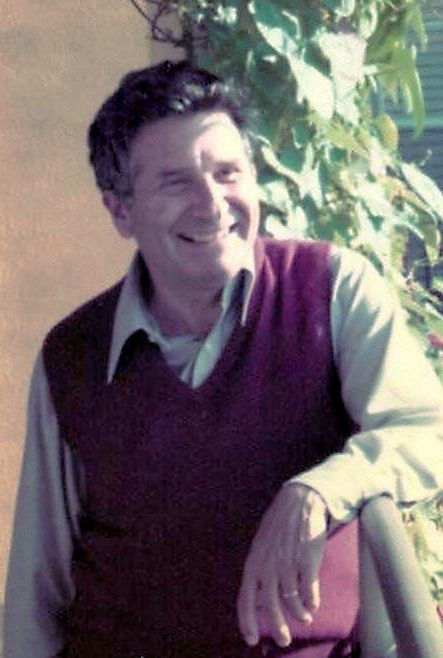
- Born: Ivan Daniel London; January 8, 1913; Philadelphia, US
- Died: April 14, 1983 (aged 70); New York City, US
- Education: Temple University; Northwestern University; Tulane University
- Spouse: Miriam Boulotchnik
- Children: Eve Varma

Miriam London
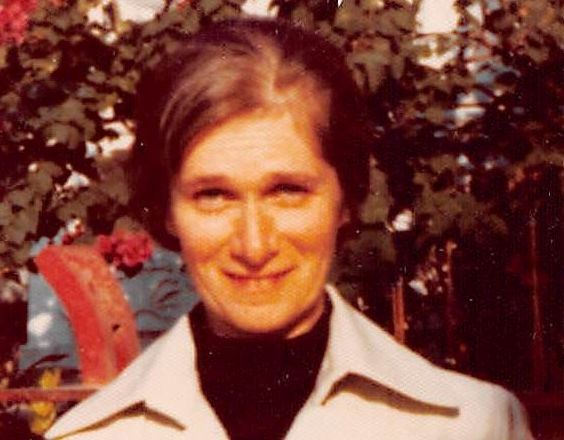
- Born: Miriam Boulotchnik; June 23, 1923; Philadelphia, US
- Died: July 23, 2011 (aged 88); New York City, US
- Education: University of Pennsylvania; Harvard Department of Slavic Studies; University of Chicago
- Spouse: Ivan Daniel London
- Children: Eve Varma

Ivan Daniel London (1913–1983) and Miriam B. London (1923–2011) were American scholars who were known for their research on the social systems of the Soviet Union and the People's Republic of China (PRC) on the basis of refugee interviews. Both were born in the United States to immigrant parents from Ukraine, which was then part of Russia and later the Soviet Union, and were exposed to a multi-lingual environment. Both started their academic studies within the natural sciences. This early training in scientific disciplines appears to have had a major impact on the methodological treatises Ivan D. London contributed to the field of Social Science and on the methods he and his wife Miriam London applied in their interviewing approach and subsequent processing of amassed information. During the better part of the Cold War era their publications, particularly, in the field of Contemporary China Studies were considered highly controversial by the prevalent sinological academic circles. Today, it can hardly be denied that their research was ground breaking.

== Ivan D. London ==
Ivan D. London was born Jan. 8, 1913 in Philadelphia, Pennsylvania (US), where he studied mathematics at Temple University and earned his A. B. degree in 1935. After military service, however, London turned to psychology. In 1945 he earned his A. M. degree in that discipline at Northwestern University in Illinois (US) and in 1950 he earned his doctoral degree at Tulane University in New Orleans (US). His Ph.D. thesis dealt with "The convergent and divergent in Systematic Psychology". Early publications indicate that Ivan D. London's academic interest entirely focussed upon the state of affairs of psychology in the Soviet Union, particularly the conditions and procedures utilized within Soviet psychiatric hospitals:

- A historical survey of psychology in the Soviet Union,
- Contemporary Psychology in the Soviet Union,
- Soviet psychology and psychiatry,
- Therapy in Soviet psychiatric hospitals.

In 1950 he joined the Russian Research Center at Harvard University where he worked as a research associate within the "Harvard Refugee Interview Project on the Social System of the Soviet Union" (Harvard Emigre Interview Project).

In early 1952, however, Ivan D. London accepted the position of an associate professor at Brooklyn College at the City University of New York, where he was to teach social psychology, later as a full professor, until his death on April 12, 1983, in New York City. In 1960 Ivan D. London also obtained the certificate of psychologist in the State of New York.

At Brooklyn College Ivan D. and Miriam London established a research group which later became the "Research Institute for Political Psychology". Via this institute, scholars from other universities were invited to collaborate on projects they were conducting, specifically Oleg Anisimov, Herbert H. Paper (1925–2012), Gordon E. Peterson, Nikolai P. Poltoratzky (1921–1990), Ivan Elagin (1918–1987), Vladimir Samarin (1913–1992), Avery D. Weisman (1913–2017) and others. In 1953 Ivan D. London was entrusted with the Inwood Project on Intercultural Communication, the scope and methods of which are reflected by the following six publications:

- The young East German and Soviet defector: A report on similarities,
- A note on Soviet science,
- Nonthematic, nontechnical factors influencing the effectiveness of plausible appeals directed to a Soviet audience,
- The Soviet propaganda image of the West,
- Differential reactions of recent and earlier defectors to anti-Soviet propaganda themes and
- Soviet reaction to the down-grading of Stalin and some suggestions for American broadcasts to the Soviet Union.

In the course of the three and a half years duration of that project a sample of 425 Soviet emigres was "constituted in West Germany, Chile and America with a scattering in other countries" and interviewed "to replace the impressionistic reports of foreigners ... and propagandistic output of Soviet authorities by systematic research". The emigres consisted of (1) refugees who voluntarily left the Soviet Union during the last war, (2) former forced laborers, so-called Ostarbeiter, and prisoners-of-war, (3) defectors who fled the Soviet Armed Forces or the Occupational Administration during and subsequent to world war II, and (4) non-returners, who having been sent abroad on commission decided not to return home. About 40% of the sample were postwar emigres, the remainder were wartime emigres. Significantly, the findings of the Inwood Project research "diverged markedly in several respects" from those of the Harvard Project on the Soviet Social System.

As De-Stalinisation progressed during the second half of the 1950s, Ivan D. London was able to establish a broad range of contacts among Soviet psychologists, and became a leading expert in Soviet psychology in the U. S.

In 1963 the Londons turned their attention to the People's Republic of China (PRC) a country hidden behind the so-called Bamboo Curtain in East Asia the more the so-called Iron Curtain in Europe was becoming permeable.

Partially supported by private foundations, including the Smith Richardson Foundation, they were able to support their research on China over a period of twelve years, from 1963 through 1975, in which they took yearly field trips of two to three-month duration to Hong Kong and Taiwan.

== Methodological considerations and method of research ==
=== Calling for a paradigm shift in the Social Sciences ===
During the first half of the 20th century, many academic psychologists endorsed the idea that their discipline should become more scientific by emulating concepts and methods of traditional physics. During the same time, many traditional physicists were also struggling to reconcile their basic concepts of classical mechanics with the discovery of the principles of quantum mechanics. Ivan D. London was the first psychologist to argue that psychology would benefit by pursuing an equivalent consideration.

During his studies in mathematics London had been fascinated by the treatises of the German physicist Werner Heisenberg (1901–1976) on quantum mechanics, which he was able to read in the original. Observing, however, it had become the fashion by those who emphasized the necessity and positive value of statistical formulations in psychology to invoke Heisenberg's principle of indeterminacy, London in his treatise

- Psychology and Heisenberg's Principle of Indeterminacy

demonstrated that this principle, "as formulated for quantum theory by Heisenberg, is grossly inapplicable for psychology and that, in consequence, no matter what may be the arguments presented in defense of the statistical approach to psychological problems, Heisenberg's principle of indeterminacy may not be one of them."

In the same vein, London in his treatise

- Psychologists' Misuse of the Auxiliary Concepts of Physics and Mathematics

also rejected Kurt Lewin's (1890–1947), so-called "topological psychology". "The claim of 'topological' psychology to deductive rigor", London concluded, "is mathematically spurious and results from an unfortunate misapplication of a very generalized branch of mathematics totally unrelated to the needs of psychological theory."

An inspiration, which assumed fundamental importance for London's methodological life's work, came from Irving Langmuir (1881–1957). In his famous speech as president of the American Association for the Advancement of Science in 1943, Langmuir had argued that the traditional/quantum distinction in physics had its analogy in many domains of nature beyond physics, including all domains containing convergent and divergent phenomena. He noted:

Just as there are two types of physics, classical physics and quantum physics, which have for nearly twenty-five years seemed irreconcilable, just so we must recognize two types of natural phenomena. First, those in which the behaviour of system can be determined by the average behaviour of its component parts; and secondly, those in which a single discontinuous event (which may depend upon a single quantum charge) becomes magnified in its effect so that the behaviour of the whole aggregate does depend upon something that started from a small beginning. The first class of phenomena I want to call 'convergent phenomena', because all the fluctuating details of the individual atoms average out, giving a result that coverages on a definite state. The second class we may call 'divergent phenomena', where from a small beginning increasingly large effects are produced. In general, then, we may say that classical physics applies satisfactorily to convergent phenomena and that they conform well to the older ideas of cause and effect. The divergent phenomena, on the other hand, can best be understood on the basis of the quantum theory of modern physics.

Langmuir's convergent/divergent distinction clarified the difference between theories and methods of classical and quantum physics, arguing that each was appropriate for its own domain. Ivan D. London posed a logical question: If physics could benefit from at least two approaches to studying physical phenomena, could psychology benefit from at least two approaches to studying psychological phenomena?

In his doctoral thesis, pursuing this question, London proposed that psychological phenomena, like their physical cousins, also showed properties of convergence and divergence, which he called ″convergent amplification″ and ″divergent amplification″. The former can be seen in small behavioural variations that "average out" (converge to an average) over time; examples include reaction times, judgments of distance, athletic performances, and IQ test scores. The latter can be seen in small behavioural variations that amplify their consequences or effects (diverge from an average), including irreversible decisions, disfiguring accidents, random encounters with influential people, technological innovations, and historical events such as Brexit or COVID-19.

The treatise

- Some consequences for history and psychology of Langmuir's concept of convergence and divergence of phenomena,

can be considered London's basic methodological credo. London suggested that divergently-amplified psychological phenomena have at least two distinguishing properties: multiple and contingent causation. Friendship, for example, can arise from multiple causes such as mutual interests, physical proximity, ethnic background, shared experience, etc. Nonetheless, these causes can influence, and often can change the strength or direction of other relationships. Thus, hypothetically, physical proximity might increase the probability of friendship, but not if a significant age gap impeded shared understandings or lack of a common language/dialect precluded meaningful communication.

Dealing with

- Free will as a function of divergence and
- The Developing personality as a joint function of convergence and divergence,

London argued that complex links of multiple and contingent causation that characterise divergent psychological phenomena cannot be fully understood using simple "A causes B" concepts such as those employed in classical physics. Instead, alternative kinds of explanations should be considered to illuminate the networks of influence ("context effects") in someone's psychological development or life history. We should expect that these influences will likely vary across people, situations and time, so traditional, "on average" summaries might be misleading or invalid. We are more likely to discover recurring patterns within causal networks by aggregating analyses of individual cases than by analyzing aggregations of individual cases. And we are more likely to understand diversity in these patterns by seeing them from diverse perspectives than by eliminating all but the best-fitting one.

For the very practical purpose of his research, London's methodological considerations grew beyond the psychological discipline. Interviews with refugees had to be conducted because there was no direct access to information from the Soviet Union. To aggregate representative samples was impossible. The researcher had to rely on individual testimonies to retrieve a picture of the social whole. Again, Ivan D. London was the first in the field of studies on communist ruled countries to suggest that the Social Sciences could derive overall benefit from employing at least two approaches. Referring to Wilhelm Windelband's (1848–1915) distinction between the Natural Sciences (Naturwissenschaften) and the Humanities (Geisteswissenschaften) he termed the first conventional approach derived from traditional physics "nomothetic [...] with its antithetic emphasis on numbers and on the many". The second approach, which derived from quantum theoretical considerations, London termed "idiographic [...] with the 'uniqueness of the individual' casting light on the many".

In his 1977 treatise on

- Convergent and Divergent Amplification and its meaning for Social Science

London directly called for a paradigm shift in the social sciences. He argued that social science required "a paradigm fundamentally different from that currently in use which reflects essentially the habits of classical physics." Its basic characteristic were "the prevalence of minor and major events which amplify sequentially in such a way as to converge toward or diverge from expected outcomes." Other characteristics of social science as "the historicity of its subject matter, the everpresent tension between stability and change, the frequent primacy of phenotypic specificity over genotypic generality, the importance of context and meaning in the constitution of data, and the altering effects of theory on reality, [...] require a change in the role of the investigator so as to include him more intimately in the research process. London considered it useful to substitute an "orientative sample" for the usual representative sample "... to take into account the researcher's new role, especially in the context of amplification." The researcher should put himself in the role of a student, clinician or journalist, trying to learn the world through the eyes and from the words of his dialogue partner, looking for differences and similarities in themes of experiences that could account for divergence and convergence.

London believed that the social sciences could and should permanently draw on advances in the physical and biological sciences, in particular, to study phenomena which exhibit heteromorphic or catalytic tendencies, i.e., divergent amplification, within an expanded scientific framework. Together with Warren Thorngate, in his last major methodological treatise of 1981,

- Divergent Amplification and Social Behavior: Some methodological considerations

he, therefore, offered a review of such recent advances. The implications for research and statistical practice in social psychology were discussed and the scientific advantages of analysing social behaviour in multifarious contexts explained. London and Thorngate came to the conclusion, that while new orientations were "taking hold, and with considerable success, in the various subdisciplines of biological science", the social sciences had deplorably "remained almost isolated from the spreading paradigm." "Not only isolated, but stagnating and crisis-ridden." In their view, "the key to revitalization and progress (had been) in large measure already fashioned conceptually. It needed only "picking up and further shaping for use in the social sciences."

=== Method of research ===
London defined the "idiographic" method of research, most extensively applied by his research team in the making of the book "The Revenge of Heaven: journal of a young Chinese", as a method "where in-depth study of the ′single case′ reveals and illuminates also the embedding general scene – a clear recognition of the necessary fusion of the ′person and the field′ in any multi-faceted comprehension of man in his surround."

Its characteristics can be summarised in the following three principles of interviewing:

1. No preconceived goals and no standardized questionnaire.
2. Thorough preparation for the interview sessions while being open-minded to changes that the course of the interview might take due to the respondent's statements.
3. Strict confinement of the interviewer to the personal experiences of the respondent.

Interview sessions were carefully prepared to create an atmosphere that fostered peer level communications between the interviewer and respondent. Instead of simply leading the respondents through the sessions via a prepared sequence of questions, forcing them to translate their individual experiences into the researcher's general frame of reference, the interviewer would be prepared to be instructed by his respondent and possibly forced to alter his enquiries. The result could end up being unanticipated, or in other words, what London had typified as "divergent amplification".

To secure the relevance and the reliability of information generated from refugee interviews the researcher had to meticulously study the respondent's persona, gain familiarity with all details of his daily life, including his likes and dislikes to understand what this particular individual had personally experienced, seen and accomplished. Only through this very personal record, counterchecked with a multitude of other records of that nature, could the interviewer gain visibility into a social reality that lay beyond his reach. The individual perceptions would coalesce to represent the reality of a given society as a whole.

Together with his wife Miriam London, who was associated with his scholarly career ever since 1950, first as his research assistant, but more as a scholar in her own right during the second half of their marriage until his death, Ivan D. London developed and practised a research strategy which systematically attempted to exclude deterministic averaging – out tendencies and aimed at capturing the unexpected, the divergent and its amplification.

== Miriam London ==
Miriam London was born in Philadelphia as Miriam Boulotchnik on June 27, 1923, to a family who had been living in Paris, France, for some years before they immigrated in 1914 with their young son Maurice to the US.

Determined to get a college degree, Miriam independently pursued – and successfully obtained – scholarship and fellowship awards that fully funded her higher education. At the age of 20 she had earned her A. B. degree in Chemistry at the University of Pennsylvania, where she was an excellent student and elected to Phi Beta Kappa. One year later, she earned her A. M. degree at Radcliffe Graduate School, Harvard Department of Slavic Studies.

Early in 1945 she was appointed an administrative assistant in the Foreign Service Auxiliary and sent to Italy to join a mission that would become the U.S. embassy in Vienna, Austria. Fluent in Russian and French, during her one-and-a-half year sojourn in Europe, she gained experience as a Russian interpreter, studied German and also did some travelling.

After returning to the United States in 1946, she met and then married Ivan D. London in 1947. Between 1948 and 1950 she completed course work toward a Ph.D. degree at the University of Chicago. Miriam London did not complete her dissertation and instead accompanied her husband to the Harvard Research Center where she was later also employed. Together with him she went to New York in 1952, where she would work as a research assistant at Brooklyn College and also teach Russian for some time. Miriam London also participated in the Inwood Project on Intercultural Communication. Within the frame of that research project she co-authored a number of essays and reports of her husband.

- Three flash studies in intercultural communication
- A case study on the reliability of research on foreign peoples
- Respondent-evaluation applied to quotational analysis: a case study.
- A research-examination of the Harvard Project on the Soviet Social System. I. The basic written questionnaire.

When China attracted their attention in the early 1960s and the Londons pondered extending their research to East Asia, Miriam London studied the Chinese vernacular in support of that project. Over the years, she attained a fundamental level of fluency in Chinese, adding to her fluency in French and Russian beyond her native English.

== Scientific legacy ==
=== The London papers ===
A private archive documenting the academic life of Ivan D. London and his wife Miriam London has been transferred to the Hoover Institution Archives at Stanford University in Stanford, California (US) and is registered there as "Ivan D. London papers" under the collection number 83060. It consists of 95 manuscript boxes, two card file boxes and one oversize box (42, 2 linear feet). Boxes 91–98 all still closed but eligible to be opened August 5, 2023. "The remainder of the collection is open for research." The collection consists of materials in English, Russian and Chinese and includes correspondence, writings, questionnaires, interview transcripts, notes, reports, memoranda and printed matters relating to social conditions in the Soviet Union and China. The Inwood Project on Intercultural Communication Records makes up the main body of the collection.

=== Publications ===
In more than 30 years of close collaboration Ivan D. London and Miriam London published most papers and research reports under both their names. In the beginning, Miriam London acted as a research assistant co-authoring her husband's articles and reports. However, in later publications related to China, Miriam London became the primary author, with her husband as co-author. In some cases, papers written by Miriam London were also co-authored by Ta-Ling Lee (born 1933), professor of history at Southern Connecticut State College (US) and associate of the Londons for many years. This continued after the death of Ivan D. London and enabled Miriam London, as a private scholar, the institutional affiliation vital for publication. There is, in fact, only one publication solely authored by Miriam London. However, this publication is included in an anthology of leading scholars of Contemporary China Studies and, hence, demonstrates that not only the Londons as a couple but also Miriam London as an individual scholar enjoyed high esteem in the scholarly world. Her foremost work product, however, was the research report entitled

- The Revenge of Heaven. Journal of a Young Chinese. Ken Ling.

The report, cast in the literary form of a novel, represented a case study of a Chinese high school-student, who fled to Taiwan after participating in Mao's "Cultural Revolution" from the summer of 1966 through the fall of 1967. The report was based on information derived from 300 hours of interviews, 400.000 Chinese characters of additional written statements and another 100.000 characters of written responses to further questions the Londons had posed to the respondent. The book was translated into Chinese, German, French and Thai.

In this project, the role of Ivan D. London had been that of the project leader, methodological mastermind and interviewer. Miriam London designed the outcome of that case study assisted by the linguistic expertise and scrutiny of Professor Ta Ling Lee and Professor Wu Ping-chung.

In order to present the former Red Guard to the public as "a real and genuine character" she chose as a format the autobiographical first person account with Ken Ling, the former Red Guard's pseudonym for the purpose of publishing the report, as the narrator fictitiously reading from his journal. The publication of "The Revenge of Heaven" coincided with a radical change of policies of the PRC and the US towards each other. From February 21 through 28, 1972, the then American President, Richard M. Nixon, visited China by invitation of the Peking government. With that visit, for the first time since the establishment of Communist rule on October 1, 1949, China had become accessible to a larger group of American citizens – specifically, the diplomats, scholars and journalists who accompanied the President. While these American visitors returned home from China deeply impressed by the state of affairs they had been introduced to – no dogs, no flies, no beggars, healthy, well-fed and happily looking citizens, cleaness and modest, but adequate living conditions – the research report of the Londons testified to the contrary. The descriptions Ken Ling delivered about his travelling from his home town Amoy in Southern Fujian up to the North to link-up with Red Guards from other provinces basically resurfaced the classical picture of China during the first half of the 20th century – the land of famine and beggars, breathtaking stench and appalling dirt, prostitution and robbery, and last but not least corruption and embezzlement. The then 16 year old high-school student came across beggars clothed in meager rags who gathered in masses in the railway stations and reached their emaciated arms out for food from the passengers whenever trains came into the station. From the train window, he saw trees stripped off their bark, occasional corpses lying by the tracks, and once even a child's leg. When he visited the countryside high up in Western Fujian he found villages living only on the dregs of squashed sweet potatoes, as their juice was required to be sold to the government, and non-nutritious and tasteless (due to lack of salt) bamboo shoots boiled in water. The peasants had not learnt to read and to write, their language was poor and their bodies were worn out even before they reached adulthood. "The Revenge of Heaven" offered a complete contradiction to the euphoric perceptions of Mao's China prevailing in the Western world.

Within the decade of the 1970s the Londons were able to confirm the veracity of Ken Ling's descriptions, even just on the basis of official reports and documents from the PRC that became available during that time frame. They decided that, in the interest of historical accuracy, it was important in their research to focus on "hunger in Mao's China" for some time and publicly challenge the positions of those experts who championed a distorted projection of the Chinese reality under Mao, and, in some respects had altered it beyond recognition.

Miriam London presented the findings she and her husband had been able to secure on that subject matter in a series of five research papers which at the time provided an extraordinary abundance of source material documenting that from 1960 through 1962, under the leadership of Mao Zedong China had suffered the worst famine in all human history.

Mostly attributed to extreme weather conditions and downplayed as being due to some temporary food shortages by Western "friends of China" and leading "China experts" these so-called "three bitter years" caused an estimated human loss of 50 million deaths from starvation and deficiency diseases. It had directly resulted from Mao's ambitious policy of the so-called "Three Red Banners". Even in the late 1970s hunger, starvation from food shortage and beggars from disaster-stricken areas roaming the big cities were phenomena of major proportions in the PRC.

- The Other China: Hunger. Part I – The Three Red Flags of Death,
- The Other China. Hunger. Part II. The Case of the Missing Beggars,
- The Other China. Hunger. Part III. How do we know China? Let us count the ways...,
- Hunger in China: The "Norm of Truth", und
- Hunger in China: The Failure of a System?

Harvard professor John King Fairbank (1907–1991), the most powerful scholar in the American sinological establishment with an enormous influence within the political establishment of the United States, was the most passionate advocate of Maoist China. In the view of the Londons, first and foremost he had to be drawn to account for the misjudgement of China's totalitarian system and the adulation of its erratic leadership in the West. In a public exchange of arguments, implicitly the initiation of a fresh discourse on American policies towards the PRC, Miriam London and her husband pointed to the fact that "money and prestige add up to power as readily in academe as anywhere else. The academic power centers, thus created," they continued, "not only tend to nurture such ills as 'consensus scholarship', whereby 'top scholars' agree to agree about certain data and methods, in this way establishing an unassailable 'authoritative position', these centers can also function to bury or discredit the alternative viewpoints so necessary to the pursuit of knowledge." And they asked "the powerful sinological establishment at Harvard and its academic outposts" whether "accurate knowledge of the flesh-and-blood realities of China under Mao emerged from their generously financed research, or rather from the works of a few outsiders and foreigners, often operating on a shoestring."

"The Revenge of Heaven" evolved within the context of the much broader scale, in terms of time frame and substance, research on the PRC being engaged in by Ivan D. and Miriam London. The Londons had not anticipated publishing a special research account of the proportions of a whole book when they started interviewing the former Red Guard (a.k.a. Ken Ling) in the summer of 1969. The same can be said of their studies on "hunger in China". These studies resulted from the fact, that within the academe their book was heavily criticized – not only by sinologists, but economists and scholars of other social science disciplines as well – on the basis of the popular believe that "whatever else you can say about Mao, at least everyone in China now gets enough food". However, their research on the social system of the PRC was by far more diverse than in hindsight it would seem after the Londons had become renowned for belonging to the very few scholars worldwide who had been honest and brave enough to tell the truth about hunger and beggars in China long before the Communist leaders of that country themselves discovered the truth. The real scope of the London's research work on China can be measured by the selection of titles listed below:

- Attitudes of mainland youth toward traditional Chinese customs and beliefs
- Three stories from the Chinese countryside
- Christ in China and China: The Uses of Religion,
- The Education of Mun-Yee: A Case Study of a schoolgirl in Canton.
- The Gang of Fourteen: Street Life in China
- Prostitution in Canton und
- Two Poems from a Chinese Underground

=== Significance ===
If it makes sense at all after more than 30 years of their close collaboration, to evaluate the significance and accomplishments of Ivan D. and Miriam London separately, it seems appropriate on one hand to emphasize the methodology Ivan D. London contributed to the social sciences, in particular, to psychology and political science. His theoretical conceptualization of an idiographic approach supplementing the conventional nomothetic way of scientific dealing with social phenomena has remained valuable in the context of method reflection up to the present. The application of that approach – often poked fun at, if not bluntly disparaged by the "experts" in the early 1970s – was finally recognized as a revolutionary accomplishment. Indeed, "the ′uniqueness of the individual′ cast light on the many". On the other hand, Miriam London was the one "who possessed the requisite literary sense and skill", as Ivan D. London himself observed, for transforming the results of their in-depth research into reports of various refinement ranging from novel to scholarly essay and scientific argument.

The unorthodox novel-like research report "The Revenge of Heaven" and a number of rather conventional research reports unmasked the prevailing sinological orthodoxy. That was doubtlessly both the Londons' accomplishment. As outsiders to the field of Contemporary Chinas Studies, they taught a lesson of timeless validity to the academe all over the non-communist world: No political system can camouflage the social and economic conditions of a given country when social science principles are rigorously employed. It only takes intellectual honesty and an appropriate method to tear down the barriers intended to hide reality.

Words of praise and admiration for the scholarly contributions of Ivan D. and Miriam London to Contemporary China Studies are scattered in various monographs, articles in anthologies and footnotes to scholarly essays. Out of gratitude for their research accomplishments, Jürgen Domes (1932–2001), professor of political science, University of the Saarland in Saarbrücken, Germany, dedicated to them his study of the Sociology of the People's Republic of China, published in German in 1980. After Ivan D. London's death in 1983, Domes in 1985 dedicated to Ivan D. London his English monograph "The Government and Politics of the PRC. A Time of Transition" appreciating, in particular, the

great methodological care and admirable research spirit he and his wife had applied in the attempt to understand the basic realities of life in China under Communist rule by interviewing refugees and Chinese living abroad.

Pierre Ryckmans (a.k.a. Simon Leys) (1935–2014), reader in Chinese, Australian National University in Canberra in a public argument with one of his Australian colleagues noted:

Any scholar working on contemporary China is familiar with the admirable contributions of Ivan and Miriam London; even undergraduates know their writings (some of them are already classics).

In 1980, Murray Levine (1928–2020) psychologist and professor at the State University of New York, Buffalo (US), stated:

London (1961, 1974, 1975, 1977) has tried to develop both a philosophy of method and a system of discipline for dealing with data derived from direct human experience, using observers who are participants in events. His use of a novelist to make dramatic sense of experience [...] has not yet received the attention it deserves.

Warren Thorngate, professor of social psychology, Carleton University in Ottawa, Canada, dedicated his treatise on "The Production, Detection and Explanation of Behavioural Patterns", of 1986 to the memory of Ivan D. London. He particularly emphasized the brilliance of Ivan London and his dedication to scholarship. He acknowledged him as an "extraordinary man". Thorngate wrote:

I think we have much to learn from the examples of Ivan and Miriam London. For the past quarter century they have [...] gather[ed] stories of the lives of hundred of individuals, and trace[d] the sources of convergence and divergence within and between them. [...] Additionally, they have written extensively on research and interview methods necessary to gather relevant information. [...] Their work deserves close attention.
