= Yizhen =

Yizhen may refer to:

- Yizhen, the main setting of Born Red
- Yizheng

Yi Zhen Lin is an eye dot
