= China watcher =

Analyst of Chinese politics, especially for Western audiences

A China watcher, or, less frequently, Pekingologist, is a person who researches and/or reports on the politics of the People's Republic of China for western consumption, especially in a Cold War context. "China watching" was coined by analogy to birdwatching, which takes place from a distance. It represents a semantic break from the earlier term China Hands, which referred to knowledgeable businesspeople who made political commentary from inside mainland China: after the Chinese Communist Revolution, China watchers more frequently had backgrounds in academia, rather than business, and operated out of consulates in Hong Kong.

"China watcher" should not be confused for Sinologist, which can loosely refer to anyone who studies China, but, especially in the United States, more frequently refers to those who study classical language, literature, or civilization. In other languages, where the term Pekingologist does not exist, the usage of these terms are less rigidly delineated. In French for instance, the term sinologue would refer to both a researcher in Sinology and a reporter of Pekingology.

== History and nature of China watching ==
=== Cold War era ===
During the Cold War, China watchers centered in Hong Kong and many of them simultaneously worked for Western intelligence agencies, universities, and news organizations. Much of their reporting would be previewed by the British colonial government's secretariat, to prepare for diplomatic consequences. Of the various nationalities of China watcher, the Americans were the most prolific, due to the activity of the Consulate General of the United States, Hong Kong and Macau. Mutual distrust between the United States and China and the prohibition of travel between the countries meant that American China watchers did not have access to press briefings or interviews. Therefore, China watchers adopted techniques from Kremlinology, such as the close parsing of official announcements for hidden meanings, movements of officials reported in newspapers, and analysis of photographs of public appearances. China watchers would also interview refugees from mainland China, or reprint analysis from Taiwan or the Soviet Union.

Prominent China watchers in Hong Kong in the first decades after the Chinese Communist Revolution included László Ladány and Pierre Ryckmans. Publications by the Consulate-General, which were frequently cited by China-watchers (some of whom did not speak Chinese) included Survey of the China Mainland Press, Current Background, and Selections from Mainland China Magazines. These publications emphasized problems and contradictions in national policy, violence, and atrocity, ignoring topics like education or culture unless there was an associated controversy. In the years since the reform and opening up, China watchers can live in China and take advantage of normal sources of information. Others remained in Hong Kong, however. The Hong Kong journalist Willy Wo-Lap Lam has been called the "quintessential China watcher, practiced in the art of Pekingology," whose "scope is wide, but the focus of his analysis is the Zhongnanhai and factional manoeuvring among the political elite."

=== Post-Cold War era ===
Since the collapse of the Soviet Union, China became seen as a major United States antagonist, which has caused more interest in China from strategists, including China watchers, rather than just sinologists. Sinologists have since lost ground in shaping the US policy on China, and have claimed that strategists "don't understand China". According to Washington officials, there is "a desire for a new cold war", and The Economist wrote "expertise about China is not necessary" for China watchers, while doveish China experts lost their advisory role to the White House.

== Criticism ==
The credibility of China watchers has been subject to criticism, as many China watchers predicted extreme and conflicting scenarios, either a collapse of the PRC's economy, political system or nation, or PRC domination. In particular, China watchers have claimed that the CPC is struggling to hold on to power, however the party proved to be adaptable. During the COVID-19 pandemic, China watchers were prominently featured in media reports claiming lockdowns as authoritarian measures, with support for this policy by the scientific community receiving considerably less attention.
