= Chinese Shadows =

Book by Simon Leys

- English edition
- Author: Pierre Ryckmans (Simon Leys)
- Original title: Ombres chinoises
- Language: English
- Subject: Chinese Cultural Revolution
- Genre: Non-fiction
- Publisher: Viking Press
- Publication date: 1974
- Publication place: United States
- English publication date: 1977
- Pages: 220 pp
- ISBN: 0-670-21918-5

Chinese Shadows is a book written by Simon Leys, which is the pseudonym for Belgian Sinologist Pierre Ryckmans. It was originally published in the French language in 1974 under the title Ombres chinoises, and was then translated into English in 1977. The book is about Leys' six-month stay in China, which he made in 1972. Leys discusses the cultural and political destruction of the People's Republic of China by Mao Zedong, who was the chairman of the Chinese Communist Party at the time. He wrote under a pseudonym since, like other academics and journalists who refrained from criticizing China, he did not want to be barred from future visits to Beijing (Peking).

== Chronology of events ==
Important events that were mentioned in the book:

- 1949: Establishment of People's Republic of China
- 1956-57: Hundred Flowers Movement
- 1957: Anti-Rightist Movement
- 1958-59: Great Leap Forward
- 1968-1969: Cultural Revolution
- 1968: Down to the Countryside Movement

== Overview ==
The translation starts with a foreword by Leys to address the criticism the book has received. He states that he does not want to question the achievements of the regime, but is adding some shadows by offering notes and details that have been omitted by other witnesses. There is also a foreword to the English-language edition where he states that China is "unreal" because the Maoist authorities stage settings that are artificially created for foreign visitors, and they prevent contact between foreigners and the Chinese people.

Leys argues that foreigners do not see the real China, they only see what the authorities allow them to see. When they are in China, they are limited to the areas they are allowed to visit. Out of the hundreds of cities, there are only about a dozen that are open to foreigners, and most of these places are in urban areas. However, the majority of Chinese people live in rural areas, and foreigners do not have access to these locations. Most visitors also travel around with an interpreter or a guide, which are usually provided by the government. These “professional friends” get paid well to live in Beijing, and make sure that the visitors do not do anything out of the ordinary. Foreigners are also discouraged from forming friendships with the natives of the country, which results in them socializing with only the servants. The government has done everything in its power to prevent contact between the foreigner and the native, and there are visitors that live there for a long period of time without forming any real friendships. Leys gives the example of not being able to use public transit, and not going to native eating places. When using public transit such as the train, there are special lounges that are reserved just for foreigners. There is no way to avoid this segregation, and when foreigners try to, there are negative consequences to the local residents.

Chinese people are limited to the areas they are allowed to visit in their own cities. They are not allowed into luxurious hotels and clubs that are for foreigners, unless they are on official business. There are also certain museums and monuments that they cannot enter. The Maoist government has built a wall between people, including Chinese people that come back from abroad to visit. They have arranged this category of visitors into four groups: Chinese who have taken out foreign citizenship, compatriots from Taiwan, overseas Chinese, and compatriots from Hong Kong and Macao. All these groups are treated differently while they are visiting. For example, Chinese with a foreign citizenship are treated like other foreigners. In one situation, a man went to visit his family in their home and spent the night. The next day he was told that he had to sleep in his hotel, but he was welcome to visit. The government has instilled a fear in their citizens, to the point where they even treat family members as foreigners.

The authorities destroyed China's cultural heritage and Leys describes the different areas that he visited during his stay in China, and the situation in each one. Guangdong was rundown, but the atmosphere was more relaxed compared to Beijing. There was also less interference from the central government and more outside influence, so foreigners are able to go to public places without causing a commotion. However, this less favored area faced poverty and also had a problem with juvenile delinquency. The delinquents were usually young urban people that were sent to the countryside to correct their behavior during the Cultural Revolution. They were often deported from their family, and were under army guidance, so their behavior was understandable. Other areas that Leys visited included Tianjin, Beidaihe, Lianzhou, Zhengzhou, Anyang, Hefei, Shanghai, Suzhou and Hangzhou. When traveling between provinces, foreigners are required to carry a pass that lists the places they are allowed to visit in detail, and the document must be stamped by security officials when you arrive, and when you depart. If a foreigner was to show up in a province unexpected, they would not be allowed to go and wander the city because they do not have permission to be there, instead they would be encouraged to stay in the hotel until their next train arrived.

In the following chapter, Leys includes A Short Hagiographic Interlude about Shi Chuanxiang, who was an example of one of the individuals the Maoist authorities tried to emulate. He also includes a chapter titled A Short Philosophical Interlude to discuss two best selling books, Vade-mecum of the Pig Breeder and A Short History of European Philosophy, which illustrated the life of the intellectuals after the revolution.

The professional bureaucratic life is very different from that of the common citizen. The Maoist authorities have an obsession with hierarchical classes and we see an example of this through the model of cars that the officials drive. Mao was a big supporter of the Soviet Union and they also had a system of hierarchical classes. The Maoist bureaucracy had thirty hierarchical classes, and each one had specific prerogatives and privileges. The officials that were at the top of the hierarchy had more influence and power and also had more advantages and privileges than those beneath them. There was clearly a separation between the ruling and the ruled. Leys used the example of Wang Shiwei who was a revolutionary that wrote a letter to the government to address this issue. In the letter he mentions the class differences and accuses the superiors of acting like they "belong to a different breed of humanity" by having all the food they can eat while the rest of the people suffer. Wang Shiwei had to attend public accusation meetings after this incident, and in one meeting he criticized Stalin directly, which resulted in authorities trying the case behind closed doors. He ended disappearing from view for two years and when his friends were able to find him, he said he was now making matchboxes. When the Communists had to evacuate Yan'an they could not take him as their prisoner so he was shot because they did not want to leave any witnesses behind.

Wang Shiwei was one of the many people that were killed because of their opinions. The Maoist regime waged a war against the mind and went after the Chinese intellectuals in 1957 in the Hundred Flowers Campaign. The campaign was used by the Chinese Communist Party to get citizens to express their opinions about the communist party so they could make the country better. However, the government had a change of heart which resulted in the Anti-Rightist Movement from the campaign, and those who were critical about the regime were punished. Some intellectuals were dismissed and sent to the countryside to work in the fields and factories while others were killed or committed suicide. In a speech by Mao, he claimed that “Ch’in Shih Huang Ti executed four hundred and sixty scholars" and they had executed forty-six thousand. The intellectuals, writers, and artists in China were close to extinction and the ones that were left were silenced.

With all the intellectuals gone, and the revolution still going on, most schools were closed for at least four years. When Leys tried to visit the universities, he was not granted access to the lectures or teaching material they were using. In secondary schools, students were made to do farm work and were not getting the necessary education. By destroying the history of China, the Maoist government has moved to an age of totalitarian dictatorship and made the younger generation have a loss of culture.

There is only so much that people can suffer before they decide to rage against the ruling class. The Papaoshan cemetery is where the officials of the regime are buried, and to show their anger against bureaucrats, the mob started breaking their tombs.

The book concludes with "A Short Critical Bibliography" which recommends books which include

- Origins of the Chinese Revolution by Lucien Bianco
- A History of the Chinese Communist Party: I, 1921-1949 by Jacques Guillermaz.
- A History of the Chinese Communist Party: II: The Chinese Party in Power: 1949-1976 by Jacques Guillermaz

== Cultural destruction ==
Simon Leys fell in love with China when he traveled there for the first time in 1955. When he went back in 1972, he had already known the city walls in Beijing were razed, but he was seized by panic when he discovered the monumental gates were demolished as well. Mao had destroyed many historical and cultural buildings around China, as well as any artifacts that were reminders of the feudal past.

"If the destruction of the entire legacy of China's traditional culture was the price to pay to insure the success of the revolution, I would forgive all the iconoclasms, I would support them with enthusiasm! What makes the Maoist vandalism so odious and so pathetic is not that it is irreparably mutilating an ancient civilization but rather that by doing so it gives itself an alibi for not grappling with the true revolutionary tasks."

The reason Leys believes Beijing was destroyed was because it had a lot of imperial tradition. He refers to the Monument to the People's Heroes as the "Maoist rape of the ancient capital". The monument is placed in Tiananmen Square, and is more than a hundred feet high. According to Leys, the monument "disrupts and annihilates the energy-field of the old capital in order to give its power a foundation of prestige."

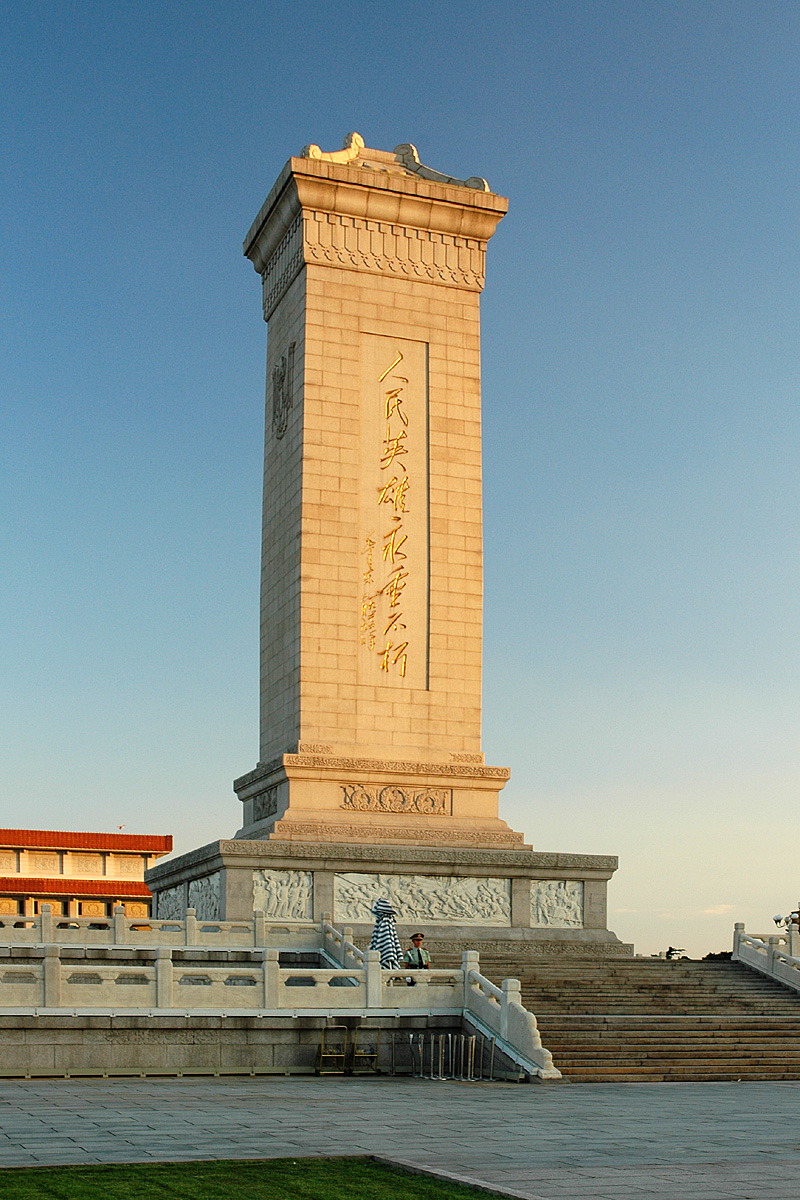
Monument to the People's Heroes

Leys often quotes George Orwell’s book Nineteen Eighty-Four, which was written before the Cultural Revolution, but could be used to describe China. He states that it has "more truth and accuracy than researchers who come back from Peking [Beijing].” When Mao led the Great Leap Forward campaign, his aim was to transform the country, but it led to the Great Chinese Famine instead. For several years, the cultural activity in China ceased to exist. Many institutions were closed, including schools, museums, and bookstores. Museums are usually dedicated to those who are in charge, so they could not be reopen until history had been rewritten. When bookstores and museums finally reopened, nearly all of the history was eliminated and changed. Bookstores were set up like pharmacies with a counter between the customer and employee, and in the National Library of China all literature that did not conform to Maoist orthodoxy was removed. There was also irreparable damages and looting to temples, monasteries and monuments. Those that were not razed were used as warehouses, workshops, or garbage dumps. To make it seem like the revolution did not destroy the Chinese cultural heritage, the government staged a "cultural renaissance" by claiming that they found archaeological objects. In order to restore the traditional image, they only needed enough objects to make the foreigners believe that they had enriched the cultural heritage rather than destroyed it. Many of the monuments were only open to foreigners and overseas Chinese, and were forbidden to the residents of China. Some monuments could only be seen by foreigners if they made an appointment, and even then, they were given a hard time when trying to access some locations. The residents were restricted access to bookstores and art galleries as well. The authorities feared that if the Chinese people had contact with their past, they would be contaminated, so they did everything in their power to prevent this.

Chinese traditional opera was very popular in China before Mao's wife Jiang Qing was in charge of production. She formed the alliance of the Gang of Four, which controlled the media and propaganda in China. Leys describes the Maoist propaganda as "one of the most monotonous, arid, and indigent creations in the world." The reason it was "condemned to death" was due to the fact that it was able to educate even the illiterate about China's three-thousand-year-old history.

The destruction and damage of old monuments and temples were organized on a large scale by the Maoist regime and the Red Guards. Some of these that were mentioned include:

| Monument/Temple | Location | Condition |
|---|---|---|
| Gate of China | Beijing | destroyed |
| Beijing city fortifications | Beijing | destroyed |
| Xu Beihong House-Museum | Beijing | destroyed |
| Temple of the Great Buddha (three caves of Yenxia sandong) | Hangzhou | destroyed |
| Yue Fei Temple | Hangzhou | closed |
| The Fangsheng Monastery | Hangzhou | destroyed |
| Tomb of Fan Zhongyan | Tienping Hill | destroyed |
| Tomb of Yelü Chucai | Beijing | disappeared |
| Temple of the Six Banyan Trees | Guangzhou | restored and maintained |
| Palace of Eternal Harmony (Temple of the Lamas) | Beijing | restored |
| Zhenjue Temple | Beijing | used for study groups on Mao Zedong Thought |
| Temple of Confucius | Beijing | closed down and closely guarded |
| Temple of the White Dagoba (Beihai Park) | Beijing | used as a warehouse and refuse dump |
| Fayuan Monastery and Buddhist Association | Beijing | closed |
| Niujie Mosque | Beijing | closed and abandoned |
| Tianning Temple | Beijing | inaccessible |
| Balizhuang Pagoda | Beijing | bad condition |
| Temple of Boyun Guan | Beijing | army barracks |
| Taishan Temple | Beijing | converted into offices |
| Wanshou Temple | Beijing | sleeping quarters for workmen |
| Temple of Guan Yu and White Horse Temple | Luoyang | unknown |
| Temple of the Western Garden | Suzhou | garden open to the public |
| Temple of the City Gods | Xi'an | warehouse |

== Critical reception ==
Chinese Shadows has earned mixed reviews from critics.

In Peggy Durdin's review, she states that it was the "most illuminating book so far written about the Chinese People's Republic.". Durdin was very knowledgeable in this field and was a foreign correspondent and writer that covered Asia. She was born in China, attended the Shanghai American School, and after she left she continued to have an interest in the country. Durdin agrees with Leys that the majority of visitors that travel to China do not see how the Chinese people live, and that they are controlled by a small group of men.

A review by Benjamin Schwartz, who is also a Sinologist, is more critical. He says that the book is informative and well written, but "Leys provides us with what is probably the most spirited and witty hostile report ever written." Like Durdin, he recognizes Leys' love of Chinese culture, but finds it difficult that one person is able to easily generalize about a large population in China.

Sally Borthwick wrote a book about the education and social change in China, and she thinks that Leys account of his stay in Beijing could be seen as an attack on China. She believes that the book is bitter and that Leys makes it seem like there is no chance for China to reform in its current system. "One of the confusing things about his book is the use of "Maoist" to cover everything the author dislikes, including much to which Mao objected - bureaucratism, for example - and much which was unrelated to him." Borthwick believes that the book is stereotyping the country, and that the West needs to have a better relationship with China in order to have an understanding of its people.

== References and further reading ==
- Six, Laurent (2008), "Aux origines d’Ombres chinoises: une mission de six mois au service de l’ambassade de Belgique en République populaire de Chine," Textyles [Online], 34 (2008) (posted 15 October 2011; visited 29 October 2014).
- Leys, Simon (1977), "Chinese Shadows", The New York Review of Books, 26 May 1977 - article drawn in part from the book of the same name.
- Childs, Martin (2014), "Professor Pierre Ryckmans: Sinologist and one of the first to reveal the shocking reality behind China's Cultural Revolution", The Independent, 9 October 2014.
- Friedman, Edward (1978). "Simon Leys Hates China: America Loves Leys, Simon" (PDF). Bulletin of Concerned Asian Scholars. 10 (3): 19–27. doi:10.1080/14672715.1978.10409097. Archived from the original (PDF) on 2016-01-31.
