= The Death of Napoleon =

1986 novella by Belgian/Australian author Simon Leys

- Original French language edition La Mort de Napoléon (1986)
- Author: Simon Leys
- Original title: La Mort de Napoléon
- Translator: Patricia Clancy and Simon Leys
- Language: English
- Genre: Literary novel
- Publisher: Éditions Hermann
- Publication date: 1986
- Publication place: Australia
- Media type: Print
- Pages: 119 pp.
- Awards: 1992 New South Wales Premier's Literary Awards — Christina Stead Prize for Fiction, winner
- ISBN: 270566050X

The Death of Napoleon is a 1986 novella by the Belgian/Australian author Simon Leys, originally published in France by Éditions Hermann. It was translated, from the original French, into English in 1991 by Patricia Clancy and the author.

It was the winner of the 1992 New South Wales Premier's Literary Awards, Christina Stead Prize for Fiction. This prize was awarded for the English translation.

== Synopsis ==
Napoleon escapes from his prison on Saint Helena, disguised as a pudgy cabin hand on board a ship, leaving behind a double. His aim is to re-enter France and re-establish his power base. But his ship is rerouted from Bourdeaux to Antwerp and he enters Europe alone and with no support. As he travels back into France he visits the battlefield at Waterloo which has now been turned into a tourist attraction.

== Critical reception ==
Reviewing the English translation for The Times Literary Supplement, D. J. Enright called the novel "an elegant and engaging piece of alternative history, gently tragic and wryly comic".

In The Age, Peter Craven saw much greater depths in the novella beyond the simple story of its plot: "The Death of Napoleon is only in the pretextual sense a novella about Bonaparte. 'Napoleon' is rather the form of words that comes to stand for an identity that is foresaken, the forlornness of the self that is unacknowledged and finds no image in the world's mirror."

== Publication history ==
- 1986 Éditions Hermann, France (in the original French)
- 1991 Quartet Books, UK
- 1991 Allen & Unwin, Australia
- 1992 Farrar Straus and Giroux, USA
- 1993 Picador, UK
- 2002 Labor, Belgium (in the original French)
- 2006 Black Inc., Australia

== Awards ==
- 1992 New South Wales Premier's Literary Awards, winner

== See also ==
- 1991 in Australian literature
