= László Ladány =

Rev. László Ladányi (January 14, 1914 - September 23, 1990), in English also spelled Ladány or Ladany, was a Hungarian Jesuit, China watcher, author and editor of China News Analysis, an influential periodical on Chinese affairs.

== Biography ==
Ladányi was born in Diósgyőr, Hungary, in 1914. He initially wanted to become a violinist and trained as such, but in 1936 he entered the Jesuit order. He also went to China that year, living first in Peking and then Shanghai.

After the end of the Chinese civil war in 1949 László Ladányi and other Jesuits were forced to flee China, and he settled in Hong Kong. He began publishing China News Analysis in 1953 from the University of Hong Kong, and became well known by China watchers and journalists around the world. Ladányi based his assessments and conclusions mainly on readings of official Chinese documents, and was consistently critical of Chinese Communist Party (CCP) rule.

Ladányi, who was variously called a "fanatical anti-Communist" by critics and as "the most exact and consistently correct observer" of mainland Chinese politics by admirers, possessed what Simon Leys called an "uncanny ability" to draw meaning out of often cryptic official Chinese documents. Jürgen Domes described him as having attained "unprecedented prestige as a China scholar, [...] the doyen of the international community of observers of contemporary Chinese politics".

== Publications ==
Ladányi served as the sole editor of China News Analysis from its founding until 1982, when he left the journal to pursue a career as an author. The Sinologist Simon Leys (pseudonym for the art historian and man of letters, Pierre Ryckmans) gleaned much information from Ladányi's China News Analysis, which he called "super." Leys made frequent use of this material in his 1971 book Les Habits neufs du président Mao. In 1975 that book was awarded the Prix Jean Walter, prix d’histoire et de sociologie by the Académie française and in 1978 it was published in English as The Chairman's New Clothes.

The scholar of Chinese law, Pitman B. Potter reviewed Law and Legality in China Quarterly. He called it "useful and challenging", and found that its use of official Chinese sources gives the analysis a "certain credibility", but tends to present an "overly unified picture" with little indication of policy debates and problems of implementation. Potter adds that this "bleak picture" stands in contrast to the "glowing and somewhat idealistic" presentation of law in traditional China in the beginning of the book, and that Ladányi does not point out the aspects of law in the People's Republic that were not CCP inventions, but present in imperial China's law codes.

== Philosophy ==
In the final edition of China News Analysis for which Ladányi served as editor, he compiled a "ten commandments" describing his philosophy on the study and assessment of contemporary Chinese politics:

1. Remember that no one living in a free society ever has a full understanding of life in a regimented society.

2. Look at China through Chinese spectacles; if one looks at it through foreign glasses, one is thereby trying to make sense of Chinese events in terms of our own problems.
3. Learn something about other Communist countries.
4. Study the basic tenets of Marxism.
5. Keep in mind that words and terms do not have the same meaning in a Marxist society as they do elsewhere.
6. Keep your common sense: the Chinese may have the particular characteristics of Chinese, but they are human beings, and therefore have normal reactions of human beings.
7. People are not less important than issues; they are probably more so. A group may adopt the programme of those who oppose it in order to retain power.
8. Do not believe that you know all the answers. China poses more questions than it provides answers.
9. Do not lose your sense of humour. A regimented press is too serious to be taken very seriously.

10. Above all, read the small print!

— László Ladányi, China News Analysis, Dec 1982

== Publications ==
- China News Analysis, editor, (1953 - 1982)
- The Communist Party of China and Marxism 1921-85: A Self Portrait. London: C. Hurst & Co. Publishers Ltd., 1988; Stanford, Calif: Hoover Institution Press, Stanford University; Hoover Press Publication; 1988.
- The Law and Legality in China: the testament of a China-watcher, edited by Jürgen Domes and Marie-Luise Näth. Honolulu: University of Hawai Press, 1992, ISBN 0-8248-1473-8 (table of contents) and London: C. Hurst & Co. Publishers Ltd., 1992. ISBN 1-85065-136-1

== References and further reading ==
- Potter, Pitman B. (1994), "Review", China Quarterly (137): 251–252, doi:10.1017/S0305741000034354, S2CID 154146433
