= China News Analysis =

China News Analysis was a newsletter analyzing Chinese political and social trends. The newsletter was founded at the University of Hong Kong in 1953 by Rev. László Ladány, who served as its only editor from 1953 to 1982. According to Ladány, it was "the only English newsletter about China based on Chinese sources," published "with the purpose of serving all those who want to follow events inside China."

It was published weekly until 1979, and thereafter became bi-weekly. Following Ladány's retirement as editor, there was a brief lapse in publication until January 1984, when the newsletter continued under a new editorial team. The newsletter relocated to Taiwan in 1994, and continued publishing until December 1998.

Simon Leys described the journal as "compulsory reading for all those who wished to be informed of Chinese political developments—scholars, journalists, diplomats." Its value, he wrote, was that all information and analysis was drawn from Chinese official sources.
