= Born Red =

1987 autobiography of Gao Yuan

- Author: Gao Yuan
- Genre: Autobiography
- Publisher: Stanford University Press
- Publication date: 1987

Born Red: A Chronicle of the Cultural Revolution is an autobiography of Gao Yuan (Chinese: 高原; pinyin: Gāo Yuán, born 1952) and his recollection of experiences during the Cultural Revolution in China. Stanford University Press is the publisher. The foreword was written by William Joseph. At the time Gao Yuan was a post-graduate student at Stanford University.

Stanley Rosen of the Journal of Asian Studies said that the book was aimed at audiences broader than just specialists in China. Rosen said that the book "does not provide enough chronological detail or related political information to anchor the general reader in the larger milieu" but that the foreword, which he called "admirable", "fills in most of these gaps".

Lucian W. Pye, author of a book review for The China Quarterly, wrote that Born Red "is a step-by-step, blow-by-blow account of how a bright Chinese middle-school student went about "making revolution," the name Red Guards gave their blend of high jinks and vicious cruelty." He argued that the book "is another big nail in the coffin of the once popular theory that the Cultural Revolution was a consciousness raising [sic], idealism inspiring movement".

== Structure ==
Within the book, author Gao Yuan changed the names of all of the local place names. He also changed all of the names of his classmates because they "all, innocent or guilty, were caught up in a movement beyond anyone's ability to control".

The primary setting is Yizhen Number One Middle School in Yizhen, a county seat in Hebei. Because of its location, the central government of the People's Republic of China has indirect influence in the events documented in the book. After the military takes control of the town, Red Guards torture members of rival factions to death. Jonathan Unger, a book reviewer for The Australian Journal of Chinese Affairs, wrote that this was "more horrific than anything ever recounted to me during interviews with former Red Guards from Canton."

=== Story ===
The book is a recreation of a diary of Gao Jianhua, who later changed his given name to "Yuan", spanning 1966 to early 1969. According to Gao Yuan's testimony, originally the Red Guards had a noble goal in ending corruption but the movement deteriorated. At first the students at the school of Gao Jianhua (now Gao Yuan) gain the power to attack their teachers and leave school when they were not supposed to. In one portion of the story, the students, now free from school, travel around China, often while having no money. In the absence of the school's discipline, the students begin to turn on one another. Pye wrote that the "playfulness" of the movement decays into a "wanderlust of street-smart, child delinquents" who abuse others and kill defenseless people. Ultimately, out of Gao Jianhua's class of 50 students, over 6 were killed due to injuries, murder, or suicide. Almost that number of the almost 200 teachers at Gao Jianhua's school died.

At the end, according to the book, the perpetrators of the killings were expelled from the Communist Party. According to Timothy Tung, a book reviewer for The New York Times, the perpetrators "were let off easily". The postscript stated that one of the leaders became a wealthy capitalist and had asked Gao Yuan to return to China "soon or you'll be left behind!"

Tung concluded that "This book is the most detailed account of those difficult years I have read. Have the horrors been exaggerated? The book was written from memory and reads like a novel. One cannot help questioning the accuracy of some of the details. But incredible as the events may seem, they are believable."

== Characters ==
Many children growing up at the time of the Cultural Revolution had names that were meant to be revolutionary, so names included Jianhua (construct China), Weihua (safeguard China), Fanxiu (anti-revisionist), Kangmei (resist the United States), and Yuanchao (aid Korea).

=== Gao family ===
- Gao Jianhua (simplified Chinese: 高建华; traditional Chinese: 高建華; pinyin: Gāo Jiànhuá)
  - Gao Jianhua, born in 1952, is a member of Class 85 of Yizhen Number One Middle School, and the main character. Jianhua, who lives in Yizhen, is 14 years old when the Cultural Revolution begins.
  - The author, Gao Yuan, was originally known as Gao Jianhua (Jianhua means "construct China"), but he changed his name because, after the Cultural Revolution, he believed that it was too common. Gao's grandfather had an alternate name, after the poet Qu Yuan. Gao also said that his new given name means highland, which describes the edge of the loess plateau in northern China, where he was born.
- Gao Shangui (高山桂; Gāo Shānguì)
  - Shangui is Jianhua's father. His name means "mountain laurel". He serves as a county government head in Hebei. Despite being a loyal Communist veteran, he is persecuted by the Red Guards.
- Gao Weihua (高维华; 高维華; Gāo Wéihuá)
  - Jianhua's older brother, born around 1950 during the beginning of the Korean War. His name means "safeguard China".
- Gao Zhihua (高指华; 高指華; Gāo Zhǐhuá)
  - Jianhua's first younger brother. His name means "command China".
- Gao Xinghua (高兴华; 高興華; Gāo Xīnghuá)
  - Jianhua's second younger brother. His name means "make China flourish".
- Gao Meiyuan
  - Jianhua's first younger sister. Her name suggests beauty and refinement.
- Gao Yiyuan
  - Jianhua's second younger sister. Her name is a reference to Yizhen, where she was born.

=== Yizhen Number One Middle School people ===
Yizhen Number One Middle School (nicknamed "Yizhong") is Gao Jianhua's school, and many of the main characters originate from the school.

Gail Hershatter of The American Historical Review said that Gao Yuan's peers "were capable of extreme dedication, courage, generosity, selfishness, and murderous violence", whether as individuals or as part of the political factions that arose. Many of the members of Class 85 were known amongst each other by a series of nicknames.

- Erchou (二臭 Èrchòu)
  - Erchou is a member of Class 85. His nickname means "two foul odors" and refers to his flatulence. Gao Yuan said that Erchou blamed sweet potatoes for the predicament. Erchou later becomes Jianhua's ally in their Cultural Revolution political faction.
- Little Bawang (小霸王 Xiǎo Bàwáng)
  - Little Bawang is a member of Class 85. His nickname means "little overlord" and refers to a general from the Three Kingdoms period. Bawang becomes a member of a rival political faction.
- Little Mihu (小迷糊 Xiǎo Míhu)
  - Little Mihu is a member of Class 85. His nickname means "little muddle", and he received it because he was accident prone and often tripped over chamberpots. Mihu becomes a member of a rival political faction.
- Wen Xiu – The Class 85 homeroom teacher
- Lin Sheng – The vice principal. His students drive him to suicide.
- Wuxiang (五香 Wǔxiāng) – The cook, who likes the male students. His name means "five spices".
- Shuanggen (S:双根, T:雙根, P: Shuānggēn) – His name means "double roots". He travels with Jianhua to the urbanized areas. He later joins the rival political faction.
- Sanxi (三喜 Sānxǐ)
  - His name means "triple happiness".
- Yuanchao (援朝 Yuáncháo)
  - His name means "aid Korea".
- Kangmei (抗美 Kàngměi)
  - Yuanchao's younger sister. Her name means "resist the United States".
- Huantian (S:换天, T:換天, P: Huàntiān)
  - Her name means "changing heaven".

== Reception ==
Gail Hershatter, author of the "Born Red/Life and Death in Shanghai" book review of The American Historical Review, said that Born Red "stands out for the immediacy of its portrait of the Red Guards" and "is powerful, compelling, and deeply disturbing precisely because it refuses to impose retrospective interpretation or an adult voice in the events of those years."

Stanley Rosen of the Journal of Asian Studies said that even though "[one] might argue that [Born Red] is less exciting than The Revenge of Heaven; less timely than Red Guard; less personally moving than Son of the Revolution, which also covered a wider span; and less politically sophisticated than Les années rouges. Rosen said that, despite this, the book is "extremely well written and absorbing, adds considerably to our understanding of this period" and "[in] some respects", "surpasses the other accounts". Rosen adds that "[n]o previous work conveys the absurdities of the Red Guard movement as effectively as Born Red".

Pye wrote that the work "adds little" to what is known about the movement but that it "is excellent in providing a vivid Red Guard perspective on how one thing led to another as slogan shouting gave way to torture and fighting". Pye added that "we can be thankful that Gao Yuan spares us the standard Chinese moralizing" trying to reduce Mao Zedong's responsibility and largely shifting it to the Gang of Four.

Unger wrote that the story was "wonderfully told" and "Gao Yuan's portrayal of his attitudes and knowledge as a teenager" was the strength of the work. Unger argued its weakness was not giving "comprehension than the teenaged Gao Yuan as to why China's students exploded into conflict".

Clive M. Ansley, a book reviewer for Pacific Affairs wrote "This volume belongs on the shelf of everyone who has lived in, studied, or empathized with post-1949 China."
