= Simon Leys =

Belgian-Australian writer, sinologist and essayist (1935–2014)

- Born: Pierre Ryckmans; 28 September 1935; Brussels, Belgium
- Died: 11 August 2014 (aged 78); Sydney, New South Wales, Australia
- Education: Catholic University of Leuven (1834–1968)
- Occupations: Professor, writer, literary critic, translator
- Spouse: Han Fang (Francis) Ryckmans (nee Chang)
- Writing career
- Notable awards: Prix Renaudot, Prix mondial Cino Del Duca, Prix Guizot-Calvados, Christina Stead Prize

Pierre Ryckmans (28 September 1935 – 11 August 2014), better known by his pen name Simon Leys, was a Belgian-Australian sinologist and translator. He lived in Australia from 1970. His work focused on the politics and traditional culture of China, calligraphy, French and English literature, the commercialization of universities, and nautical fiction. His trilogy Les Habits neufs du président Mao (1971), Ombres chinoises (1974) and Images brisées (1976) denounced the Cultural Revolution in China and the idolizing of Mao in the West.

== Early life and education ==
Pierre Ryckmans was born in Uccle, an upper-middle-class district of Brussels, to a prominent Belgian family living in a house on Avenue des Aubépines. He was the son of a publisher, the grandson of Alfonse Ryckmans, an Antwerp alderman and vice president of the Senate, the nephew of Pierre Ryckmans, a governor general of the Belgian Congo, and Gonzague Ryckmans, a professor at the Université catholique de Louvain and a recognized expert of Arabic epigraphy.

He attended the Servites de Marie primary school near his home, then studied Greek and Latin humanities at the Cardinal Mercier diocesan school in Braine-l'Alleud. There, one of his teachers, abbé Voussure, "finished ingraining in him an unwavering Christian faith." From 1953 he studied law and art history at the Université catholique de Louvain.

== Career ==
In 1955, his father died prematurely. In May, as one of ten young Belgians invited to spend a month in China, he took part in a conversation with Premier Zhou Enlai. The experience made him sympathetic to the Maoist regime: "I confidently extended to the Maoist regime the same sympathy that I felt for all things Chinese." The trip convinced him that "it would be inconceivable to live in this world, in our age, without a good knowledge of Chinese language and a direct access to Chinese culture". Upon his return to Belgium, he finished his studies in art history and set out to learn calligraphy.

In the summer of 1958, he travelled to Étel, a port in French Brittany, to board one of the last remaining tuna boats. The account he wrote of the fishing expedition was not published until 45 years later, under the title Prosper.

After being awarded a small bursary from the Nationalist government in Taiwan, he enrolled at the Fine Arts department of National Taiwan University in Taipei. There he studied under the guidance of Puru, a Manchu and cousin of Puyi, the last emperor, and began research for his future PhD dissertation on Shitao, a Chinese painter in the Qing empire.

After completing his studies in Taiwan in 1960, he was called up for military service in Belgium. Instead, he chose to become a conscientious objector and perform civil service in the field of development cooperation for the next three years. First, thanks to the intervention of Eurasian writer Han Suyin, he was able to take up a part-time student and teaching job at Nanyang University in Singapore. However, in 1963, under suspicion of being a communist by the Lee Kuan Yew regime, he had to pack up and leave for Hong Kong, at the time a British colony.

For two years he taught at the New Asia College, one of the colleges of the Chinese University of Hong Kong. He lived in a Kowloon squatter area, sharing with three friends a small accommodation they dubbed Wu Yong Tang (《無用堂》the "hall of uselessness") and living a life redolent of an Eastern Scènes de la vie de bohème.

He supplemented his income by writing summaries of articles from the mainland Chinese press and collecting testimonies from refugees from the mainland on behalf of the Belgian diplomatic delegation. He also gleaned information from China News Analysis, a weekly publication produced in Hong Kong by the Jesuit scholar Father László Ladány. These reports would become the basis of his 1971 book Les Habits neufs du président Mao (translated as The Chairman's New Clothes).

He also taught courses at the local Alliance française. In 1964, he married Han Fang Chang, a journalist he met in Taiwan, and became the father of twins in 1967.

While in Hong Kong, Ryckmans was introduced to French sinologist René Viénet, then a member of the Situationist International, by another sinologist, Jacques Pimpaneau, whom he had met at the New Asian College. René Viénet, who took the view that Chinese press reports on the Cultural Revolution were less sanitized than the writings of Western journalists and sinologists, obtained Pierre Ryckmans's agreement for his essay Les Habits neufs du président Mao to be published in Paris by Champ Libre, a publishing house run by Gérard Lebovici.

For his PhD thesis, Ryckmans chose to translate and comment on a masterpiece of the history of Chinese art, the treatise on painting by Shitao. It was published in 1970 by the Institut Belge des Hautes Etudes Chinoises in Brussels, under the title Propos sur la peinture du moine Citrouille-amère de Shitao. Contribution à l'étude terminologique des théories chinoises de la peinture.

On his publisher's advice, he decided to assume a pen name to avoid being declared persona non grata in the People's Republic of China. He chose "Simon" as his first name, a reference to the original name of the Apostle Peter, and "Leys" as his second name, a tribute to the main character of Victor Segalen's René Leys published in 1922, in which a Belgian teenager residing in Peking in the final days of the Qing Dynasty entertains his employer with accounts of the intrigues and conspiracies taking place behind the walls of the imperial palace. It is also suggested that his nom de plume is an allusion to a dynasty of painters from Antwerp under the name of Leys, with Henri Leys as its most famous representative.

In 1970 Ryckmans settled in Australia and he taught Chinese literature at the Australian National University in Canberra, where he supervised the honours thesis of future Australian Prime Minister Kevin Rudd.

He returned to China in 1972 for six months as a cultural attaché for the Belgian Embassy in Beijing.

In 1983 Ryckmans appeared on the literary talk show Apostrophes on French television. The host, Bernard Pivot, had also invited Maria-Antonietta Macciocchi, a "China expert" and author of the book Dalla Cina. After the latter had waxed lyrical on the subject of the New China, Ryckmans responded ferociously, pointing out errors of fact that suggested she had not verified her sources before writing her book, a work that he judged as being "d'une stupidité totale" (totally stupid) or "une escroquerie" (a fraud).

In the period 1987–93, he was Professor of Chinese Studies at the University of Sydney. He took early retirement, later explaining that, near the end, "deep modifications" had begun to affect universities in Australia and worldwide, "transformations ... progressively taking the university further away from the model to which I had originally devoted my life".

== Later life and death ==
Following his retirement he returned to Canberra, where he lived for the remainder of his life.

He died of cancer in Sydney at the age of 78, in August 2014, surrounded by his wife and four children, Etienne, Jeanne, Louis and Marc.

== Works ==
Ryckmans wrote in French, English and Chinese.

His books on the Chinese Cultural Revolution and on Maoist China – beginning with his trilogy Les Habits neufs du président Mao (1971), Ombres chinoises (1974) and Images brisées (1976) – gave scathing descriptions of the cultural and political destruction in mainland China while denouncing the hypocrisy of its western defenders.

In 1971, on the advice of his publisher, he decided to adopt a pseudonym before the release of Les habits neufs du président Mao, in order to avoid the risk of becoming a persona non grata in the People's Republic of China. He chose "Leys" after the main character of Victor Segalen's novel René Leys (published in 1922).

During the 1970s these books by Ryckmans provoked intense hostility among many Western intellectuals, particularly the French Maoists associated with the journal Tel Quel (such as Philippe Sollers) and attracted attacks from daily newspapers such as Le Monde. However, he was defended by some intellectuals such as Jean-François Revel and Étiemble.

In 1996 he delivered the Boyer Lectures on the theme "Aspects of Culture", in which he argued the need to cultivate the gardens of the mind and which were later published as The View from the Bridge: Aspects of Culture (1996).

Ryckmans was also a translator of Chinese literature, such as the Analects of Confucius and The Treatise on Painting by Shitao. His translation of The Analects of Confucius (1997) sought to introduce readers to "the real, living Confucius" rather than the official Confucian cult portraying him as "always proper, a bit pompous, slightly boring" — and appropriated by authoritarians.

The 2001 film The Emperor's New Clothes, directed by Alan Taylor, was based on Leys' novel The Death of Napoleon. Leys expressed distaste for the film, however; stating in an afterword accompanying a reprint of the novel that this "latter avatar [The Emperor's New Clothes], by the way, was both sad and funny: sad, because Napoleon was interpreted to perfection by an actor (Ian Holm) whose performance made me dream of what could have been achieved had the producer and director bothered to read the book."

His collection of essays, The Hall of Uselessness (2011), revealed the scope of his eccentric interests, wit and insights.

His translation (2013) of Simone Weil’s 1940 essay On the Abolition of All Political Parties was inspired, he said, by the "toxic atmosphere" that had started to pollute Australian politics.

He wrote regularly for the English-language press — The New York Review of Books, The Times Literary Supplement, Quadrant, and The Monthly — and for the French-language press — L'Express, Le Point, Le Monde, Le Figaro littéraire, and Le Magazine Littéraire.

He was a fellow of the Australian Academy of the Humanities, an Honorary Commander of the French Navy and member of the Académie royale de langue et de littérature françaises de Belgique.

He received many awards including the Académie française's Prix Jean Walter, prix d’histoire et de sociologie, the Prix Renaudot de l'essai, the Prix Henri Gal, the Prix Femina, the Prix mondial Cino Del Duca, the Prix Guizot-Calvados, the Prix Quinquernal de Literature, and the Christina Stead Prize for fiction.

=== Bibliography ===
- Shen Fu, Six récits au fil inconstant des jours (Brussels: Maison Ferdinand Larcier, 1966) - translation from Chinese to French by Pierre Ryckmans, with a preface by Yves Hervouet
- Shitao, Les propos sur la peinture du moine Citrouille-amère (Brussels: Institut Belge des Hautes Études Chinoises, 1970) - translation from Chinese to French and commentary by Pierre Ryckmans
- Kouo Mo-jo (Guo Moruo), Autobiographie: mes années d'enfance (Paris: Gallimard, 1970, Collection "Connaissance de l'Orient") - translation from Chinese to French by Pierre Ryckmans
- La Vie et l’œuvre de Su Renshan, rebelle, peintre, et fou, 1814-1849? (Paris and Hong Kong: Centre de publication de l'U.E.R. Extrême-Orient-Asie du Sud-Est de l'Université de Paris, 1971. 2 volumes).
- Les habits neufs du président Mao: chronique de la "Révolution culturelle" (Paris: Champ libre, 1971)
  - The Chairman's New Clothes: Mao and the Cultural Revolution (London: Allison & Busby, 1979; New York: St. Martin's Press, 1977)
- Ombres chinoises: essai (Paris: Union Générale d'Edition, coll. «10-18», 1974)
  - Chinese Shadows (New York: Viking Press, 1977)
- Lu Xun, La mauvaise herbe (Paris: 10/18, 1975) – translation from Chinese to French and commentary by Pierre Ryckmans
- Images brisées (Paris: Robert Laffont, 1976)
  - Broken Images: Essays on Chinese Culture and Politics (London: Allison & Busby, 1979; New York: St. Martin's Press, 1980)
- Human Rights in China (United Daily Newspaper, 1979)
- La Forêt en feu: Essais sur la culture et la politique chinoises (Paris: Hermann, 1983)
  - The Burning Forest: Essays on Chinese Culture and Politics (New York: Holt, Rinehart and Winston, 1985)
- Yao Ming-le, Enquête sur la mort de Lin Biao. Preface by Simon Leys. (Paris: Robert Laffont, 1983)
- Orwell, ou l'horreur de la politique (Paris: Hermann, 1984; Plon, 2006)
- La Mort de Napoléon (Paris: Herrmann, 1986)
  - The Death of Napoleon (London: Quartet Books, 1991; Sydney: Allen & Unwin Australia, 1991)
- "The Chinese Attitude Towards the Past" (presented as the Forty-seventh Morrison Lecture, 16 July 1986; republished in China Heritage Quarterly, No. 14, June 2008)
- Confucius, Les Entretiens de Confucius (Paris: Gallimard, 1987) – translation from Chinese to French, notes and commentary by Pierre Ryckmans
- Richard Henry Dana Jr., Deux années sur le gaillard d'avant (Paris: Éditions Robert Laffont, 1990) – translation from English to French and commentary by Pierre Ryckmans
- L'humeur, l'honneur, l'horreur: Essais sur la culture et la politique chinoises (Paris: Robert Laffont, 1991)
- Aspects of Culture (Boyer Lectures, 1996): Lecture 1, "Introduction; Learning"; Lecture 2, "Reading"; Lecture 3, "Writing"; Lecture 4, "Going Abroad and Staying Home".
- The View from the Bridge: Aspects of Culture (Sydney: ABC Books for the Australian Broadcasting Corporation, 1996)
- Confucius, The Analects of Confucius (New York/London: W. W. Norton & Co., 1997) – translation from Chinese to English and commentary by Pierre Ryckmans
- Essais sur la Chine (Paris: Laffont, 1998, Collection "Bouquins")
- L'Ange et le Cachalot (Paris: Seuil, 1998)
- The Angel and the Octopus: Collected Essays, 1983–1998 (Sydney: Duffy and Snellgrove, 1999)
- Protée et autres essais (Paris: Gallimard, 2001) – awarded the 2001 Prix Renaudot de l'Essai
- La Mer dans la littérature française: de François Rabelais à Pierre Loti (Paris: Plon, 2003. 2 volumes.)
- Les Naufragés du Batavia, suivi de Prosper (Paris: Arléa, 2003) – awarded the 2004 Prix Guizot-Calvados
  - The Wreck of the Batavia: A True Story (Melbourne: Black Inc., 2005)
- Les Idées des autres, idiosyncratiquement compilées pour l'amusement des lecteurs oisifs (Paris, Plon: 2005)
- Other People's Thoughts: Idiosyncratically compiled by Simon Leys for the amusement of idle readers (Melbourne: Black Inc., 2007)
- The Hall of Uselessness: Collected Essays (Melbourne: Black Inc., 2011)
- Le Studio de l'inutilité (Paris: Flammarion, 2012)
- Simone Weil, On the Abolition of All Political Parties (Melbourne: Black Inc., 2013) – translation from French to English by Pierre Ryckmans

For a more comprehensive list of his publications in various languages and editions, see WorldCat for Pierre Ryckmans and Simon Leys; see also this list of articles by Simon Leys in The New York Review of Books.

== See also ==
- Chinese Shadows
- Claude Cadart, French sinologist and early critic of Mao's campaigns
