= Yongle era =

Period of Chinese history (1403–1424)

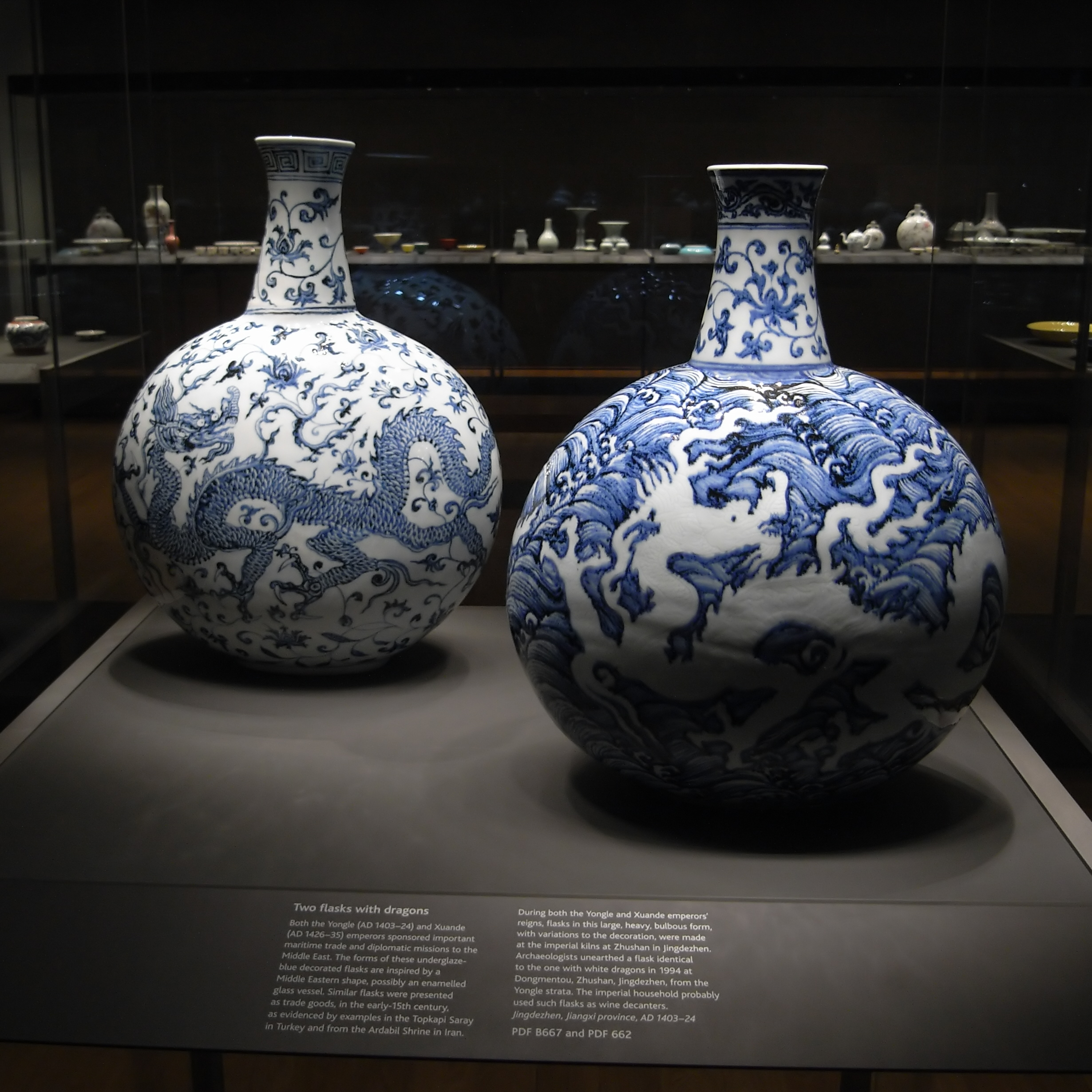
Porcelain wares from the Yongle era, from the collections of the British Museum

The Yongle era (Note: Simplified Chinese: 永乐; traditional Chinese: 永樂; pinyin: Yǒnglè) was the period in Chinese history corresponding to the reign of the Yongle Emperor of the Ming dynasty, spanning from 1403 to 1424. It was preceded by the Jianwen era and was succeeded by the Hongxi era.

The Yongle era was a significant period in the history of the Ming dynasty, marked by political reorganization and expansion. One of its most notable changes was the relocation of the imperial capital from Nanjing to Beijing, which had a major impact on the administration and strategic center of the empire. The construction of Beijing as the new capital, including the development of palaces and infrastructure, reflected the growing concentration of state power in northern China and established a political framework that lasted throughout the dynasty.

Economically, the period experienced both growth and strain. The state worked to stabilize regions damaged by civil war, leading to an increase in agricultural and textile production. However, the era was also characterized by high fiscal demands, as large-scale construction, military activities, and state-sponsored expeditions put pressure on government finances. This resulted in chronic monetary instability, with overuse of paper currency causing inflation and a decline in public confidence, leading to a shift towards silver and copper as mediums of exchange.

In terms of culture, military, and diplomacy, the Yongle era was defined by the state's ambitious and outward-looking approach. There were significant efforts to compile and preserve knowledge through large scholarly projects, while military policies focused on securing the frontier and projecting power beyond China's borders. The Ming state's expanding diplomatic contacts and maritime activities further solidified its position as a dominant force in East and Southeast Asia.

== Background ==
The Yongle Emperor, the third emperor of China's Ming dynasty, was the fourth son of the Hongwu Emperor, the founder of the dynasty. In 1398, the Hongwu Emperor died, and his grandson Zhu Yunwen succeeded to the throne, adopted Jianwen as his era name, and became known as the Jianwen Emperor. After a four-year civil war, the Yongle Emperor usurped the throne in 1402. He did not recognize his predecessor's reign and instead continued the Hongwu era through 1402. The following year, the Yongle era, meaning "Perpetual Happiness", officially began. It was not until 1595 that the Jianwen era was restored to the dynasty's official history by the Wanli Emperor. In August 1424, the Yongle Emperor died while returning from his campaign against the Mongols. He was succeeded by his eldest son Zhu Gaochi, who proclaimed 1425 as the first year of the Hongxi era.

== The new capital ==
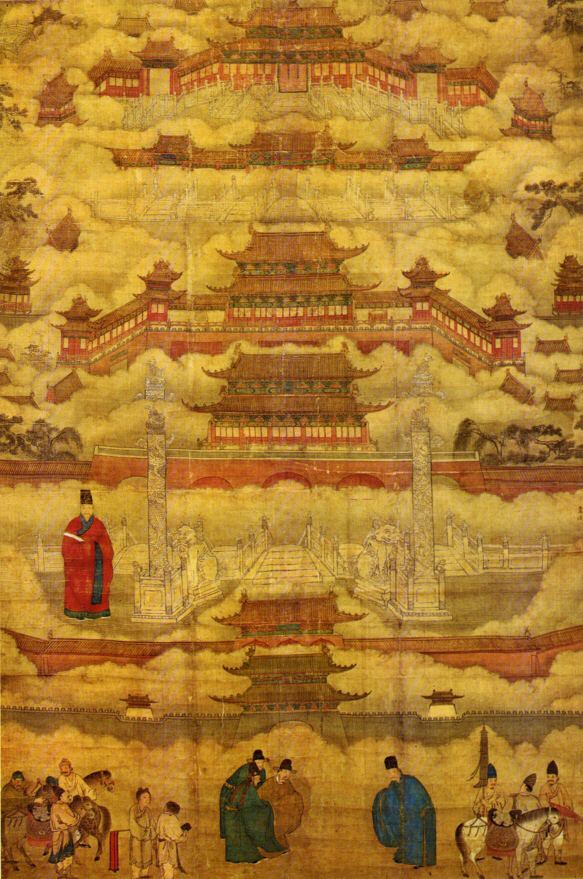
The Forbidden City in Beijing, as depicted in a Ming dynasty painting. The Forbidden City, a 72-hectare complex of palaces and buildings, served as the imperial residence of the Ming emperors from 1420 onward. The current buildings of the palace complex are the result of restorations during the Qing dynasty, which did not significantly alter the appearance of the Ming constructions.

The most significant event of the Yongle era was the relocation of the capital from Nanjing (Southern Capital; then officially known as Yingtian) (Note: During the Ming dynasty, Nanjing was known as Yingtian, while Nanjing (unofficially Nanzhili) referred to the metropolitan area governed by Nanjing authorities since 1421. This area encompassed the present-day Anhui and Jiangsu provinces.) to Beijing (Northern Capital), which had been known as Beiping (Pacified North) until 1403. The idea of moving the capital from Nanjing to the north was first considered by the Hongwu Emperor in the early 1390s. Despite Nanjing's proximity to the empire's economic center in the Yangtze Delta, both the Hongwu and Yongle emperors faced the challenge of governing the empire's northern and western borders from a great distance, which required a significant amount of attention. Additionally, the Yongle Emperor likely regarded Beijing as the center of his personal power, whereas he remained something of an outsider in Nanjing. Beijing was strategically located on the northern border, accessible by the Grand Canal and in close proximity to the sea, making it a convenient location for supplies. Its history as the capital of the Liao, Jin, and Yuan dynasties also added to its significance.

The relocation of the capital was a demanding undertaking that required the large-scale mobilization of people and resources from across the empire. In February 1403, the Emperor initiated the move by designating Beijing as a secondary capital. The city was formally renamed Shuntian (Obedient to Heaven), but it continued to be commonly known as Beijing. He appointed his eldest son, Zhu Gaochi, to administer the city and province and established branches of central ministries and chief military commissions there. In 1404, 10,000 families from Shanxi were relocated to the city, and Beijing and its surrounding areas were granted a two-year tax exemption. The following year, more than 120,000 landless households from the Yangtze Delta were moved north, and construction of government buildings began. Timber was harvested from forests in Jiangxi, Huguang, Zhejiang, Shanxi, and Sichuan to supply the palaces in Beijing. Although artisans and laborers were dispatched from across the empire, construction progressed slowly due to supply constraints.

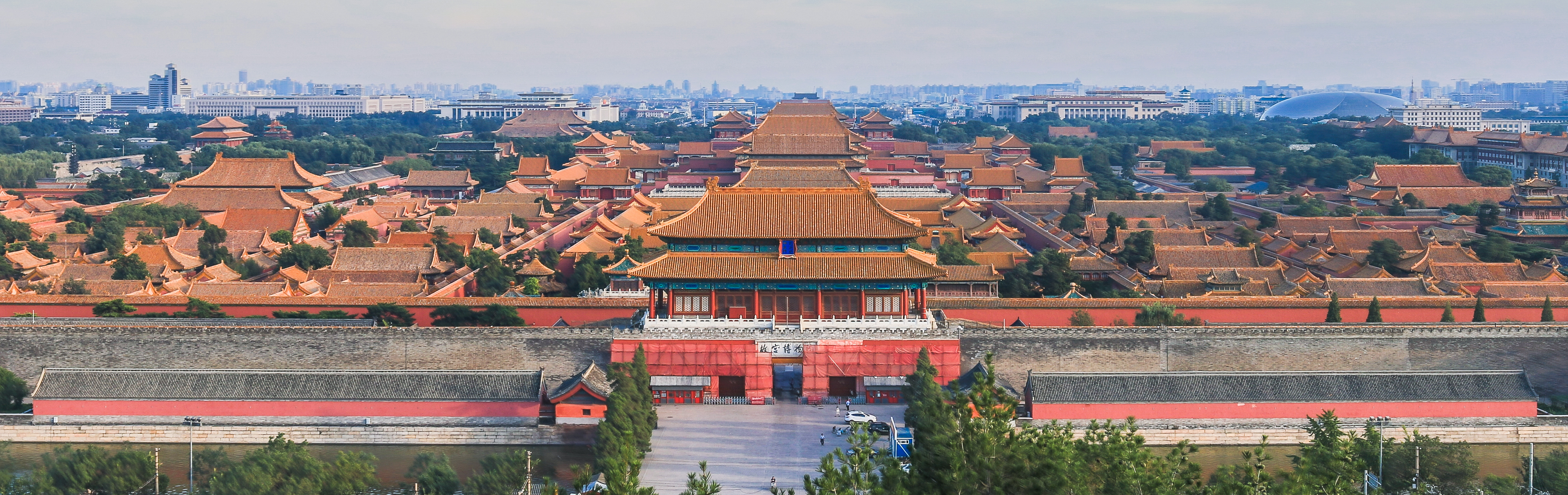
Panorama of the Forbidden City in Beijing

In March 1409, the Emperor arrived in the north for the first time in seven years, following the end of the first Mongol campaign. When he returned to Nanjing the following year, officials criticized the excessive expenditure on construction in Beijing, leading to reduced spending and a slowdown in construction that lasted several years. From 1414 to the end of 1416, the Emperor remained in Beijing during the campaign in Mongolia. The reconstruction of the Grand Canal was completed in 1415, which greatly aided in the supply of the north. Construction then resumed at a faster pace. The exact number of workers involved in building the city is unknown, but it is estimated to have been several hundred thousand. (Note: According to American historian Patricia Ebrey, hundreds of thousands of workers were involved in the construction of Beijing. Historian Ray Huang estimates that there were 100,000 artisans and 1 million laborers involved in the project.) The chief architects and engineers include Cai Xin (蔡信), Nguyễn An (a Viet eunuch), Kuai Xiang and Lu Xiang (陸祥). By the end of 1417, most of the palaces were completed, but construction on the walls continued. In 1420, the city was deemed ready for the relocation of the government. On 28 October 1420, Beijing was officially declared the principal capital of the empire, and by February 1421, ministries and other government agencies had relocated to Beijing. The Beijing authorities administered the empire from 1421. Some ministries remained in Nanjing, but their powers were limited to the southern metropolitan area and held little political significance. The cost of supplying Beijing, which was located far from the economically developed regions of the country, was a constant burden on the state treasury.

In 1421, a famine broke out in the northern provinces. At the same time, three major audience halls in the newly built Forbidden City were destroyed by fire. The Emperor regarded the event as a sign of Heaven's displeasure. He called upon government officials to critique the mistakes of the government. A junior secretary named Xiao Yi strongly criticized the decision to build the capital in the north and was subsequently executed. This effectively silenced any further discussion on the matter.

== Reconstruction of the Grand Canal ==
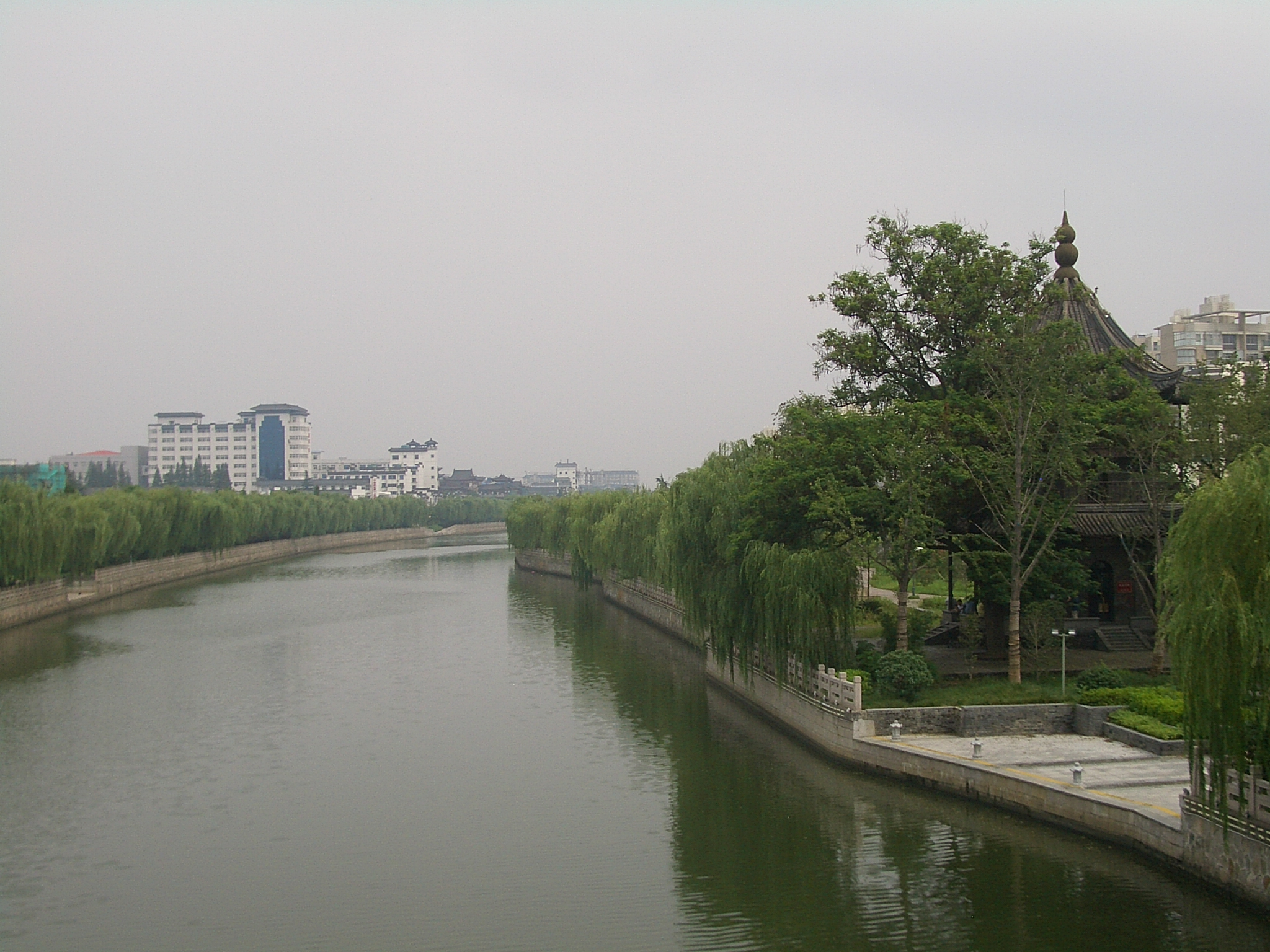
The Grand Canal in Yangzhou, located east of the city's historic center

In the centuries before the Yongle era, the Grand Canal had fallen into disrepair and was partly unusable. (Note: During the Yuan dynasty, rice was supplied to Beijing from the south via sea routes.) Early in the Yongle era, rice supplies to Beijing and the northern armies relied on two routes. One ran from Liujiagang in the Yangtze Delta through the East China Sea to Tianjin, but this sea route was dangerous because of storms and piracy. The other passed through inland rivers and canals in Anhui, Shandong, and Hubei, but required multiple transfers of cargo. Annually, 480,000 to 800,000 dan of rice were shipped by sea, while inland routes carried even more, with a total of 2 to 2.5 million dan delivered to the north between 1410 and 1414. This inefficient system placed a heavy burden on the population. The Emperor approved a petition from officials in Shandong for the restoration of a continuous north–south waterway. The government mobilized 165,000 workers to rebuild the canal and constructed fifteen locks in western Shandong. After completion in 1415, transport became faster and cheaper. Rice shipments rose to 5 million dan in 1417 and 4.7 million in 1418, before later stabilizing at 2–3 million annually. Transport was handled by 160,000 soldiers using 15,000 ships, while 47,000 workers maintained the canal. The reopening of the Grand Canal stimulated economic growth along its route, (Note: Northern Nanzhili, Henan and Shandong.) but also ended sea transport of grain to the north, contributing to a decline in naval shipbuilding. (Note: Later, officials opposed the resumption of rice transportation by sea in order to prevent the development of the naval fleet.)

The reopening of the Grand Canal had a positive impact on Suzhou. Its strategic location in the middle of the canal network south of the Yangtze (which was reconstructed after 1403) allowed the city to regain its status as a major commercial hub and experience a return to prosperity after being deprived of it during the reign of the Hongwu Emperor. (Note: During the Hongwu era, excessive land taxes were imposed on Jiangnan, particularly Suzhou Prefecture. Although it accounted for only 1.1% of the empire's land, the region was assessed 2.81 million dan of grain in 1393, representing 9.5% of the empire's total tax revenue. This heavy fiscal burden strained the local economy and led to a temporary decline in the city's prosperity under the Hongwu Emperor.) Nanjing's political and economic influence declined, relegating it to a regional center, though it remained the foremost cultural center of the empire.

== Economy ==
=== Population, agriculture, and crafts ===
Around 1400, the Ming dynasty had a population of 90 million. During the early 15th century, the weather was more stable and warmer compared to before and after. This favorable climate allowed for rich harvests, making agriculture the foundation of the country's prosperity. Although there were occasional local disasters such as epidemics or floods, they did not significantly alter the overall situation. The government provided assistance to affected regions from state reserves.

The Yongle Emperor recognized that supporting the peasants was the most effective way to secure the throne for his descendants. In 1403, when the crops were destroyed by a locust invasion in Henan, he took the initiative to organize relief efforts for the affected population. He also punished negligent officials and rejected the suggestion of Minister of Revenue Yu Xin (郁新) to punish officials who were unable to collect taxes in full. The Emperor argued that the root of the problem was the natural disaster, not the officials. In 1404, when he was informed of the increase in silk production in Shandong, he responded that he would not be satisfied until there was enough food and clothing for everyone in the empire, ensuring that no one suffered from hunger or cold.

The northern provinces were impoverished and unproductive, and their local army and administration had become reliant on importing rice from the south during the Hongwu era. The relocation of the capital to Beijing resulted in an increase in the number of soldiers, officials, artisans, and laborers, exacerbating the issue. The government attempted to resettle people from the densely populated south to the north, but the southerners struggled to adapt to the harsh northern climate and many returned to their homes. By 1416, the government had abandoned this forced resettlement policy and instead implemented a strategy of supporting local development. As part of this, the government began selling salt trading licenses to merchants in exchange for rice deliveries to the north. (Note: These merchants also supplied rice to armies in the southwest and Đại Việt (present-day northern Vietnam).) On the other hand, the influx of impoverished immigrants from other parts of north China resulted in an increase in cultivated land and the production of agricultural and textile goods. This also led to the establishment of foundries in Zunhua in Hebei.

=== Finance and currency ===
The Yongle Emperor was less frugal than his father, as his reign involved extensive spending on foreign expansion, including campaigns in Đại Việt (present-day northern Vietnam) and Mongolia and major naval expeditions, as well as on internal projects such as the construction of a new capital and the restoration of the Grand Canal. State expenditure doubled or tripled from the Hongwu era, though its exact scale is difficult to determine due to the absence of an official budget and the earmarking of revenues for specific expenses. Efforts to raise revenue through paper money issuance and increased grain levies on hereditary soldiers proved insufficient. Although taxes were reduced in some regions, the state met its needs through requisitions and expanded labor obligations. Consequently, state reserves, normally equivalent to one year’s income during the Ming, fell to a record low during the Yongle era.

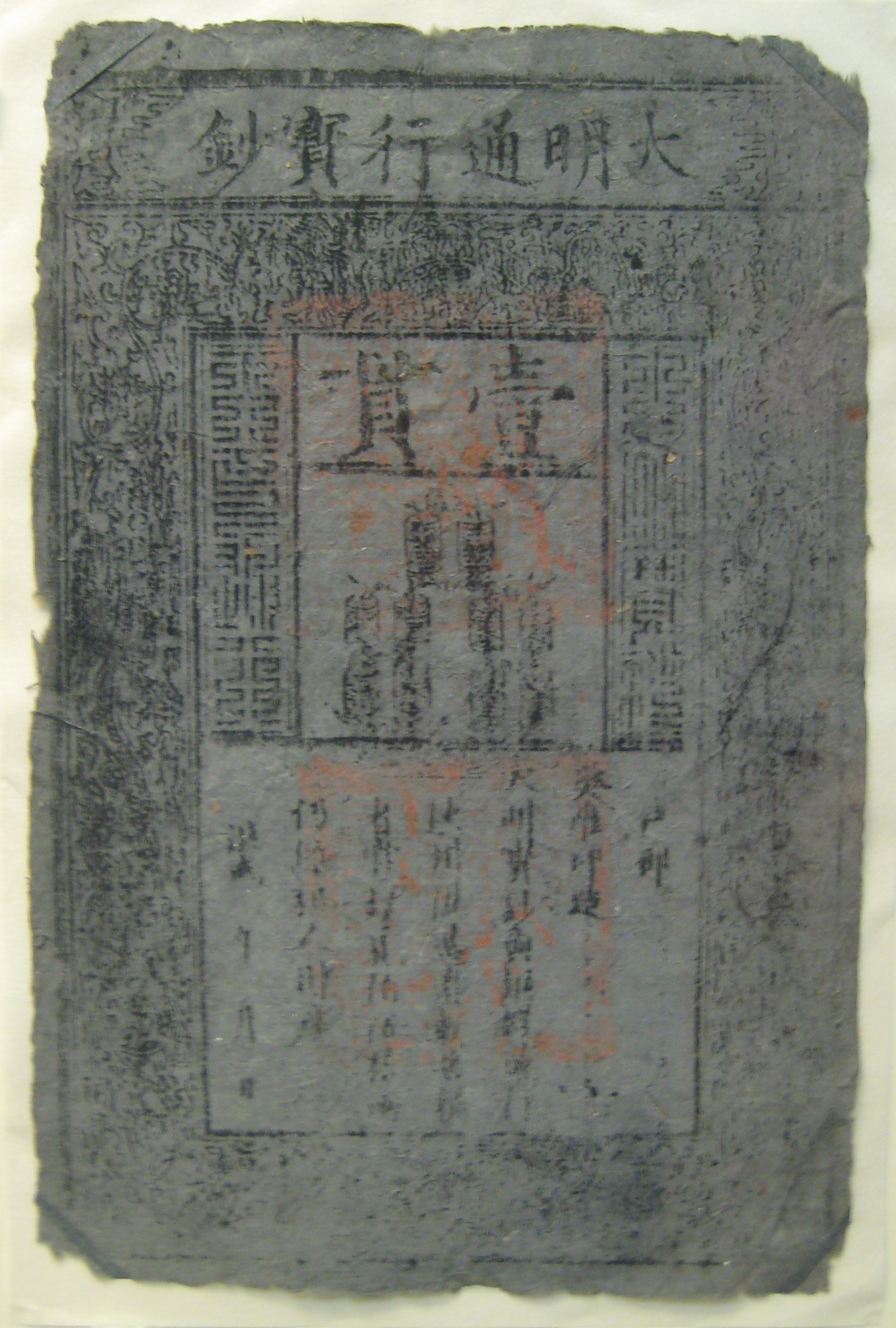
A Ming dynasty banknote

The economic growth was supported by the government's expansion of precious metal mining, particularly copper and silver, in southern China and Đại Việt. The government also increased the emission of paper money (banknotes, baochao). Revenues from silver mining, which previously accounted for only 30% of output, rose significantly from 1.1 tons in 1390 to over 10 tons in 1409, and remained at this level for the rest of the Yongle era. The government produced coins from the mined copper, which were stored in state treasuries and given as gifts to foreign embassies, but these coins continued to circulate on the domestic market alongside the baochao, in contrast to the Xuande and Zhengtong eras (1425–1447) when they were removed from circulation under government pressure.

Like his father, the Yongle Emperor believed that banknotes were the foundation of currency. In order to cover the deficit caused by expensive foreign policies and the relocation of the capital, he printed large volumes of these banknotes, but this excessive printing led to inflation, the most severe in the Ming period. By 1425, paper money was only worth 2% of its nominal value, causing the population to reject it. In an attempt to encourage its circulation, the government required fees to be paid with these banknotes, but this had little impact. Additionally, the repeated bans on the use of silver in commercial transactions (in 1403, 1404, 1419, and 1425) were also unsuccessful.

Officials and title holders were no longer solely compensated with grain, as the Hongwu Emperor's rules had originally intended. Instead, senior officials received 60% of their salary in grain, while lower officials received a mere 20%. The remainder was paid in bills and coins. However, this method of payment using devalued banknotes resulted in a significant decrease in the already low salaries of these officials, leading many officials and officers to seek illegal sources of income.

The Yongle Emperor sought to increase income from military farms (juntun; 軍屯), but the northern borderlands, home to most of the military units, were largely barren. In order to make up for the lack of resources, officers resorted to becoming landowners and using the labor of their soldiers, leading to desertion among the ranks. Despite the government's efforts to control and increase production, the hereditary soldiers consistently delivered less each year. For example, their production dropped from 23 million dan of grain in 1403 to 14 million in 1407 and eventually to 5 million in 1423.

=== Taxation and levies ===
During the Yongle era, the amount of land tax collected was significantly higher than in previous decades, with a yield of 31–34 million dan of grain. In comparison, the land tax in 1393 was 29.4 million dan. The actual burden of the tax was also influenced by transportation costs and additional fees that were collected to cover them. In some cases, the tax was not collected in grain, but rather in silk and other commodities, based on calculations determined by the state. These calculations often did not reflect the current market prices, resulting in the tax being increased multiple times.

The taxation in Jiangnan remained exceptionally high, with Suzhou and Songjiang prefectures supplying 14% of the empire's land taxes. The residents of Jiangnan were not able to pay these high taxes, leading to a significant amount of arrears in the early 1430s. For example, Suzhou Prefecture alone had 8 million dan of grain in arrears. The Xuande Emperor eventually reduced their taxes.

Part of the materials and labor required for government construction projects were purchased using surpluses from state granaries, but at state-set prices lower than market rates. Rising state demands significantly affected the population, mainly through increasing extraordinary levies and expanded compulsory labor. For example, artisans' work duty, normally 30 days per year, was often extended to periods exceeding a year. Additionally, the cost of importing rice to Beijing was borne by peasants in the Yangtze River Delta, who supplied rice to southern ports before it was shipped north by the army.

To cover these costs, a tax surcharge was imposed, which had to be paid in money. Both sea and inland transport routes were costly and inefficient, but the opening of the Grand Canal in 1415 greatly improved transportation. By 1418, taxpayers themselves had to transport rice all the way to Beijing. In 1431, the government relieved them of this obligation, and soldiers once again took responsibility for grain transport along the Grand Canal. In an effort to reduce the government's demands on its subjects and limit government spending, the Yongle Emperor's successors implemented reforms. Despite these efforts, maintaining a large army and supplying Beijing continued to be a difficult task.

== Culture ==
The Yongle Emperor portrayed himself as a patron of education and a model Confucian leader in order to solidify his legitimacy. He actively promoted traditional education, commissioned the compilation of Confucian classics, and declared Confucianism as the official state ideology. In 1414, he tasked scholars from the Hanlin Academy with creating a comprehensive collection of commentaries on the Four Books and Five Classics by Zhu Xi and other prominent Confucian thinkers of his school. This project was completed by October 1415 and became the official guide for teaching and examinations.

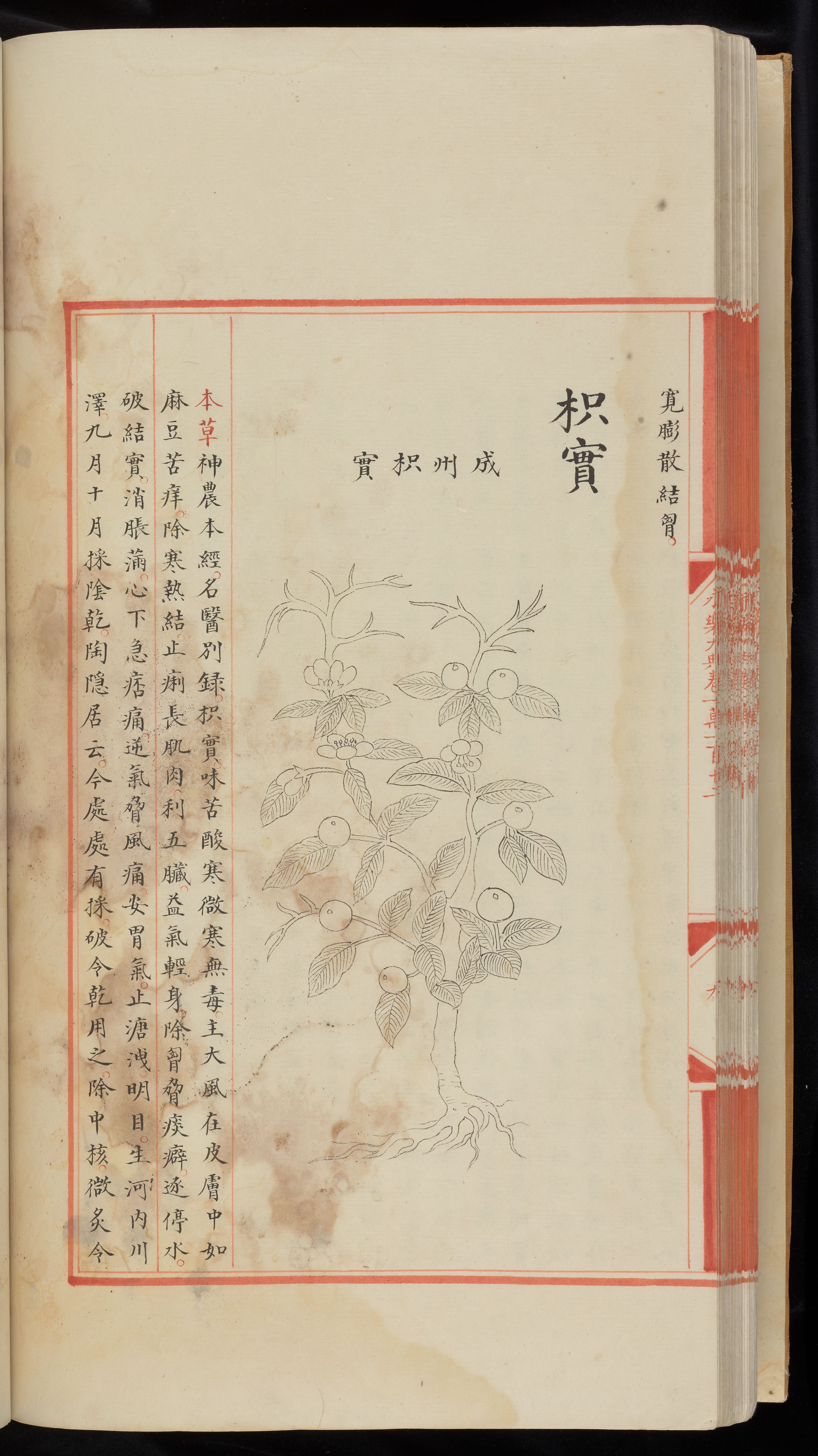
One page of a surviving volume of the Yongle Encyclopedia

The Yongle Encyclopedia was the most significant and extensive collection of encyclopedias during the Yongle era. The Emperor commissioned Grand Secretary Xie Jin to compile a collection that included all known books, either partially or completely. This project involved 2,169 scholars from the Hanlin Academy and the Imperial University and took four years to complete, finishing in December 1407. The scope of the encyclopedia was vast, consisting of 22,277 juan (chapters), with the table of contents alone spanning 60 juan, (Note: According to other sources, the Yongle Encyclopedia consisted of seven thousand volumes, 22,938 juan, and 50 million words.) but it was not published and only a few manuscripts were kept in the imperial libraries. Currently, only 700 juan have survived. This encyclopedia covered a wide range of topics and included materials from all fields of Chinese literature. Its significance lies in its contribution to the preservation of Chinese literature, as it was used by compilers in the 17th century.

The lamas from Tibet impressed the Emperor, and more than two thousand Tibetan monks resided in Beijing. However, his reverence for Buddhism had its boundaries. He only allowed his subjects to become monks to a limited extent, following the Hongwu Emperor's decree that only one man out of forty could do so. On the other hand, he promoted the spread of Buddhism among the non-Chinese peoples of the empire, but with purely political motives—to pacify conflicts and maintain peaceful rule over them.

Artistic production during the Yongle era was primarily characterized by porcelain, lacquerware, and gilded Buddhist bronze sculptures. This development was partly rooted in the legacy of the preceding Mongol Yuan dynasty, which had concentrated large numbers of highly skilled artisans in the capital, many of whom the Yongle Emperor later employed after his arrival in Beijing during his youth as the Prince of Yan. Blue-and-white porcelain, in particular, underwent notable advancements during the Yongle era. Material quality improved substantially, and porcelain evolved from serving mainly the imperial household to becoming a major international trade commodity, with China occupying a monopolistic position. At the same time, cultural exchange with the Timurids in Central Asia introduced Islamic influences into Chinese art. The Emperor's strong interest in calligraphy was reflected in his patronage of the calligraphers Shen Du (沈度; 1357–1434) and Shen Can (沈粲; 1379–1453), whom he commissioned to produce palace editions in the form of large-scale woodblock carvings.

== Military ==
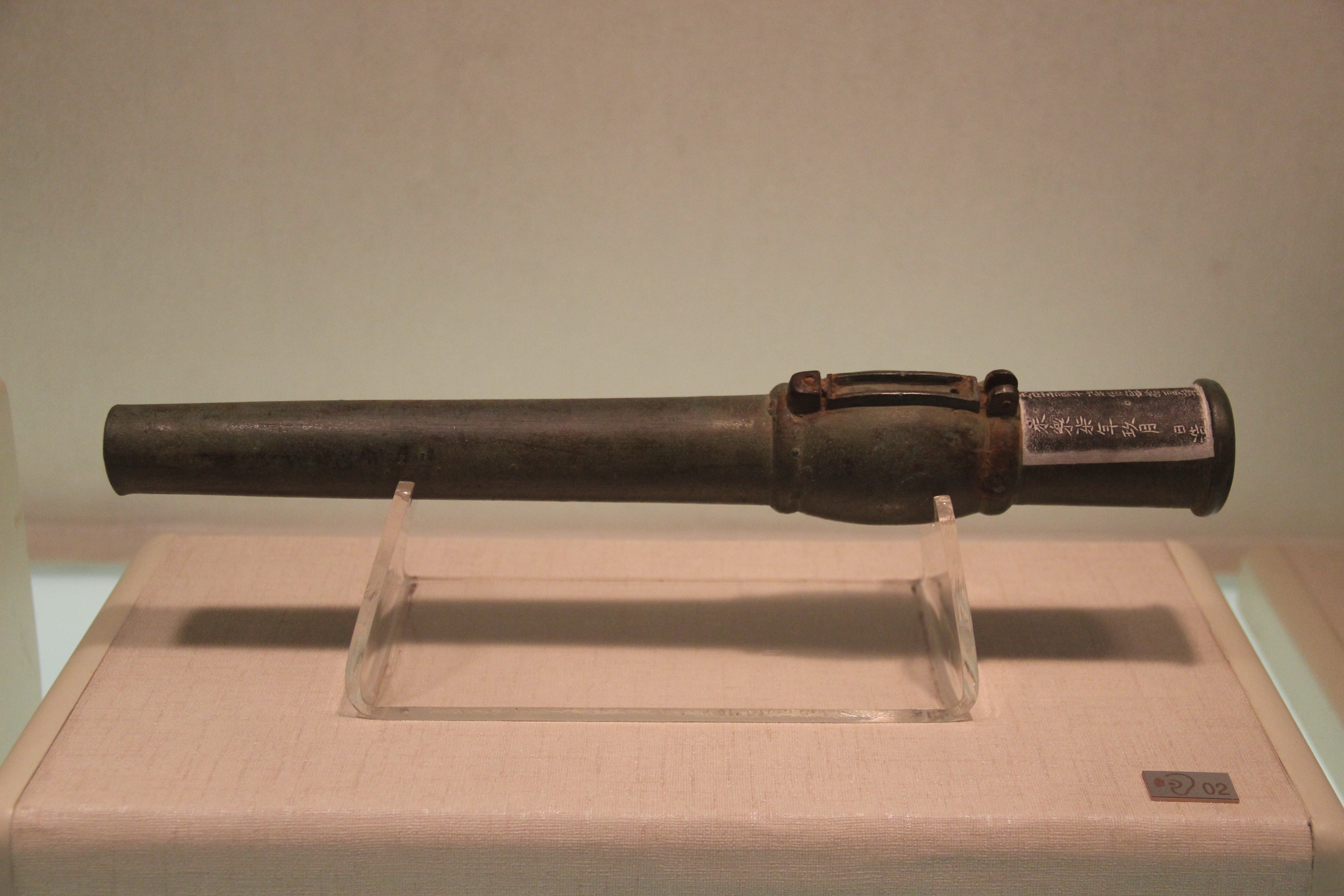
A Ming hand cannon, 1409. Liaoning Museum, Shenyang

During the Yongle era, the military underwent significant changes. The Yongle Emperor implemented four major reforms, including the abolition of the princely guards (huwei; 護衛), the relocation of the majority of the capital guards (jingwei; 京衛) from Nanjing to Beijing, the establishment of the capital training camps (jingying; 京營), and the reorganization of the defenses along the northern border.

The Emperor reorganized the Embroidered Uniform Guard (Jinyiwei), which was responsible for carrying out secret police duties. Its main focus was handling politically sensitive cases, such as investigating members of the imperial family, but there were instances of corruption and abuse of power within the organization, most notably the case of Ji Gang (紀綱). Ji Gang, who had been the Emperor's favorite during the civil war, was eventually accused of plotting against the throne and executed in 1416. By 1420, the Embroidered Uniform Guard had been overshadowed by the Eastern Depot, which also conducted investigations on its officers.

The abolition of the princes' armies was a logical decision. The Yongle Emperor's military strength as the Prince of Yan played a crucial role in his rise to the throne, and he was determined to prevent further princely revolts. The existing princely guards were mostly integrated into the regular army, and although the Yongle Emperor's sons had played an active and successful role in the civil war, they were not given command of the armies after it ended. Instead, the Emperor or his generals led campaigns.

One significant and permanent step taken during this time was the relocation of a large portion of the army to the Beijing area. As the capital moved to Beijing, the majority of the 41 guard units (Note: One guard unit typically consisted of 1,200 soldiers.) of the Nanjing garrison also made the move. Among the troops stationed in Beijing were 22 guard units of the Imperial Guard (qinjun; 親軍), totaling 190,800 men. This included the original three units of the Yongle Emperor's guard from when he was prince. Approximately 25–30% of the Ming army (74 guard units in the mid-1430s) was now concentrated in and around Beijing, with a total strength of over two million men during the Yongle era. Soldiers and their families made up a significant portion of the population in the Beijing area. (Note: In 1393, Beiping province had a population of 1,926,595 inhabitants.) To oversee the remaining guard units in and around Nanjing, a military commander position was established, often filled by eunuchs.

After the second campaign in Mongolia, the Emperor made the decision to enhance the training of his soldiers. He established the capital training camps, known as the Three Great Camps (Sandaying), in the vicinity of Beijing. In 1415, he issued a decree requiring all guards in the northern provinces and the southern metropolitan area to send a portion of their troops to these camps for training. The camps were specifically designed for the training of infantry, cavalry, and units equipped with firearms. Each camp was under the leadership of a eunuch and two generals. The Emperor placed great emphasis on the importance of cavalry in successful combat in the steppe. The number of horses in the army significantly increased from 37,993 in 1403 to 1,585,322 in 1423.

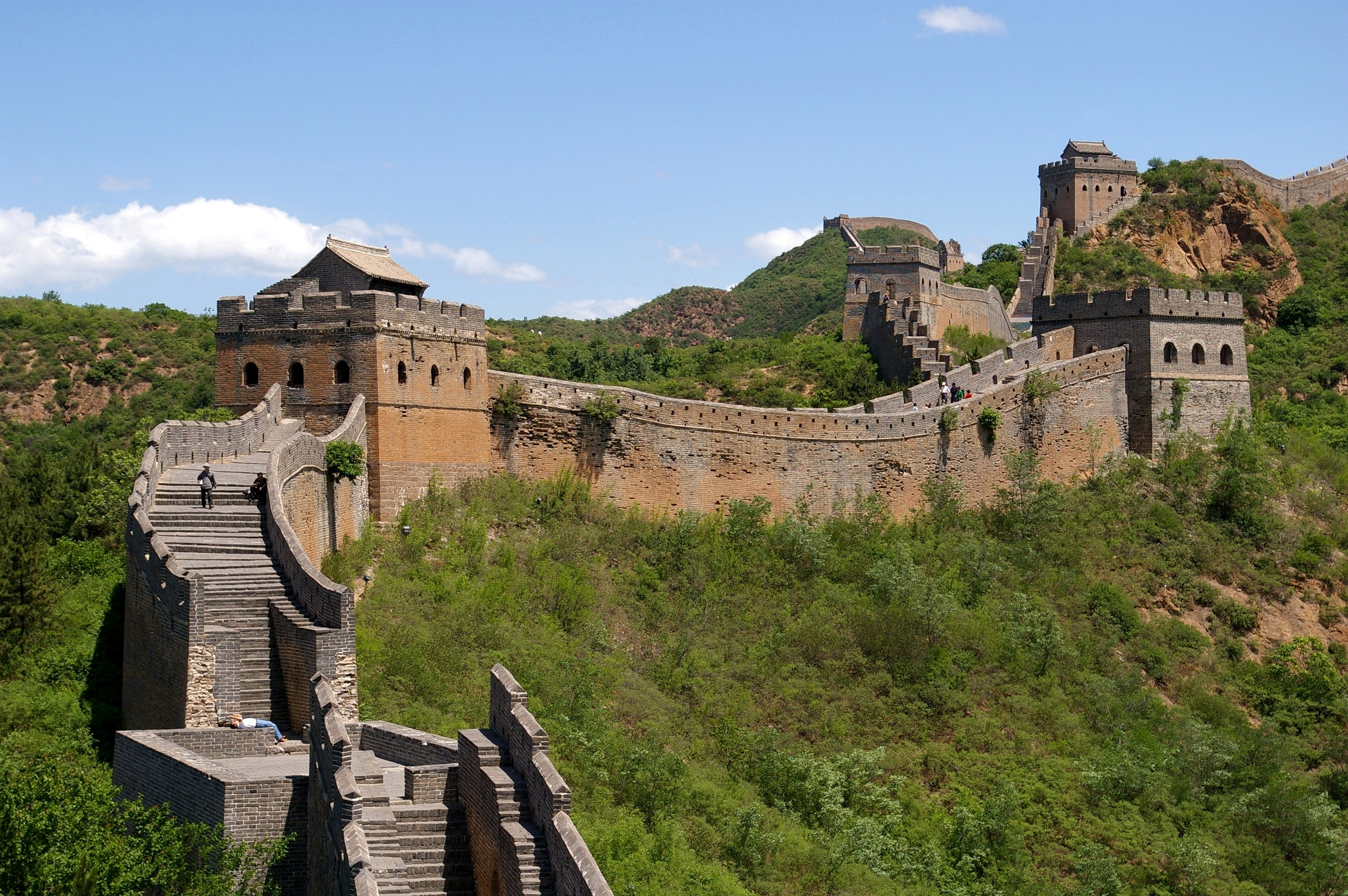
A section of the Great Wall at Jinshanling, Hebei. The watchtowers along the Wall, including those visible in this section, functioned as signalling posts, enabling rapid communication and early warnings of the movements of highly mobile enemies such as the Mongols.

At the beginning of the Yongle era, the defense system on the northern border was reorganized. Under the Hongwu Emperor, the defense of the north was organized in two lines. The first, the outer line, consisted of eight garrisons located in the steppe close to the border. These garrisons served as bases for forays into Mongolian territory. The second line of defense was along the later Great Wall. This strategic placement allowed for the prevention of Mongol raids even in the steppe. In the Yongle era, the outer line was abandoned (Note: Chan Hok-lam in The Cambridge History of China Volume 7 states that the withdrawal occurred due to financial reasons, while Wang Yuan-Kang in Harmony and War: Confucian Culture and Chinese Power Politics writes about the "withdrawal for unclear reasons".) with the exception of the garrison in Kaiping. (Note: The isolated Kaiping was difficult to defend, leading to its abandonment by the Ming army in 1430.) The Emperor then resettled loyal Uriankhai Mongols on the vacated territory.

The border troops along the northern borders were placed under the authority of nine newly established border regional commands. These commands were under the control of provincial military commanders (zongbing guan; 總兵官) and were located in Liaodong, Jizhou, Xuanfu, Datong, Shanxi, Yansui, Guyuan (in Shaanxi), Ningxia, and Gansu. Unlike in the Hongwu era, the soldiers stationed on the border were not from nearby guards, but were instead from the three capital training camps. The commanders of these areas were chosen from officers of the inland garrisons or higher commands. (Note: Later, during the reign of the Xuande Emperor (1425–1435), these commands became more stable and evolved from a temporary structure into a regular part of the army, becoming more professional than the typical inland units.) By the end of the Yongle era, there were 863,000 soldiers stationed in garrisons along the northern border.

The withdrawal to the Great Wall was a significant decline in security, as evidenced by later Ming officials debating the occupation of Ordos. The main fortress of the inner line, Xuanfu, was vulnerable to Mongol attacks after the withdrawal. Under the Yongle Emperor, however, the negative effects of the withdrawal were overshadowed by Ming power and strength. After his death, the Chinese did not make any attempts to reclaim the steppe for the rest of the Ming dynasty.

The navy was not a separate branch of the army; only the coastal guards had ships. By 1420, there were approximately 1,350 small patrol ships and an equal number of large warships scattered among the coastal garrisons. The Nanjing fleet consisted of 400 warships, 400 cargo ships manned by soldiers from Nanjing garrison guards, who were trained for naval combat (four of the ten Nanjing guards had "naval" names), and 250 treasure ships and other ships used for long-distance voyages.

== Foreign relations ==
=== General characteristics ===
During the Yongle era, Ming China was regarded as the strongest, wealthiest, and most populous country in the world. The Yongle and Xuande emperors differed from other Ming rulers because of their active and costly military and diplomatic policies. Their primary objective was to extend Ming influence beyond China's borders. Throughout the Yongle era, envoys were dispatched to many nearby and distant states to secure at least symbolic recognition of the Ming emperor's supremacy. Like his father, the Yongle Emperor sought to conquer Mongolia to resolve northern security threats. To the east and south, the Ming dynasty dominated the seas from Japan to the Strait of Malacca, with Chinese naval forces protecting trade routes in Southeast Asia and regularly reaching the Indian Ocean, a region previously little visited by the Chinese. Beyond Mongolia, Ming missions also traveled to Manchuria in the north and as far west as the Timurid Empire.

To incorporate foreign states into the Ming tributary system, the Emperor employed a combination of military force, diplomacy, trade, and the promotion of Chinese culture. (Note: The Ming tributary system functioned as a carefully balanced exchange of legitimacy for benefits. Foreign rulers sent tribute missions to the Ming court, formally recognizing China's supremacy through ceremonial submissions. In return, the Ming emperor granted them valuable gifts, trade privileges, and political recognition. This system allowed China to maintain diplomatic dominance while strictly controlling foreign trade through official channels. Beyond material exchanges, it served as a powerful vehicle for spreading Chinese cultural and political influence across East Asia.) These missions not only displayed Ming power but also reinforced recognition of the Yongle Emperor's supremacy and brought valuable local products to China. The strength of the Ming dynasty is reflected in the number of Asian rulers who personally traveled to China. Since monarchs rarely left their own realms, such journeys underscored the considerable pressure and influence exerted by the Ming court.

=== Foreign trade ===
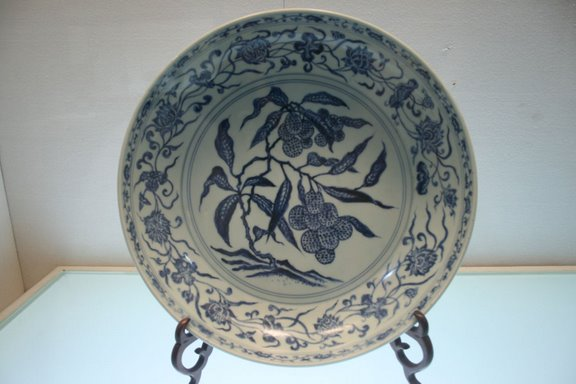
A porcelain plate from the Yongle era in the collections of the Nanjing Museum. Blue-and-white porcelain, characteristic of the early Ming period, was exported throughout Asia.

One of the main reasons the Ming sought to engage in foreign activities during the Yongle era was to revive the declining foreign trade, which had suffered under the isolationist policies of the Hongwu Emperor. Foreign trade was seen as a valuable source of additional income for the imperial treasury, which was necessary given the high government expenditures at the time, but the Ming emperor maintained a monopoly on foreign trade and entrusted it to his personal servants—eunuchs. He also strictly prohibited his subjects from engaging in overseas trade and only allowed foreigners to enter China for tributary missions. The government punished any violation of this state monopoly, known as the Haijin policy, as piracy or smuggling.

During the Yongle era, there was a significant increase in foreign trade. Large quantities of porcelain were exported to traditional markets in East and Southeast Asia, Central Asia, and the Ottoman Empire. The export of silk and silk clothing was even more significant, having a major impact on economies throughout Asia. For example, Bengali textile mills imported Chinese silk for processing and re-export, while Egyptian textile manufacturers suffered from competition from the East.

The revival of trade in East Asia was accompanied by an outflow of copper coins from China to other regions such as Korea, Japan, Southeast Asia, and India. This led to the growth of Malacca and ports in northern Java, which became more important than older trading centers. The influx of Chinese coins also boosted local trade. Chinese copper coins were the standard currency in Brunei, Sumbawa, and the Moluccas until the early 16th century.

China's prosperity also had a positive impact on other regions such as Central and Western Asia, Korea, Japan, Southeast Asia, India, the Middle East, and East Africa. In more distant countries, where silver was the only valuable commodity for trade, its outflow to China's economy became a concern. In the first decades of the 15th century, governments from London to Cairo complained about the outflow of silver to the East.

=== Tibet and Nepal ===
In Tibet, the Hongwu Emperor did not establish contacts with the kings of the Phagmodrupa dynasty, but instead with the Karmapa, who ruled southeastern Tibet (Kham), which was adjacent to China. The first envoy from the Karmapa arrived in Nanjing in late 1372. The 5th Karmapa, Deshin Shekpa, was known for his reputation as a miracle worker and had already caught the Yongle Emperor's attention while he was the Prince of Yan. After ascending the throne, he sent a mission led by the eunuch Hou Xian and the monk Zhiguang (智光) to request a visit from Deshin Shekpa. In 1407, Deshin Shekpa finally arrived in Nanjing, where he won the Emperor's admiration. He took the opportunity to visit Mount Wutai. According to Tibetan records, the Emperor offered to provide an army to help secure Deshin Shekpa's rule over Tibet, but the Karmapa declined. The Karmapas continued to send missions to China until the late 1540s.

After the Karmapa's visit, the Yongle Emperor sent several delegations to other religious leaders in Tibet. These delegations were led by Yang Sanbao (楊三保), who visited multiple monasteries and convinced several princes to pledge their allegiance to the Ming dynasty. Yang traveled as far as Nepal, where delegations from Hou Xian and Deng Cheng also visited. Representatives from the Tibetan Buddhist schools of Sakya and Gelug also journeyed to Nanjing at the invitation of the Ming government. This strategy of maintaining relationships with various religious schools while ignoring the Tibetan kings ultimately contributed to the fragmentation of Tibet, which was likely a deliberate policy.

=== Central Asia ===
In the western regions, the Yongle Emperor sent embassies to various cities and states in Central Asia, ranging from the Chinese border to the Timurid Empire. His goal was to establish his superiority and receive tribute by offering Chinese titles and goods in exchange. This tactic proved successful as local rulers, such as Engke Temür of Hami, accepted the title of king (wang) in 1404. Even the three leaders of the Oirats, who were the dominant Western Mongols in Dzungaria, submitted to Ming demands in 1409. However, not all rulers were as receptive. In Samarkand, the Emperor's embassies were unsuccessful and were executed by Emir Timur, who controlled Central Asia. This was similar to the fate of the Hongwu Emperor's embassies before. Timur then gathered an army of 200,000 in Otrar, with the intention of conquering China. He died in February 1405 before he could carry out his plans. His descendants were preoccupied with internal conflicts and had no interest in waging war against China.

The most significant aspect of the Ming dynasty's relations with Central Asian states was the lucrative trade that existed between them. This trade was so profitable that local states were willing to acknowledge their formal subordination to the Ming emperor. Between 1402 and 1424, a total of 20 missions were sent from the Timurid capitals of Samarkand and Herat, 44 from Hami, 13 from Turpan, and 32 from other Central Asian states. These missions brought tribute to China in the form of precious metals, jade, horses, camels, sheep, and even lions. In return, they received silk and other luxury goods, as well as paper money which they could use to purchase goods in Chinese markets.

In Central Asia, Hami maintained close relations with the Ming government. He sent envoys multiple times a year, but the Ming government attempted to control trade and discourage independent private activities. Trade with Turpan and Oirats occurred with less frequency. The Ming government also opposed the ongoing conflicts between Central Asian states, although their efforts were not always successful. They were unable to influence the internal affairs of these states.

Possible Chinese painting of the white horse offered by the Timurid ruler Shah Rukh to the Yongle Emperor in 1412. This painting, dated 1417, was copied by the Aq Qoyunlu by the end of the century, and archived in the art albums of the Safavids and subsequent dynasties (Topkapi Palace Museum Library H. 2153, folio 150r (left) and Topkapi Palace Museum Library H. 2154, folio 33v (right))

Timur's successors, Khalil Sultan and Shah Rukh, maintained positive relations with the Ming court. The Yongle Emperor even sent his chief experts on foreign affairs, Chen Cheng, Li Xian (李暹), and the eunuch Li Da (李達), to Samarkand and Herat. Furthermore, in his correspondence with Shah Rukh, the Emperor gradually stopped insisting on his subordination, showing a shift towards a more equal relationship. This was likely due to a shared interest in trade, which was prioritized over maintaining prestige.

=== Mongolia ===
The Ming government sought to integrate the Mongols into the tributary trade system, under which they exchanged horses and other livestock for paper money, silver, silk, cloth, and official titles. It also imposed strict limits on the volume of trade. When nomadic groups were unable to obtain sufficient goods through peaceful exchange, they often turned to raiding. Many Mongols also migrated into China and frequently served in the military and other imperial services.

The Mongols were divided into two main groups: the Western (Oirats) and Eastern Mongols, while the Uriankhai formed a separate group. The Ming dynasty had a strong relationship with the Uriankhai, who aided the Yongle Emperor during the civil war and earned his trust. The Emperor resettled them in the territory that had been vacated by Ming troops in 1403.

In the early years of the Yongle era, the Eastern Mongols remained consistently hostile, while the Ming court established relations with the weaker Oirats, whose envoys began visiting China regularly from 1408. Encouraged by the Ming, the Oirats attacked the Eastern Mongols in 1409. The Ming army also intervened but was defeated in September, resulting in the death of its commander, Qiu Fu. This defeat led the Emperor to take direct action. In March 1410, he personally led a massive army from Beijing (Note: The Yongle Emperor's army was said to have had either 300,000 or 500,000 soldiers.) and defeated Öljei Temür Khan Bunyashiri and his chancellor Arughtai after a three-month campaign. Afterward, the Ming dynasty maintained peaceful relations with the Eastern Mongols, now under Arughtai's leadership, for the following decade.

The balance of power on the steppe shifted after 1410. In 1412, the Oirat leader Mahmud killed Bunyashiri and established a puppet khan at Karakorum. As he expanded eastward against Arughtai in an apparent attempt to unite the Mongols under his rule, the Oirats emerged as a powerful new force. Their rise alarmed the Ming court and prompted the Yongle Emperor to launch a second campaign into Mongolia in 1414. The Oirat cavalry suffered heavy losses in a battle along the upper Tuul River due to the superior firepower of the Ming artillery. By August, the Emperor was content with the situation and returned to Beijing.

Renewed hostilities erupted in 1421 when the Eastern Mongols launched cross-border raids. The Emperor decided to march against them in 1422, 1423, and 1424 despite opposition from his ministers. His efforts were ultimately unsuccessful. The campaign was costly and achieved few tangible results, largely because the Mongols avoided direct confrontation with the advancing Ming armies. The Emperor died while returning from his fifth campaign in Mongolia.

The Emperor had been unable to subdue the Mongols. His campaigns into Mongolia did not result in any lasting changes and proved to be extremely costly. Although the Chinese had larger armies, more resources, and better weaponry, the nomads' mobility and the vastness of the battlefield negated these advantages. The Yongle Emperor's policy of exploiting divisions among rival Mongol leaders also proved unsuccessful. Rather than securing Ming influence, it alienated the competing factions and undermined relations between the Mongols and the Ming dynasty. His policies, particularly the withdrawal of several forward garrisons to the vicinity of the Great Wall, weakened the Ming dynasty's position in the steppe.

=== Manchuria, Korea, and Japan ===
Among the Jurchens living in Manchuria, the Ming government sought to maintain peace along the frontier and counter Korean influence. It also aimed to obtain horses and other local products, such as furs, while promoting Chinese culture and values among the Jurchens. The Yongle Emperor sent the first mission to Manchuria in 1403, offering Chinese goods and titles in exchange for the Jurchens' recognition of their subordination. From 1411 onwards, the Emperor entrusted the eunuch Yishiha with expeditions to the distant hunting tribes of northern Manchuria. Yishiha's squadron sailed down the Amur River, reaching as far as its mouth at Tyr, and declared the local Jurchens as subjects of the Ming dynasty.

By acknowledging Ming supremacy, the Koreans secured protection against northern tribes, especially the Jurchens, which brought border stability and enhanced the authority of their government through official recognition from China. The ruling Joseon dynasty only came into power in 1392. The exchange of envoys, which had been frequent under previous emperors, continued during the Yongle era. The Emperor's first ambassadors went to Korea in 1402 to announce his ascension. In the years that followed, there were regular contacts between the two countries, with the Koreans sending two to three delegations per year. The Koreans saw some of the Ming demands as excessive and difficult, but they fulfilled them nonetheless. These demands included providing horses and oxen for military purposes, (Note: In 1403, the king of Korea sent over 1,000 horses and 10,000 oxen. In 1404, 3,000 more horses were sent, and in 1407, before the first Mongolian campaign, another large number of horses was sent.) bronze Buddha statues, relics, paper for printing Buddhist literature, and even sending girls to serve in the imperial harem.

Relations with the Ashikaga government of Japan were at a standstill during the Hongwu era. Chancellor Hu Weiyong, who was executed in 1380, was accused of conspiring with Japanese assistance. In 1399, Shōgun Yoshimitsu (r. 1369–1408) took the initiative to restore contacts in order to make profit from trade with China. This led to another mission being sent in 1403, during which the Yongle Emperor's sovereignty was recognized. In the same year, the Ming government opened maritime trade offices in Ningbo, Quanzhou, and Guangzhou, which allowed Japanese merchants with government licenses to trade. In 1411, Shōgun Yoshimochi (r. 1408–1428) implemented an isolationist policy and interrupted official relations. He also rejected the Ming's attempt to re-establish relations in 1417, although strong demand for Chinese goods and coins sustained illegal private trade through the ports of southern Japan.

=== Đại Việt ===
Đại Việt faced growing internal strife by the late 14th century. The kingdom was known to the Ming as Annam and ruled by the Trần dynasty. Lê Quý Ly overthrew the Trần dynasty in 1400 and renamed the state Đại Ngu. The Yongle Emperor recognized the new Viet government and confirmed Lê Quý Ly's son as the ruler of Đại Ngu in the winter of 1403, but relations between the two countries were strained due to escalating border disputes. Lê Quý Ly prepared for the impending conflict and continued to engage in border skirmishes. In the spring of 1406, his soldiers ambushed Ming diplomatic envoys accompanying the Trần pretender. The incident prompted the Yongle Emperor to order an invasion. The Ming army had attacked Đại Ngu from two directions by late 1406, and resistance was quelled by mid-1407. In July, the country was officially annexed to the Ming dynasty as Jiaozhi Province.

Supporters of the Trần dynasty launched a rebellion in 1408, but the Ming army defeated them the subsequent year. Another rebellion erupted shortly after and was only fully crushed in 1414 when the Chinese captured the rebel leader, Trần Quý Khoáng. The majority of the Ming army was unable to withdraw until 1416. By the end of 1417, the Viet people launched another rebellion, led by military leader Lê Lợi. The Ming generals were unable to suppress the rebellion until the end of the Yongle era. (Note: The war finally came to an end in late 1427 when the Xuande Emperor made the decision to withdraw from Đại Việt. This withdrawal was carried out in the first few months of the following year. By 1431, the newly established Viet state of the Lê dynasty was recognized as a tributary state, although it remained independent in all other aspects.)

=== Other Southeast Asian countries ===
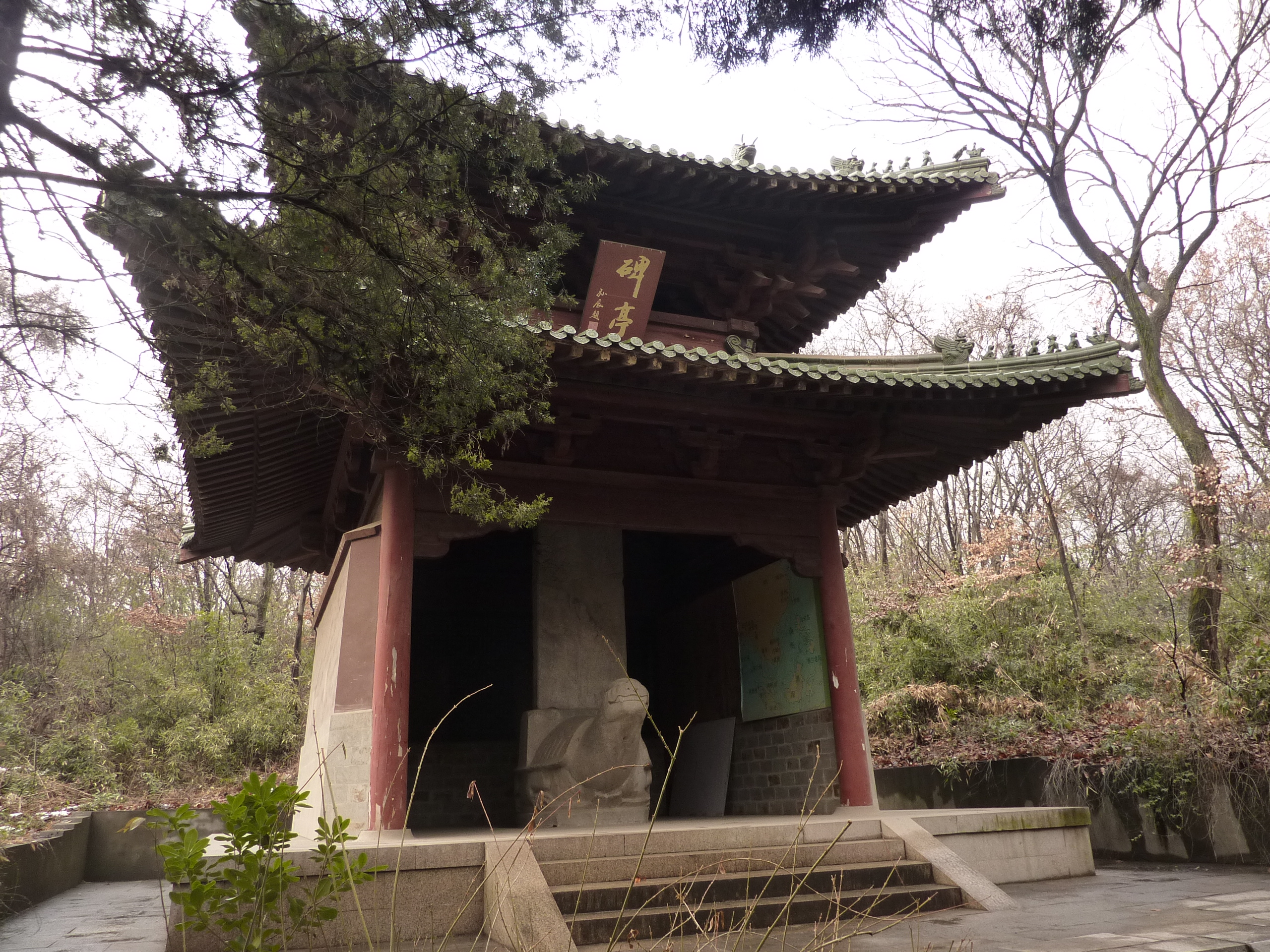
A memorial stele erected in Nanjing in honor of the Sultan of Brunei, who died here in 1408

The Ming dynasty had a strong presence in Southeast Asia during the Yongle era. From 1402 to 1424, the Ming government sent 62 missions to Southeast Asian countries and states (excluding Đại Việt), and received 95 in return. These included important countries such as Champa (in modern-day Vietnam), Malacca, Ayutthaya (in present-day Thailand), Majapahit (centered in Java), Samudera in Sumatra, Khmer, and Brunei, all of which paid tribute to the Yongle Emperor. These local rulers sent precious metals, spices, and rare animals to China, and in return received Chinese goods and coins. The Ming government showed a strong interest in trade and left a lasting impression of their naval power in Southeast Asia, although their focus shifted to northern affairs after 1413.

The ruler of Brunei was the first foreign ruler to sail to Nanjing and visit the Yongle Emperor's court. This visit resulted in more favorable terms of trade relations for Brunei compared to other countries, but tributary exchange with the Philippines was limited. Champa was a significant ally against insurgents in Đại Việt, as they were traditional enemies, but relations cooled in 1414 when the Yongle Emperor refused to return territories previously conquered by the Viets. Despite this, official missions between the two countries continued. The Ming dynasty viewed Ayutthaya positively and had a peaceful relationship with them. In exchange for Ming protection of Malacca, Ayutthaya provided tribute and received profits from the trade.

The rise of Malacca as a significant trading center can be attributed to the support of the Ming dynasty. This support was crucial for the Chinese as it provided them with a strategic foothold in the Strait of Malacca and a reliable vassal. In fact, three successive rulers of Malacca made visits to the imperial court to pledge their loyalty to the Yongle Emperor. The Ming dynasty established a fortified trading post in Malacca, which served as a supply base for its missions to the Indian Ocean. Additionally, during the early 15th century, the sultan of Samudera had a close association with the Ming dynasty, with the Ming fleet stationed on a nearby island to support him in times of war.

The Javanese Majapahit Empire weakened in the early 15th century due to the division of Java and civil war. The presence of the Ming dynasty suppressed its influence in Sumatra, the Malay Peninsula, Borneo, and the southern Philippines. In Java itself, the Ming fleet forcibly subdued the local rulers. In 1407, the Ming expedition became involved in the local conflicts, resulting in the loss of 170 Chinese soldiers. Ming envoys then coerced the Javanese king into paying an indemnity of 60,000 liang (2,238 kg) of gold, threatening that Java would suffer the same fate as Đại Việt if they did not comply.

=== Indian Ocean ===
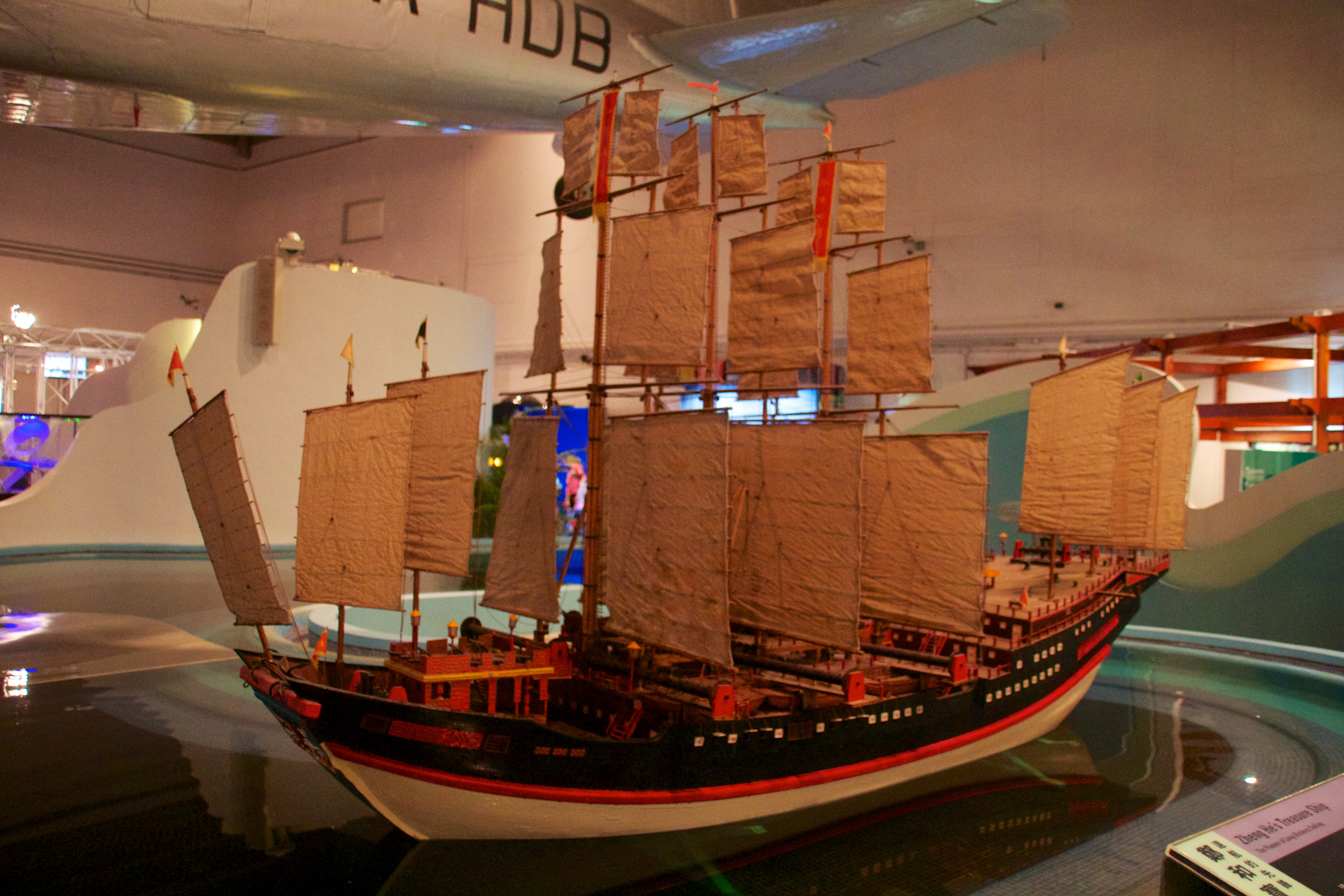
Scale model of a reconstructed "treasure ship" from Zheng He's fleet, Hong Kong Science Museum

In 1405, the Yongle Emperor appointed his favorite commander, the eunuch Zheng He, as admiral of a fleet with the purpose of expanding China's influence and collecting tribute from various nations. Two thousand ships were constructed to aid Zheng He in his seven voyages, including numerous large "treasure ships", and he embarked on six voyages to the Indian Ocean from 1405 to 1421. The first voyage took place from 1405 to 1407 and consisted of 250 or 317 ships, including 62 large "treasure ships". (Note: The size of Zheng He's fleet for the first voyage of 1405–1407 is a topic of debate among scholars. According to the History of Ming records, 62 treasure ships were built for the expedition. However, other sources, including later compilations, suggest a total fleet size of 317 ships by adding 255 auxiliary vessels to the 62 treasure ships. Edward Dreyer argues that this higher figure is likely due to double counting, as the 250 ships ordered in 1403–1404 may have already included the large treasure ships. Based on evidence from the Veritable Records of Taizong and shipbuilding records from the Longjiang Shipyard in Nanjing, Dreyer concludes that the fleet probably consisted of approximately 255 ships in total, including 62 or 63 treasure ships.) A total of 27,800 people were on board. The final voyage was made during the reign of the Xuande Emperor from 1431 to 1433. Chinese sailors followed the main trade routes of Southeast and South Asia, sailing into the Indian Ocean. During the first three expeditions, they sailed to South India, with their main destination being Calicut, the commercial center of the region. In the following four voyages, they reached Hormuz in Persia, while separate squadrons visited various ports in the Arabian Peninsula and East Africa.

In the early years of the Yongle era, Timur's campaigns disrupted traditional trade connections with Central Asia. One of the initial goals of sending emissaries by sea to the Indian Ocean may have been to find potential allies against the Timurid Empire. This goal became less relevant when Timur died in 1405, at the beginning of the campaign to China. The Ming dynasty then established proper relations with his successors.

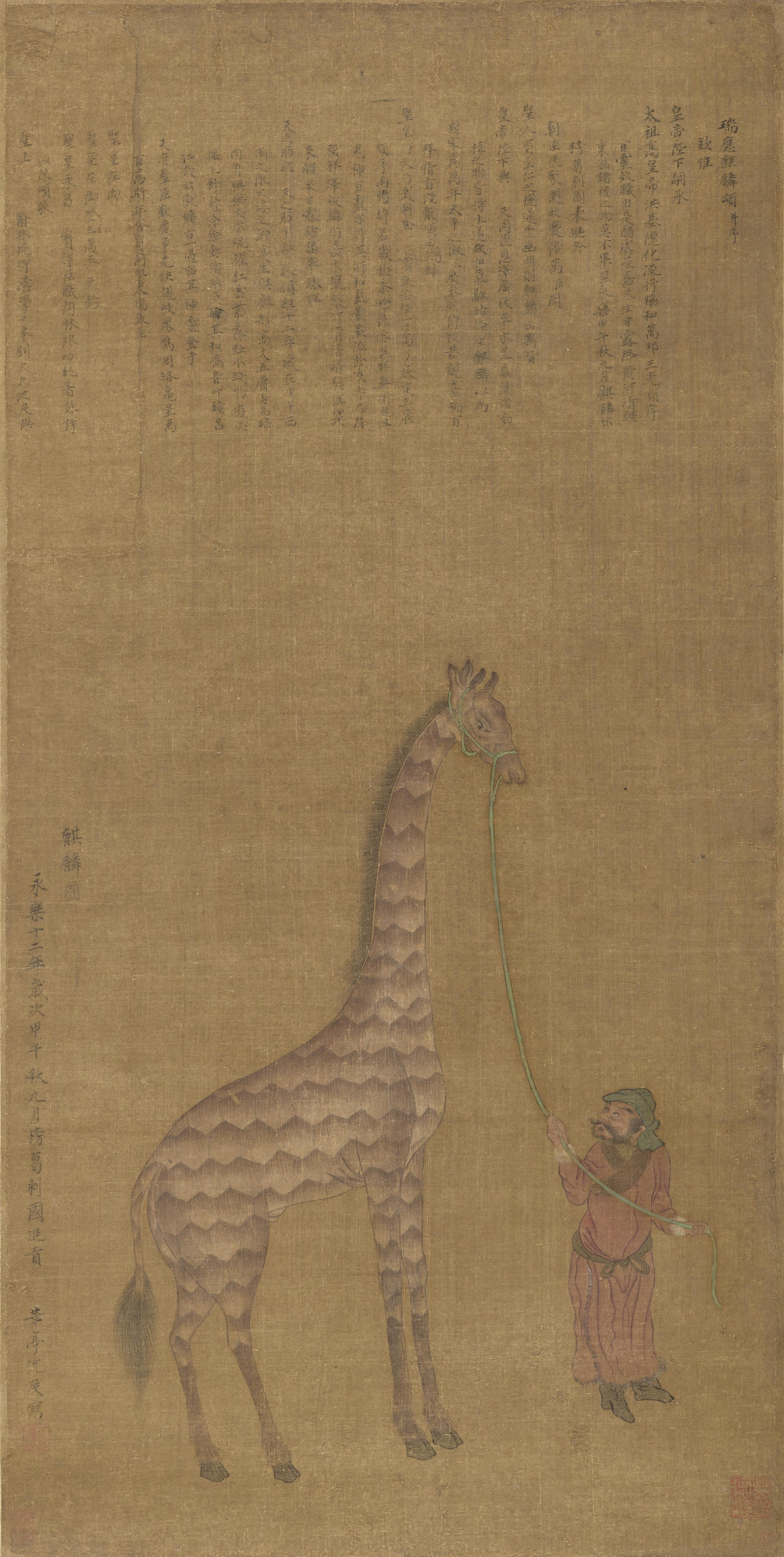
The giraffe, brought from Bengal in 1414, was depicted by Shen Du. The Chinese associated giraffes with the mythical creature Qilin.

In addition to foreign policy and trade goals, Zheng's expeditions also had the task of mapping the countries visited and had an educational aspect as well. The Chinese were interested in bringing back exotic animals and plants for medicinal purposes. After the deaths of Zheng He in 1433 and the Xuande Emperor in 1435, large-scale maritime expeditions were discontinued by a government dominated by Confucian-trained scholar-officials who favored restricting foreign interaction and maritime commerce. The loss of key supporters of long-distance sailing was just one factor in the decision to abandon an active maritime policy. In the eyes of the bureaucracy, the high costs of maintaining the fleet primarily meant an undue increase in the power of eunuchs, who controlled these funds. Cutting naval expenditures also reduced the eunuchs' influence at court.

== Conversion table ==
Yongle	1	2	3	4	5	6	7	8	9	10
AD	1403	1404	1405	1406	1407	1408	1409	1410	1411	1412
Yongle	11	12	13	14	15	16	17	18	19	20
AD	1413	1414	1415	1416	1417	1418	1419	1420	1421	1422
Yongle	21	22								
AD	1423	1424								
