= Viceroy of Zhili's Office (Baoding) =

Building in Baoding, Hebei, China

Governor's Office of Zhili Province
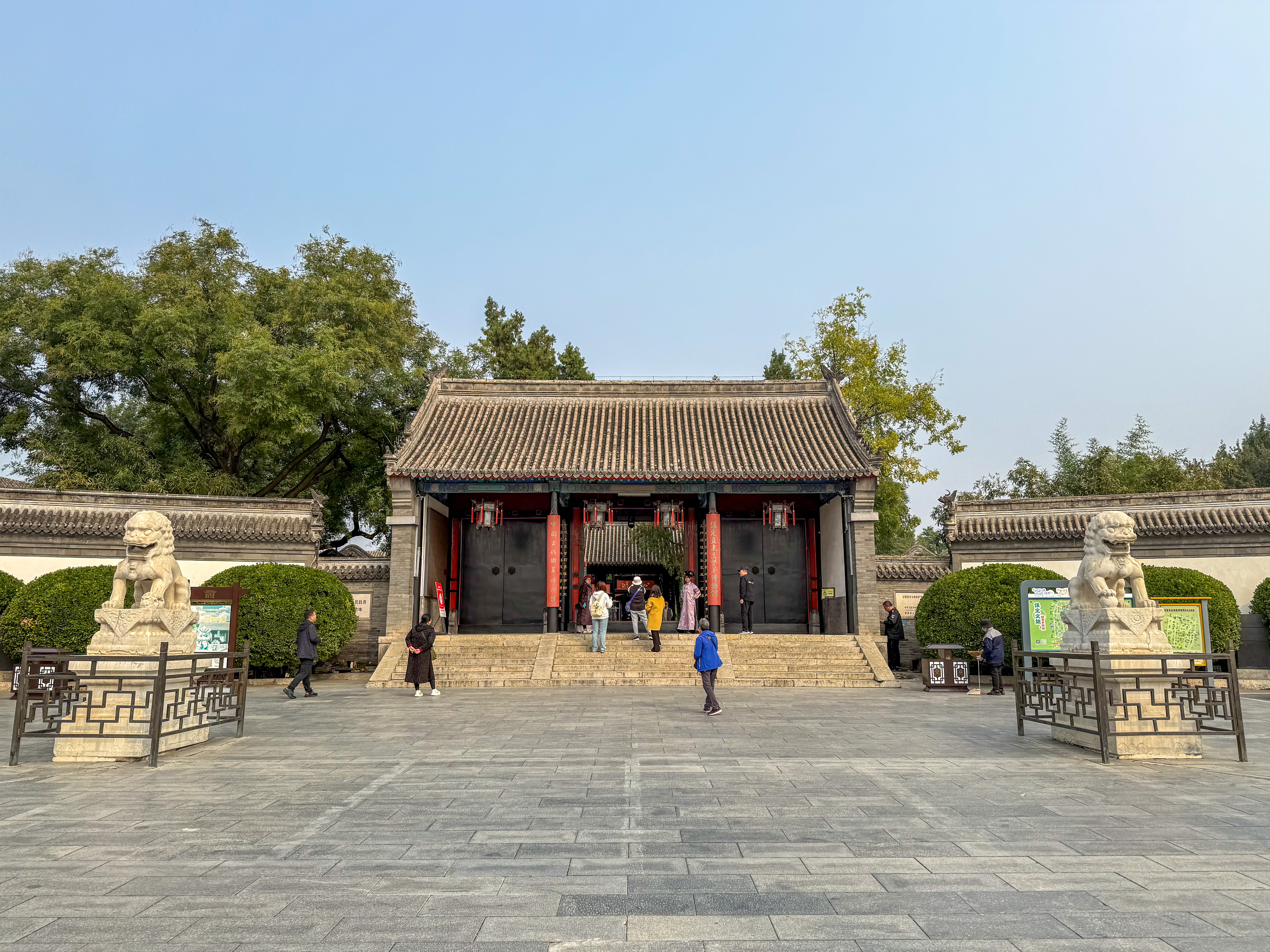
- The gate of the Zhili Governor-General's Office
- Interactive map of Governor's Office of Zhili Province
- 38°51′29.808″N 115°29′26.736″E
- Periods: Qing dynasty
- Location: Hebei Baoding

The Viceroy of Zhili's Office (Baoding), also known as the Zhili Governor-General's Yamen, is located on Yuhua Road in Baoding, Hebei. In the early Ming dynasty, it served as the Baoding Prefectural Yamen, and during the Yongle era of the Ming dynasty, it was used as the office of the Daning Regional Military Commission. In the early Qing dynasty, it served as the office of a regional commander (canjiang). In the eighth year of the Yongzheng reign (1730), Tang Zhiyu, then Viceroy of Zhili, relocated the Zhili Governor-General's Yamen to the former site of the Ming-era Daning Regional Military Commission. It served as the office of the Viceroy of Zhili during the Qing dynasty and is the only surviving intact provincial-level yamen in China dating from the Qing dynasty.

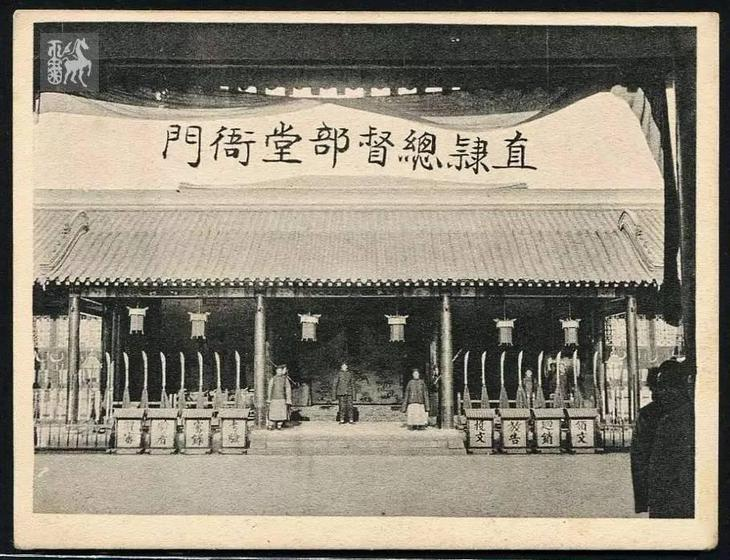
Zhili Governor General's Office

The yamen was established in the seventh year of the Yongzheng reign (1729) and remained in use until the fall of the Qing dynasty, lasting for 182 years.In January 1988, it was included by the State Council of the People's Republic of State Council of China in the third batch of the National priority protected siteProtected at the National Level list.
