= Changping Garrison =

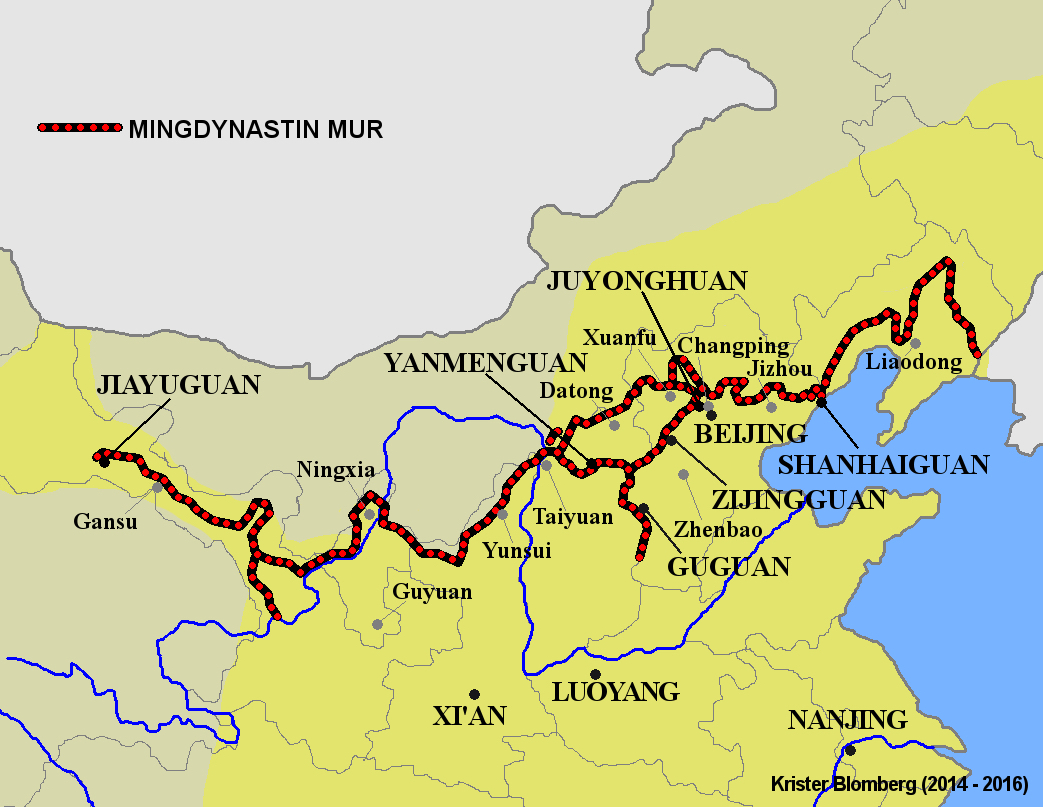
Map of the Ming Great Wall. The gray dots on the map indicate the locations of the military garrisons.

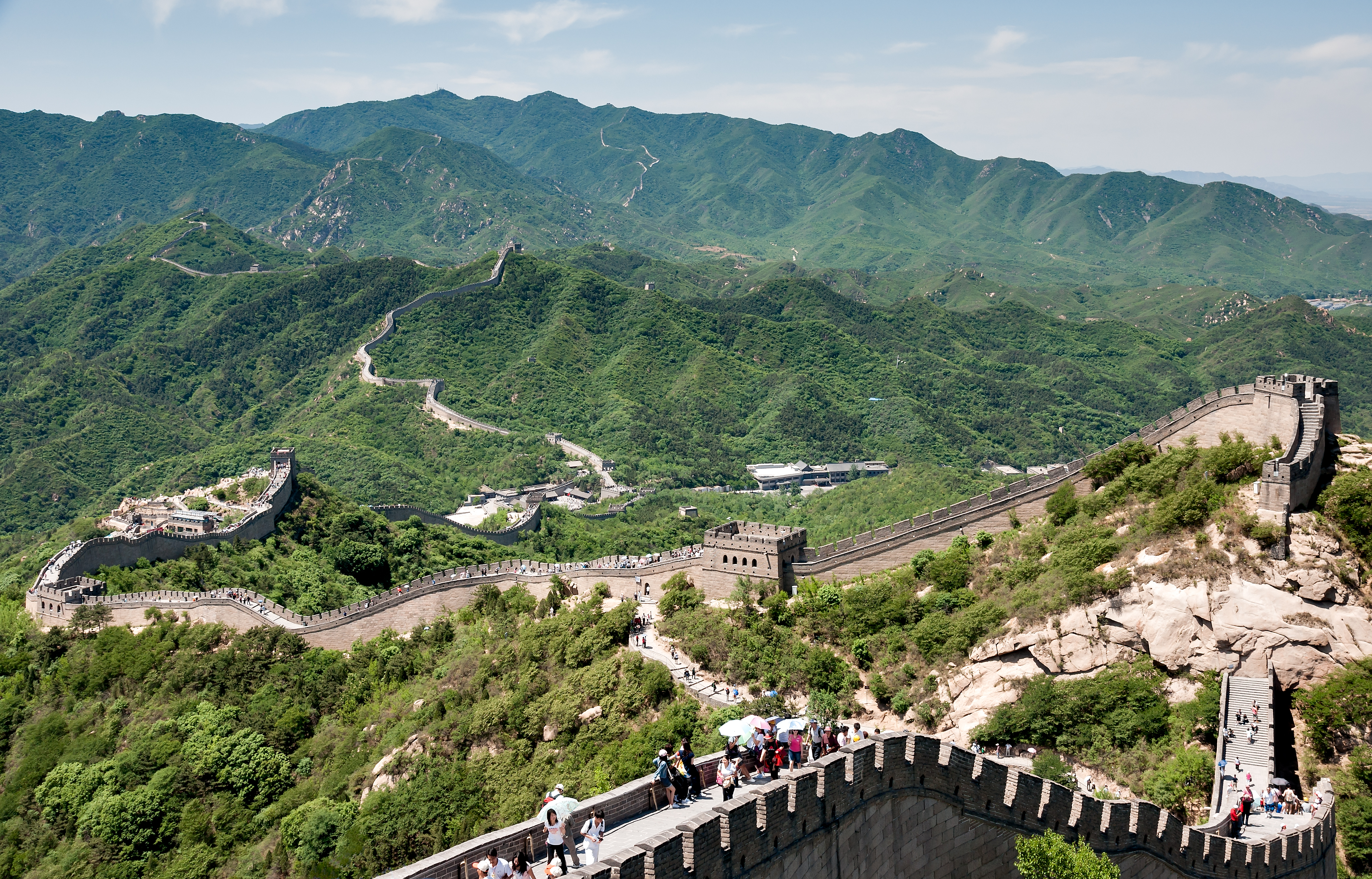
The Great Wall of China at Badaling is part of the Changping Garrison.

The Changping Garrison (Chinese: 昌平镇; pinyin: Chāngpíngzhèn), also known as the Chang Garrison, was a defensive garrison during the Ming dynasty. Its main responsibility was to defend the Great Wall of China approaches to the north and west of Beijing. Along with the Zhenbao Garrison, it was one of two additional defense garrisons established in addition to the original nine garrisons of the Ming dynasty.

The Changping Garrison was established during the reign of the Jiajing Emperor (1522–1567). Its headquarters were situated in Changping, northwest of Beijing, and its primary responsibility was to safeguard the capital and the imperial tombs. The garrison's territory extended from Mutianyu, north of Beijing, to Huanghuacheng and Badaling in the west. It then continued southwest along the inner defense line, west of Beijing, to the Zijing Pass in Hebei, northwest of Yi County. The area east of Badaling was previously under the jurisdiction of the Jizhou Garrison. In total, the defensive line of the Changping Garrison encompassed 230 km of the Great Wall.

The garrison was under the command of Jiliao. It shared its eastern border with the Jizhou Garrison and its southern border with the Zhenbao Garrison.

== See also ==
- Nine Garrisons of the Ming dynasty
- Great Wall of China
