= Garrison =

Troops stationed in a particular location

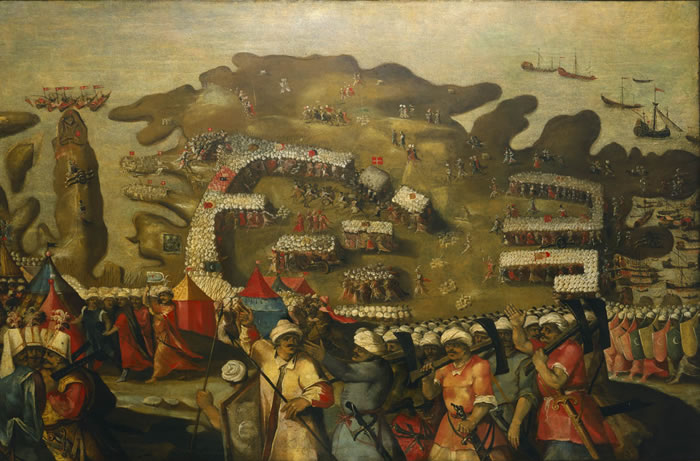
Arrival of the dean fleet, showing the garrison of Malta in 1565 and the Ottoman invasion force.

A garrison is a body of troops stationed in a particular location, originally to guard it and the facilities that constitute a military base or fortified military headquarters. A garrison is usually in a city, town, fort, castle, ship, or similar site. "Garrison town" is a common expression for any town that has a military base nearby.

== Etymology ==
The term garrison comes from the French garnison from the verb garnir meaning 'to equip'.

== History ==
"Garrison towns" (Arabic: أمصار, romanized: amsar) were used during the Arab Islamic conquests of new lands captured from the Romans, Persians and Visigoth by Arab-Muslim armies to increase their provision of Dawah and municipal order over non-muslims populations who were not compelled to convert. In order to replace the defeated Roman and Persian elite in the new conquered areas, Muslims including new converts were encouraged to join these new border towns from different corners of the expanding Muslim empire, and settled into garrison towns as well as given a share in the spoils of war and starting to implement the organisation of the new town (The First Islamic Empire Chase F Robinson. The Roman Empire in Context: Historical and Comparative Perspectives, 229-248, 2011.

In the United Kingdom, "garrison" also specifically refers to any of the major military stations such as Aldershot, Catterick, Colchester, Tidworth, Bulford, and London, which have more than one barracks or camp and their own military headquarters, usually commanded by a colonel, brigadier or major-general, assisted by a garrison sergeant major.

In Ireland, Association football (as distinct from Gaelic football) has historically been termed the "garrison game" or the "garrison sport" for its connections with British military serving in Irish cities and towns.

In 18th-century Newfoundland and Labrador, garrisons served as important components of colonial life. Some garrisons reached a peak of 300 men during the French and Indian War. In times of peace, only a few dozen soldiers would staff the garrison. Nine garrisons was a system employed by the Ming dynasty that was meant to defend the northern border of the great wall.
