= Qianxi =

Qianxi may refer to two counties of the People's Republic of China:

- Qianxi, Guizhou (黔西市)
- Qianxi County, Hebei (迁西县)
