= Nine Garrisons of the Ming dynasty =

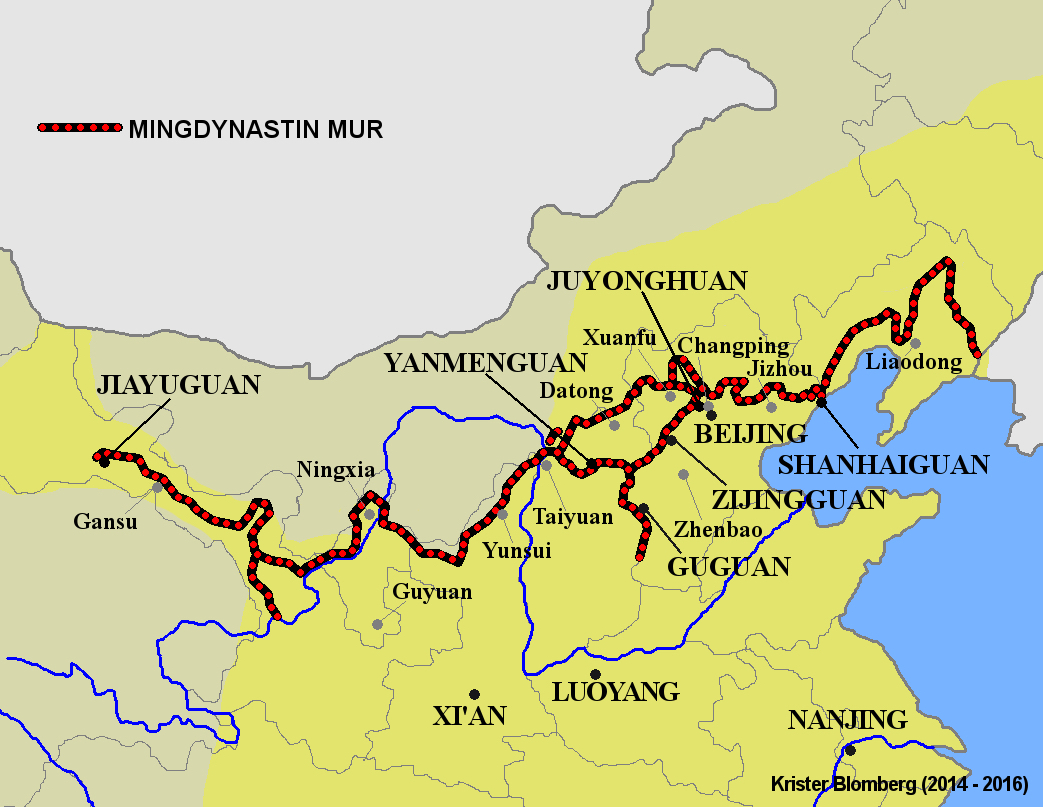
Map of the Ming Great Wall. The gray dots on the map indicate the locations of the military garrisons.

The Nine Garrisons, or Nine Defense Areas (Chinese: 九边; pinyin: Jiǔbiān, also known as Chinese: 九镇; pinyin: Jiǔzhèn), was a system implemented during the Ming dynasty (1368–1644) to protect the northern border and the Great Wall. Originally consisting of nine garrisons, the system was later expanded to eleven. Each garrison was controlled from a fortified garrison town, strategically located at important passages and reinforced militarily. The leadership of the garrisons was divided among three supreme commanders: Jiliao, Xuanda, and Shaanxi sanbian. Each garrison had a military commander, as well as a civilian administration. In total, approximately 300,000 soldiers and officers were deployed in the garrisons.

== Garrisons under Jiliao ==
Jiliao is a shortened term used to refer to the regions of Jizhou and Liaodong. The jurisdiction of Jiliao encompasses the following garrisons:

- Liaodong (遼東鎮) was headquartered in Liaoyang. Its area of responsibility extended from the Hushan Wall on the Korean border river Yalu in the east to Shanhaiguan in the west, covering a total distance of 975 km.
- Jizhou (薊州鎮), also known as Ji, was established by the Yongle Emperor (r. 1402–1424). Its headquarters were likely situated in Santunying, northwest of Qianxi. The garrison's jurisdiction covered the Great Wall of China, spanning from Shanhaiguan in the east to the Juyong Pass north of Beijing, encompassing a total distance of 600 km.
- Changping (昌平镇), established by the Jiajing Emperor (r. 1522–1567), was located in Changping, northwest of Beijing. Its primary responsibility was to protect the capital and the imperial tombs. The garrison's jurisdiction extended from Jiankou, north of Beijing, where the Great Wall divides, to Zijingguan, located outside of Yi County, covering a total distance of 230 km.
- Zhenbao (真保镇), established by the Jiajing Emperor, had its headquarters in Baoding, and was responsible for protecting the southern part of the Great Wall of China. This section of the wall stretched from Zijingguan, past Daomaguan, along the border between Hebei and Shanxi, and possibly as far south as Wu'an, covering a total distance of 390 km.

== Garrisons under Xuanda ==
Xuanda is a combination of the names Xuanfu and Datong. The jurisdiction of Xuanda encompasses the following garrisons:

- Xuanfu (宣府鎮) was established by the Yongle Emperor (r. 1402–1424) and its headquarters were situated near present-day Xuanhua. The garrison's jurisdiction extended from Juyongguan, north of Beijing, to Huai'an, northeast of Datong, covering a total distance of 510 km. Due to its strategic location northwest of Beijing, the Xuanfu Garrison's wall was reinforced for added protection.
- Datong (大同鎮) was headquartered in Datong, with a responsibility area spanning from Tianzhen in the northeast to Qingshuihe at the northeast bend of the Yellow River, covering a total distance of 335 km.
- Taiyuan (太原鎮) also known as the Shanxi Garrison, was controlled from Pianguan. Its area of responsibility extended from Hequ on the Yellow River, facing east past Yanmenguan towards the Taihang Mountains on the border of Hebei, to the Zhenbao Wall, covering a total distance of 800 km.

== Garrisons under Shaanxi sanbian ==
The following garrisons were under the authority of Shaanxi sanbian:

- Yansui (延綏鎮) was headquartered in Yulin. Its area of responsibility extended from Fugu on the Yellow River to Yanchi in Ningxia, near the border of Shaanxi. This covered a total distance of 885 km.
- Ningxia (寧夏鎮) was headquartered in Yinchuan, a city located on the Yellow River. Its area of responsibility extended from Yanchi to Zhongwei along the Yellow River.
- Guyuan (固原鎮), also known as the Shaanxi Garrison, was headquartered in Guyuan, Ningxia. Its jurisdiction extended from Jingbian to Gaolan in Gansu, along the Yellow River, covering a total distance of 500 km.
- Gansu (甘肅鎮) was headquartered in Zhangye. Its area of responsibility extended from Lanzhou on the Yellow River westward to the Jiayu Pass, covering a total distance of 800 km.

== See also ==
- Chinese military history
