= Jizhou Garrison =

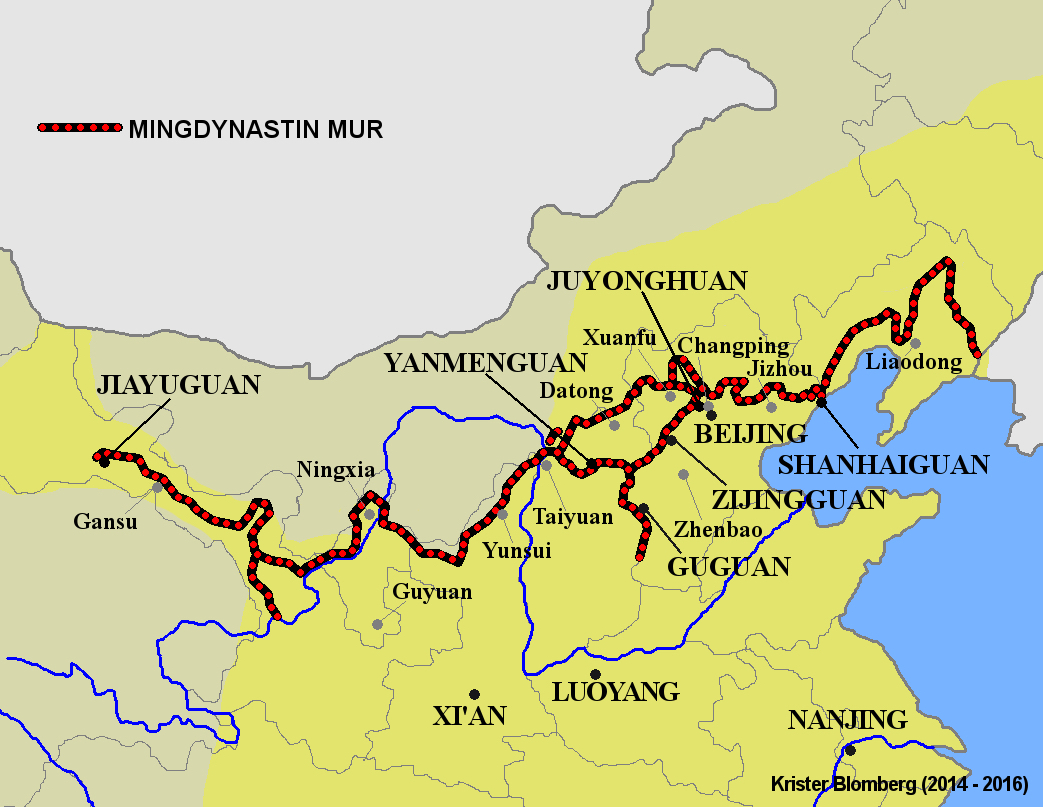
Map of the Ming Great Wall. The gray dots on the map indicate the locations of the military garrisons.

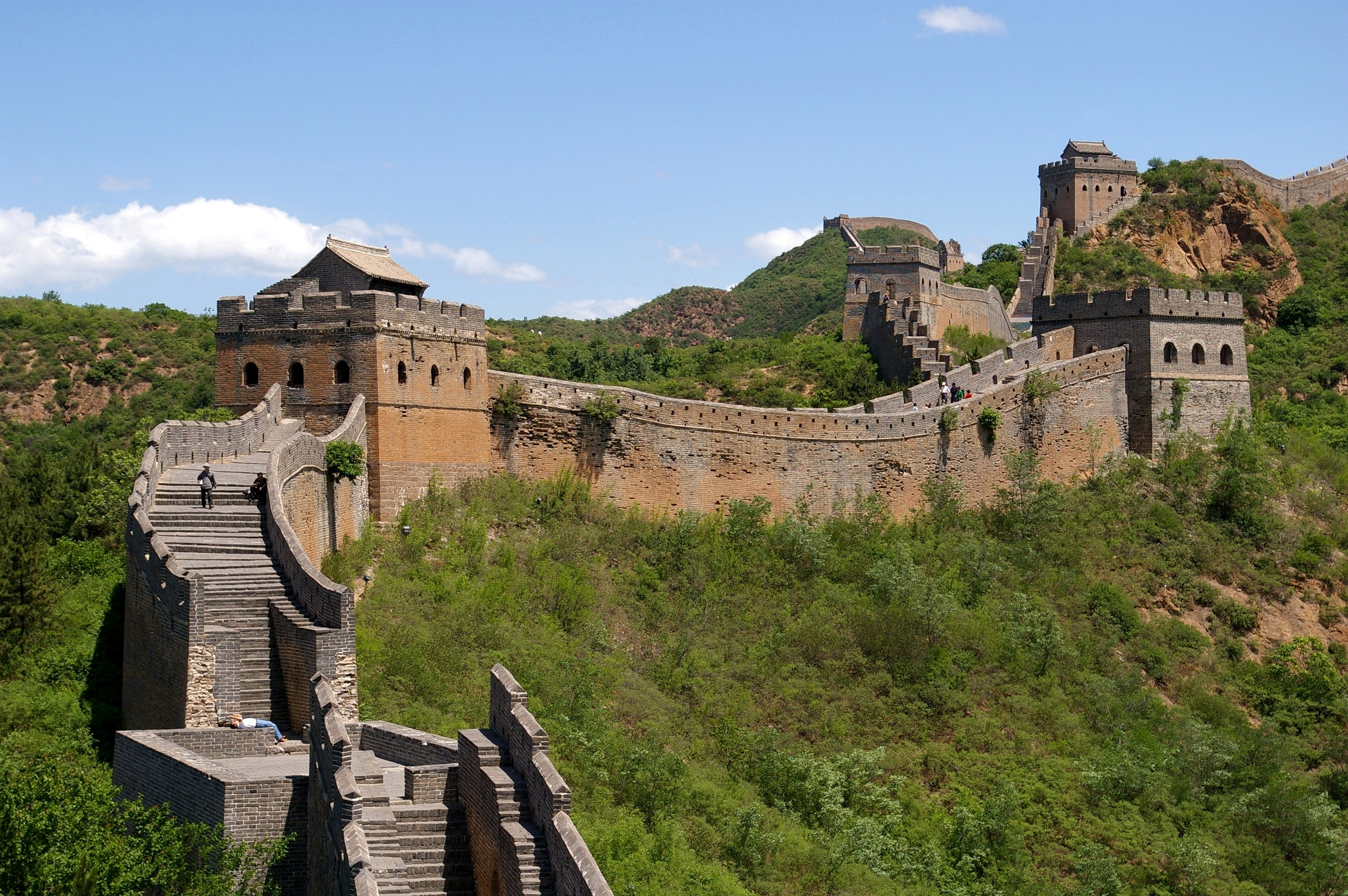
The Great Wall of China at Jinshanling is a section that was once part of the Jizhou Garrison.

The Jizhou Garrison (Chinese: 蓟州镇; pinyin: Jìzhōuzhèn), also known as Ji, was one of the Nine Garrisons established during the Ming dynasty. It was under the command of Jiliao. The garrison was established during the reign of the Yongle Emperor (r. 1402–1424). Its headquarters likely located at Santunying, northwest of Qianxi in Hebei. The garrison's main responsibility was to defend the Great Wall of China in the Yan Mountains, stretching from Shanhai Pass in the east to the Juyong Pass north of Beijing.

The section of the Great Wall under the jurisdiction of the Jizhou garrison was divided into 11 sections and 27 sub-sections. These included well-known sections such as Badaling, Shui Pass, Huanghuacheng, Jiankou, Mutianyu, Baimaguan Fort, Gubeikou, Jinshanling, Simatai, and Huangya Pass. The garrison was responsible for a total of 600 or possibly 700 kilometers of the wall. As the capital city of Beijing was located south of the garrison's defensive line, the wall in this area held great strategic importance. Construction of the Great Wall in this region began in 1551 and underwent significant renovations and expansions from 1567 to 1572, led by General Qi Jiguang.

The Jizhou Garrison shared borders with the Liaodong Garrison to the east and the Xuanfu Garrison to the west.

== See also ==
- Nine Garrisons of the Ming dynasty
- Great Wall of China
