= Hou Xian =

Ming dynasty eunuch envoy

- 侯顯
- Born: 1365
- Died: 1438 (aged 72–73)
- Occupations: Eunuch, diplomat
- Era: Ming dynasty
- Known for: Diplomatic missions to Tibet, Nepal, Bengal, and elsewhere in South Asia

Hou Xian (Chinese: 侯顯; Wade–Giles: Hou Hsien; 1365–1438) was a Ming dynasty eunuch and imperial envoy active during the reigns of the Yongle Emperor and Xuande Emperor. He was sent on diplomatic missions to Tibet, Nepal, Bengal, and other South Asian polities. The History of Ming states that Hou made "five missions to distant regions" and describes his achievements as second only to those of Zheng He.

== Career ==
=== Mission to Tibet ===
During the early Yongle reign, Hou Xian served as a deputy director in the Office of Ceremonial Affairs, a eunuch agency of the Ming court. The Yongle Emperor, who had heard tales of a Tibetan Buddhist religious teacher named Shangshi Halima, ordered Hou Xian and the monk Zhi Guang to carry imperial letters and gifts to Tibet to invite Halima to the Ming court. Modern scholarship identifies Halima with Deshin Shekpa, the Fifth Karmapa.

Hou set out in 1403 and returned with the Tibetan party in late 1406 or early 1407. The Yongle Emperor received Halima with elaborate ceremonies and bestowed titles, seals, and gifts on him and his followers. Hou was promoted for his service on the mission.

=== Nepal and Bengal ===
In 1413, Hou was sent to Nibalai, identified with Nepal, and Diyongta, probably Bhaktapur. According to the History of Ming, the ruler of Nibalai sent envoys back with Hou to the Ming court, presented tribute, and received royal investiture, patents, and a seal.

In July 1415, the Yongle Emperor ordered Hou Xian to lead a fleet to the Bengal Sultanate and other countries. The Ming Veritable Records state that they were ordered to confer velvet brocades, patterned fine silks, damasks, thin silks interwoven with gold thread, and other goods on the kings of those countries. This mission occurred during a period of frequent diplomatic contact between Ming China and Bengal, including Bengal's presentation of a giraffe to the Ming court in 1414.

In 1420, after the king of Bengal complained that the Jaunpur Sultanate had repeatedly attacked Bengal's territory, Hou was again sent as an envoy. According to the Ming Veritable Records, the Ming court instructed the two rulers to cultivate good relations and protect their own territories. Around the same time, the Timurids also intervened diplomatically. Ultimately, Jaunpur's attacks ceased, likely a result of these foreign diplomatic efforts. Hou's party was also ordered to confer silks on the rulers of both sultanates, as well as on the chief of the "Land of the Diamond Throne", possibly Bodh Gaya, through which the mission was expected to pass.

=== Second Tibetan mission ===
In 1427, the Xuande Emperor dispatched Hou to Central Tibet and Nepal with gifts for local dignitaries, reviving Ming contact with the region after the short reign of the Hongxi Emperor. On the way, his party encountered raiders; Hou led his men in combat, and more than 460 people were later rewarded or promoted for their service.

=== Later life and death ===
After the end of the large-scale state-sponsored overseas expeditions in the 1430s, Ming maritime contact with overseas polities continued mainly through tributary trade, but at a reduced scale. Hou Xian died in 1438.

== Connection with Zheng He and assessment ==
Some later sources state that Hou Xian accompanied Zheng He and Wang Jinghong on the second and third Ming treasure voyages. This claim is treated cautiously by modern scholars because neither Ming Veritable Records and the History of Ming clearly document Hou's participation in the treasure fleet voyages, while some later Ming and Qing texts do. Hou's independent diplomatic career nevertheless formed part of the same Yongle-era policy of using trusted eunuchs as envoys to foreign courts.

The History of Ming groups Hou Xian with Zheng He among the notable eunuch envoys of the early Ming. It describes him as talented, eloquent, energetic, and willing to take responsibility, and states that his achievements were second only to Zheng He's.

== See also ==
- Zheng He
- Ming treasure voyages
- Ming–Tibet relations
- Bengal Sultanate
- Deshin Shekpa
