= Xuanfu Garrison =

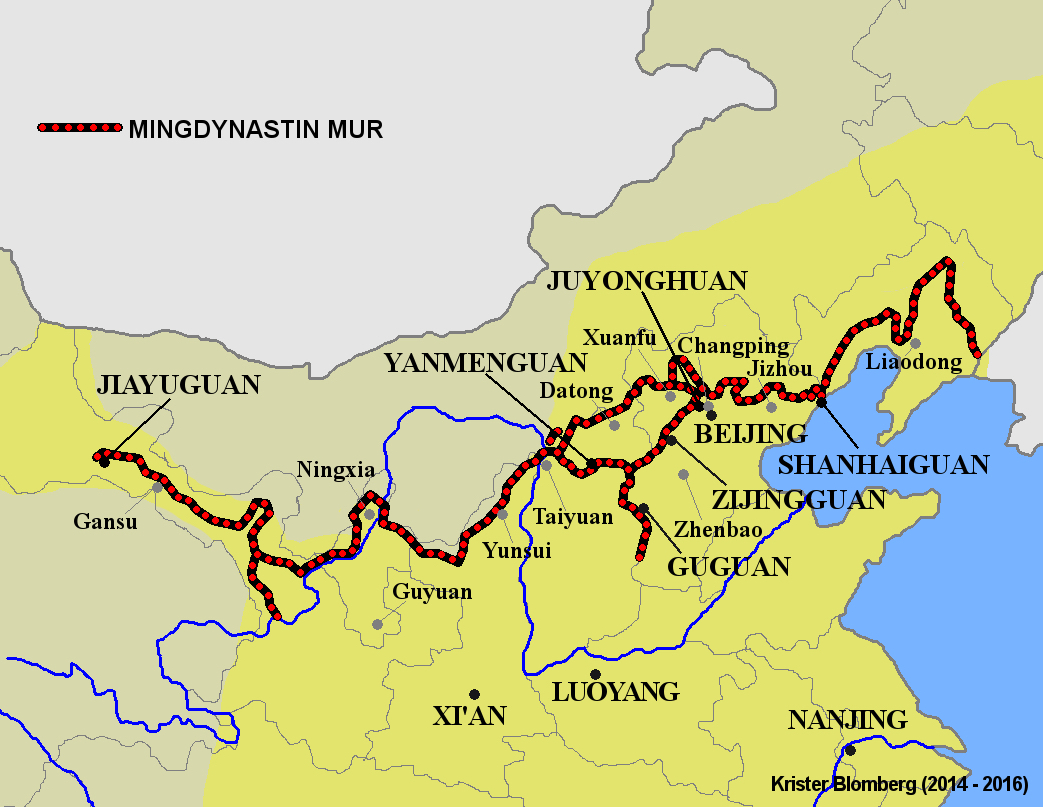
Map of the Ming Great Wall. The gray dots on the map indicate the locations of the military garrisons.

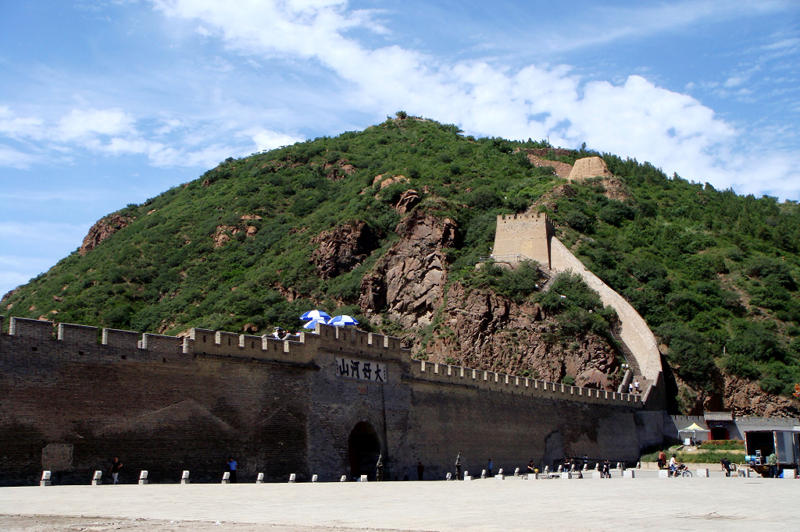
The Great Wall of China at Dajingmen is a significant part of the Xuanfu Garrison's area of responsibility.

The Xuanfu Garrison (Chinese: 宣府镇; pinyin: Xuānfǔzhèn) was one of the Nine Garrisons established by the Ming dynasty to defend the northern border and Great Wall of China.

The area of responsibility was the defense of the outer stretch of the Great Wall, spanning from Juyong Pass north of Beijing to Huai'an, located 40 km west of Zhangjiakou in Hebei. Due to its strategic location northwest of Beijing, the wall in the Xuanfu Garrison was reinforced and often consisted of several parallel layers, including the strategic passage of Dajingmen north of Zhangjiakou. In total, the Xuanfu Garrison was responsible for 510 km of the Great Wall.

The garrison was established during the reign of the Yongle Emperor (r. 1402–1424). Its headquarters were located near present-day Xuanhua, 20 km southeast of Zhangjiakou. The wall belonging to the Xuanfu Garrison was built in the mid-16th century following repeated attacks by the Mongols, led by Altan Khan.

The Xuanfu Garrison was under the command of Xuanda. To the east, it bordered the Jizhou Garrison, and to the west, the Datong Garrison.

== See also ==
- Nine Garrisons of the Ming dynasty
- Great Wall of China
