= Datong Garrison =

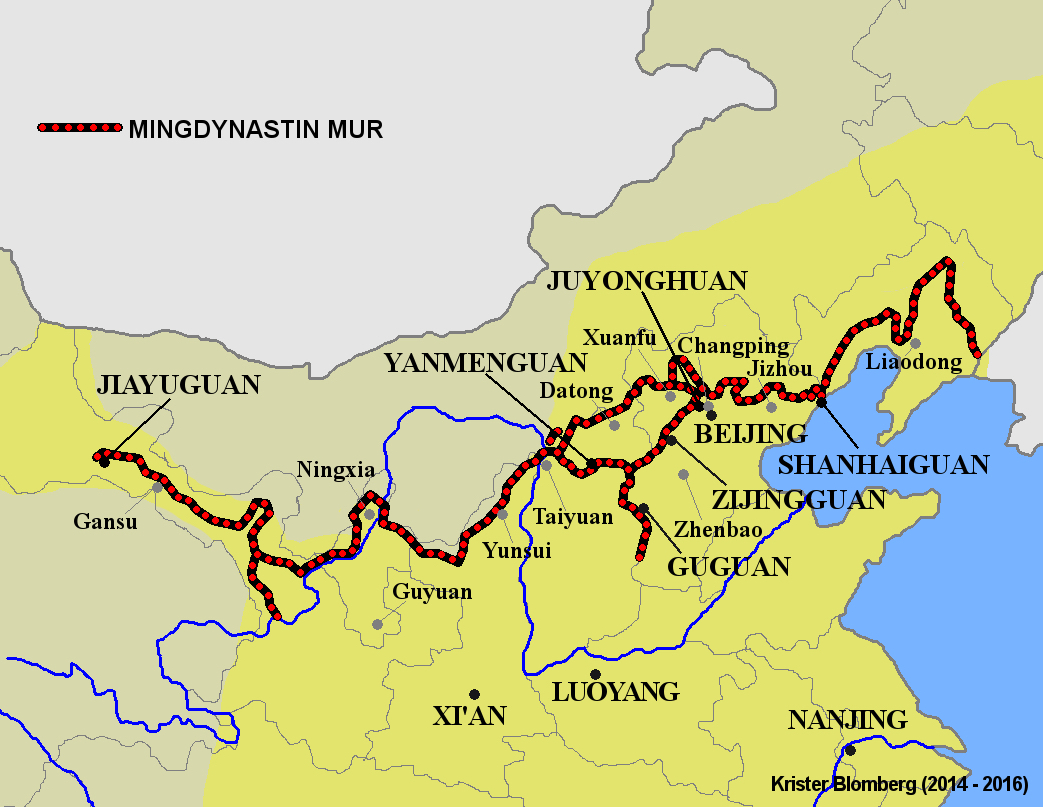
Map of the Ming Great Wall. The gray dots on the map indicate the locations of the military garrisons.

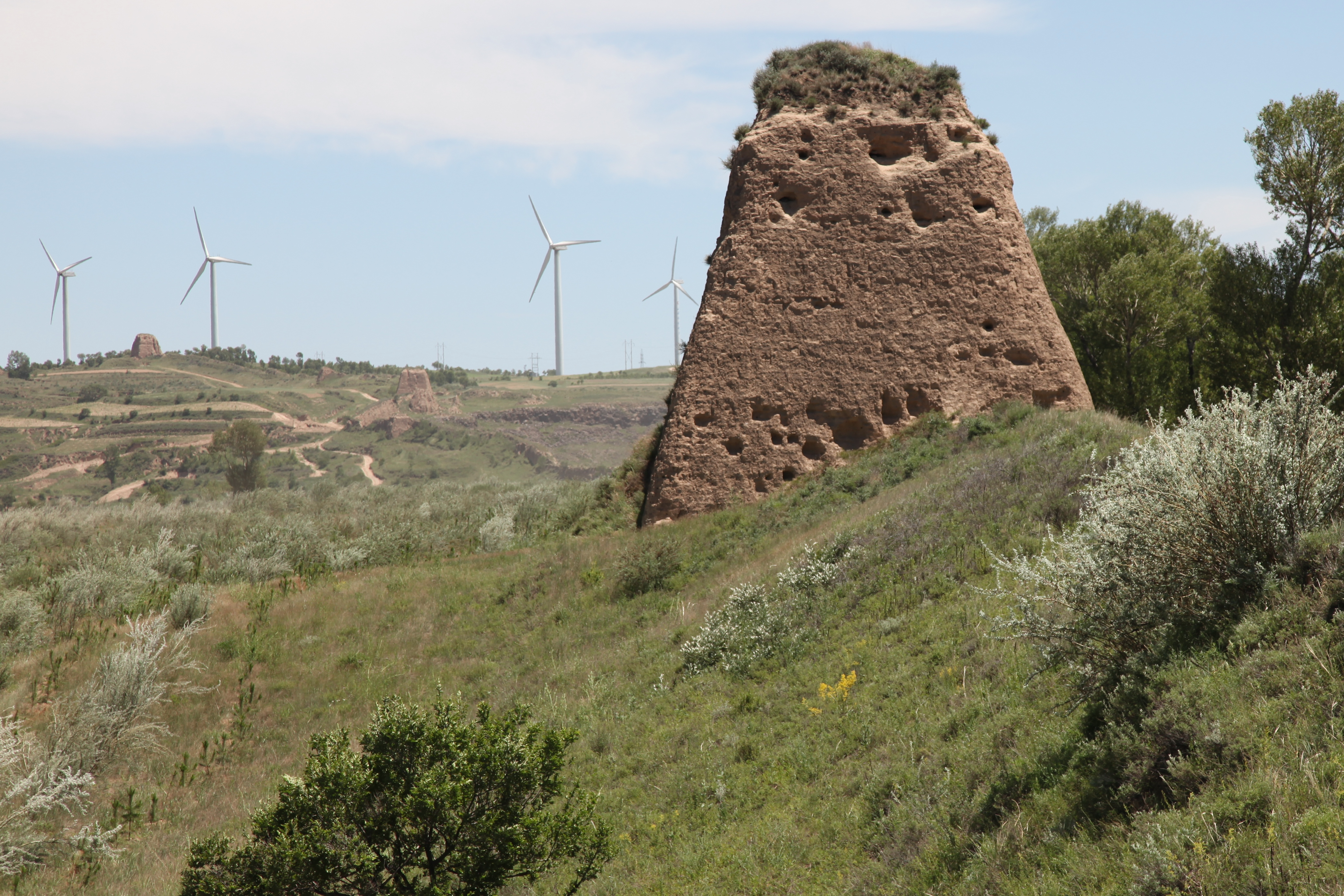
The ruins of the Great Wall of China at Shahukou are located within the Datong Garrison's area of responsibility.

The Datong Garrison (Chinese: 大同鎮; pinyin: Dàtóngzhèn) was one of the Nine Garrisons established by the Ming dynasty to defend the northern border and Great Wall of China.

The area of responsibility was to defend the outer stretch of the Great Wall, starting from Piantou Pass on the Yellow River and extending northeast to Shahukou. It then continued further east, reaching north of Datong and ending at Huai'an, which is located 40 km west of Zhangjiakou in Hebei, where it joined the wall under the Xuanfu Garrison. The wall that belonged to the Datong Garrison was constructed in the mid-16th century following repeated attacks by the Mongols, led by Altan Khan. The Datong Garrison was responsible for 330 km of the Great Wall.

The garrison was under the command of Xuanda, and its headquarters were located in present-day Datong, Shanxi.

To the east, the Datong Garrison shared a border with the Xuanfu Garrison, and to the west, it bordered the Yansui Garrison.
