= Liaodong Garrison =

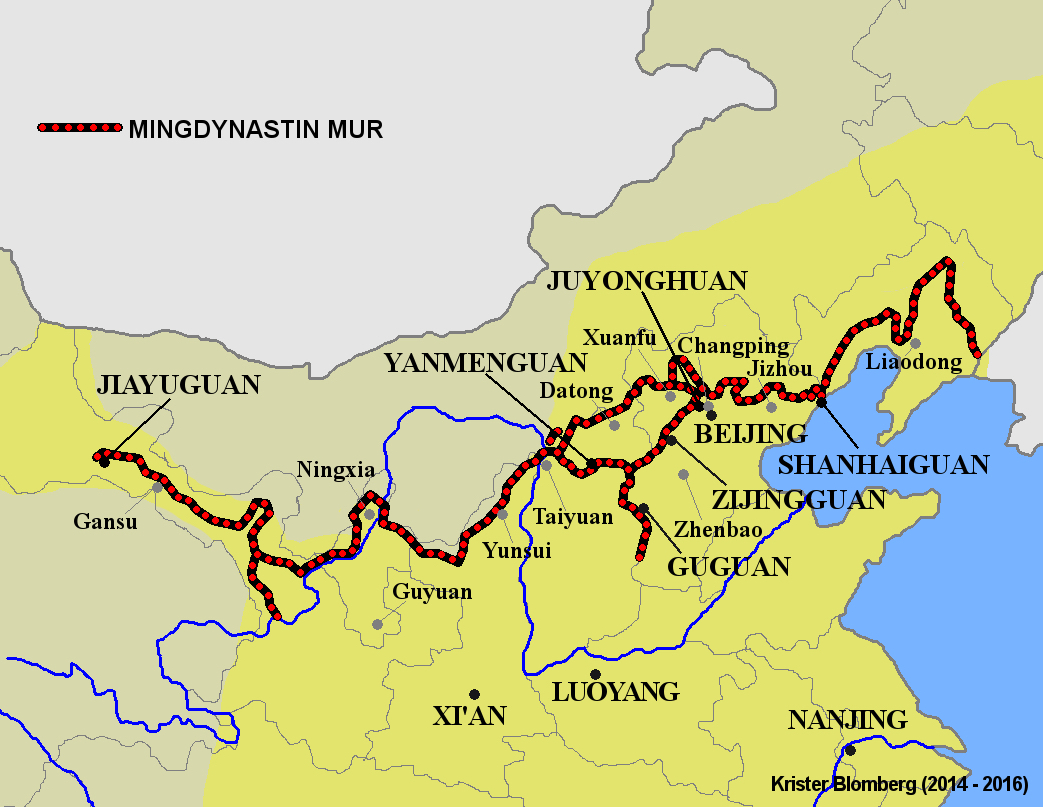
Map of the Ming Great Wall. The gray dots on the map indicate the locations of the military garrisons.

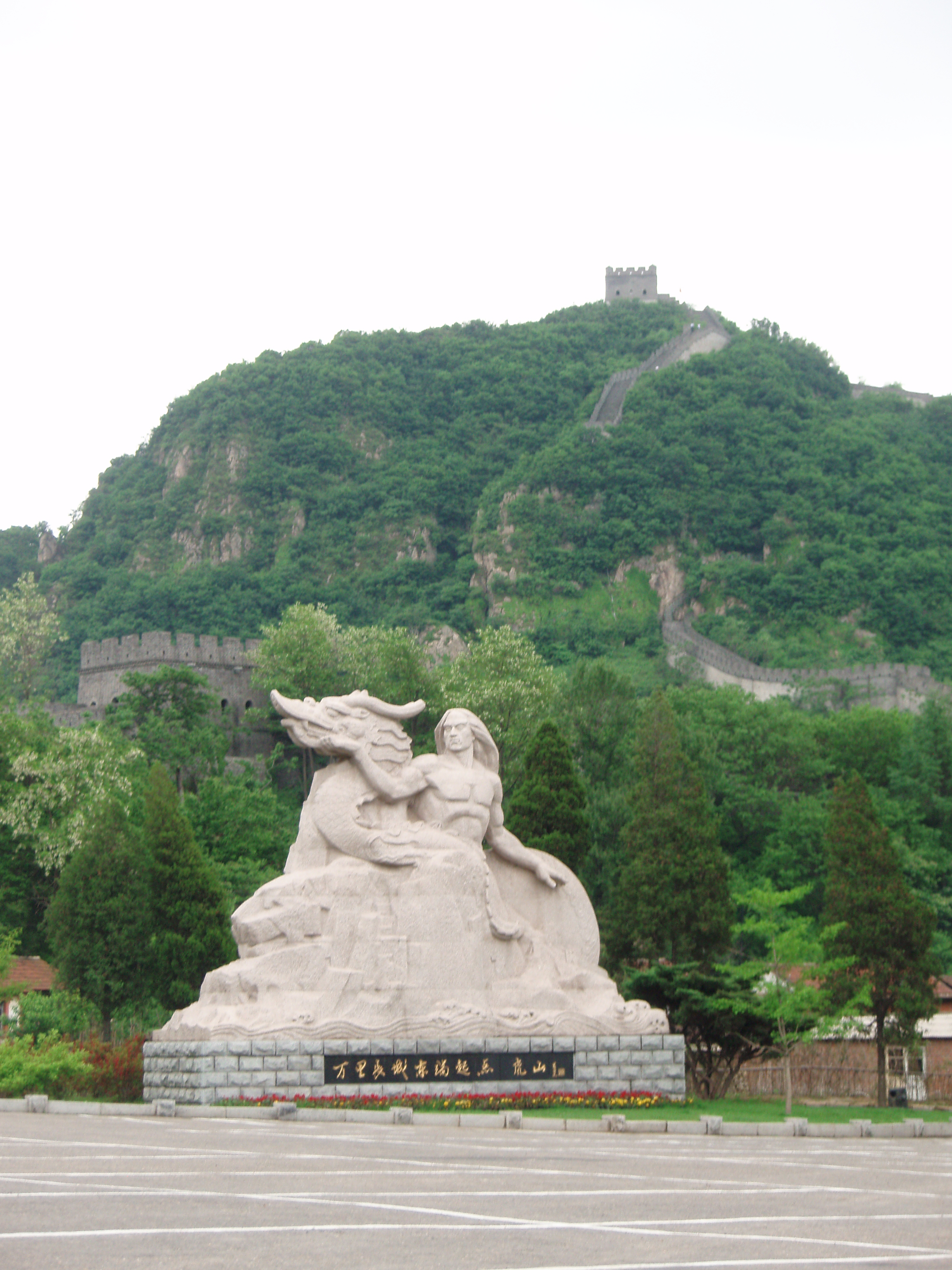
The Hushan Wall in Dandong which was part of the Liaodong Garrison's area of responsibility.

The Liaodong Garrison (simplified Chinese: 辽东镇; traditional Chinese: 遼東鎮; pinyin: Liáodōngzhèn) was one of the Nine Garrisons established by the Ming dynasty to defend the northern border and Great Wall of China.

The area of responsibility was to defend the eastern section of the Great Wall in Liaoning, which extends from the Shanhai Pass on the Bohai Bay to the Hushan Wall in Dandong on the Yalu River, along the Chinese side of the border with North Korea. This garrison area covers a total of 975 km of the wall. The Liaodong Garrison was under the command of Jiliao and was headquartered in Liaoyang.

The Great Wall in the Liaodong Garrison was the first to be built during the Ming dynasty. Its western part was built to protect China from the Mongols, while the eastern part served as protection against the Manchus (Jurchen). The middle part of the Liaodong Garrison Wall, along the Liao River, was constructed during the reign of the Yongle Emperor (r. 1402–1424). The western part was completed during the first reign of the Emperor Yingzong (1434–1449), and the eastern part was finished by the Chenghua Emperor (r. 1464–1487). The wall was constructed using a variety of materials, including 490 km of packed earth, 140 km of stone, and 85 km of wood. The remaining sections were made up of natural barriers, such as mountains. However, today, very little of the Great Wall remains in Liaoning. It was not until 1989 that the ruins of the Hushan Wall, the easternmost part of the Great Wall, were discovered.

Many texts do not mention the Liaodong Garrison Wall, and instead wrongly attribute the Shanhai Pass as the eastern end of the Ming Great Wall. This is because the Qing dynasty, which did not want to acknowledge the Liaoning Wall as it was built to protect China against the Manchus.

To the west, the Liaodong Garrison bordered the Jizhou Garrison.
