= Qianxi County, Hebei =

Qianxi County 迁西县
- County
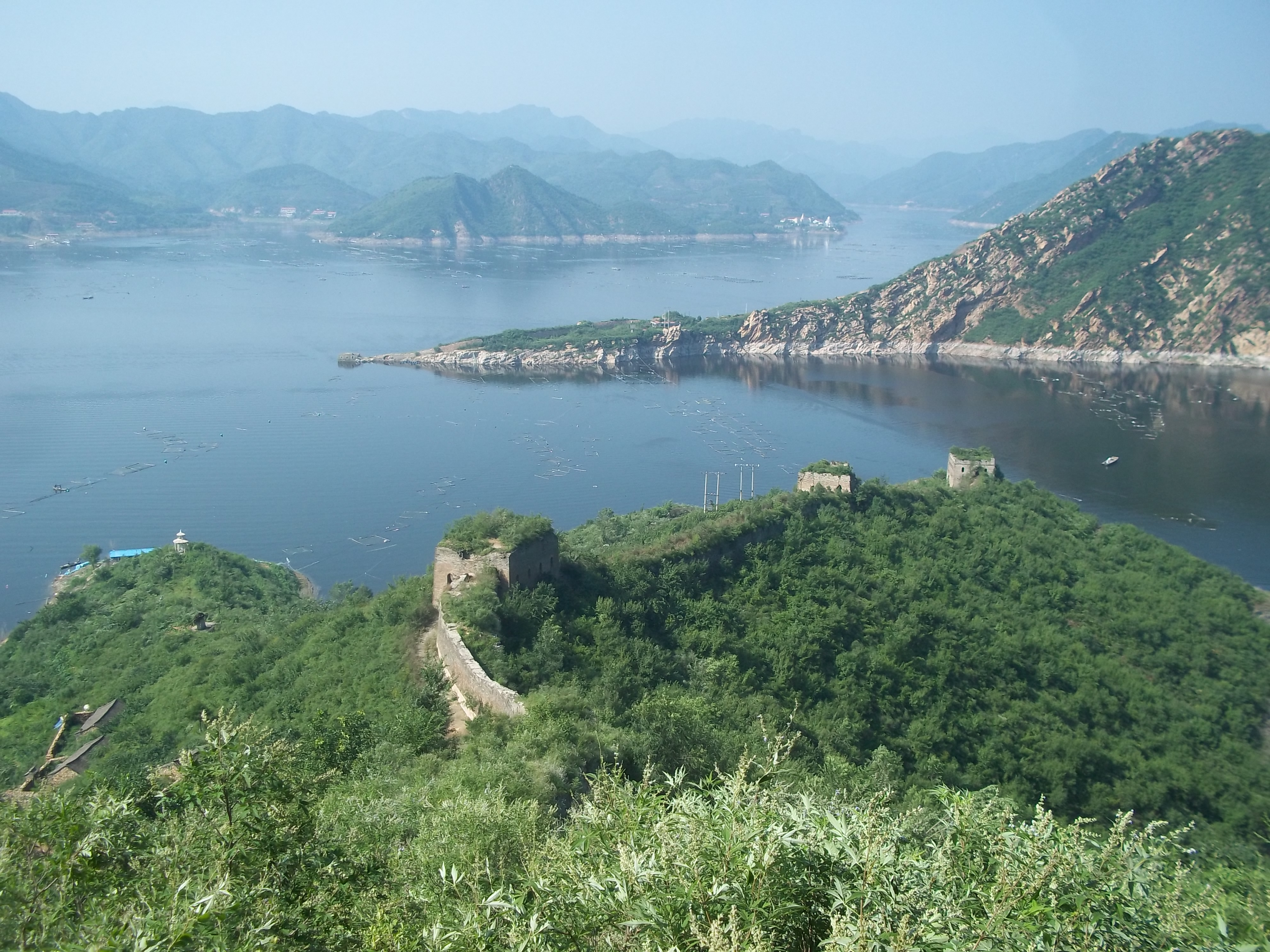

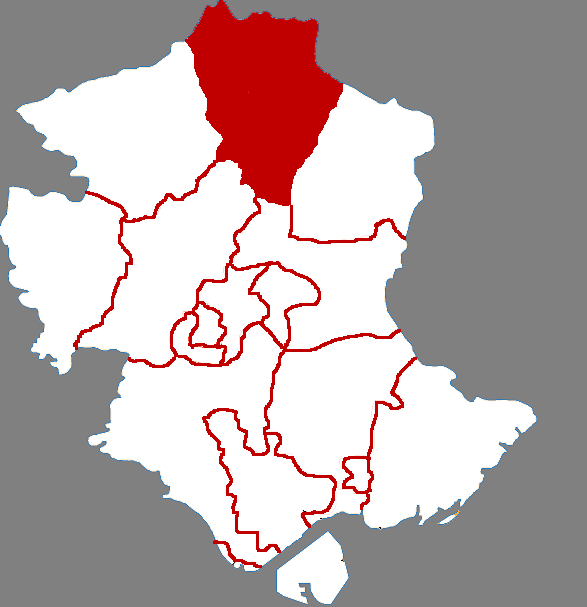
- The location of Qianxi County in Tangshan City, China

- Location of the seat in Hebei
- Coordinates: 40°08′28″N 118°18′54″E
- Country: People's Republic of China
- Province: Hebei
- Prefecture-level city: Tangshan

Area
  - Total: 1,439 km^{2} (556 sq mi)

Population (2020 census)
  - Total: 365,615
  - Density: 254.1/km^{2} (658.1/sq mi)
- Time zone: UTC+8 (China Standard)
- Website: qianxi.tangshan.gov.cn

Qianxi County (simplified Chinese: 迁西县; traditional Chinese: 遷西縣; pinyin: Qiānxī Xiàn) is a county of Hebei province, China. It is northernmost county-level city of Tangshan city.

Spanning an area of 1,439 square kilometres (556 sq mi), Qianxi County is largely agricultural, despite being part of the Jing-Jin-Ji metro region.

Qianxi is known for its chestnuts, producing a third of China's chestnuts export. The history of chestnut cultivation in Qianxi goes back 2,000 years.

Some of the oldest dated rock formation are found in Qianxi as part of the Qianxi stage.

== History ==
The area of contemporary Qianxi County has long been inhabited by humans. The Xizhai site, a Neolithic archeological site, is located within the county.

A number of brick kilns used in the construction of the Ming Great Wall are located within Qianxi County.

The area saw major fighting during the Japanese invasion of China, involving a number of Chinese generals such as Song Zheyuan and Zhang Zizhong.

== Geography ==
Qianxi County is located at the southern foothills of the Yan Mountains, near to the Great Wall. The area is mostly rural, and 63% of the county is forested, the second largest proportion among county-level divisions in Hebei.

== Climate ==
Climate data for Qianxi, elevation 132 m (433 ft), (1991–2020 normals, extremes 1981–present)
Month	Jan	Feb	Mar	Apr	May	Jun	Jul	Aug	Sep	Oct	Nov	Dec	Year
Record high °C (°F)	12.6 (54.7)	19.3 (66.7)	26.9 (80.4)	32.2 (90.0)	37.5 (99.5)	37.9 (100.2)	40.6 (105.1)	35.9 (96.6)	36.6 (97.9)	30.5 (86.9)	21.7 (71.1)	13.7 (56.7)	40.6 (105.1)
Mean daily maximum °C (°F)	0.9 (33.6)	4.2 (39.6)	12.2 (54.0)	19.9 (67.8)	26.5 (79.7)	29.7 (85.5)	30.7 (87.3)	30.1 (86.2)	26.1 (79.0)	18.9 (66.0)	9.8 (49.6)	2.1 (35.8)	17.6 (63.7)
Daily mean °C (°F)	−5.4 (22.3)	−2.2 (28.0)	5.5 (41.9)	13.4 (56.1)	19.9 (67.8)	23.5 (74.3)	25.6 (78.1)	24.7 (76.5)	19.6 (67.3)	11.8 (53.2)	3.4 (38.1)	−3.8 (25.2)	11.3 (52.4)
Mean daily minimum °C (°F)	−10.4 (13.3)	−7.5 (18.5)	−0.7 (30.7)	7.0 (44.6)	13.0 (55.4)	17.8 (64.0)	21.3 (70.3)	20.4 (68.7)	14.4 (57.9)	6.2 (43.2)	−1.6 (29.1)	−8.4 (16.9)	6.0 (42.7)
Record low °C (°F)	−20.8 (−5.4)	−18.4 (−1.1)	−11.2 (11.8)	−2.7 (27.1)	4.2 (39.6)	9.6 (49.3)	14.9 (58.8)	11.9 (53.4)	3.3 (37.9)	−5.2 (22.6)	−15.0 (5.0)	−20.3 (−4.5)	−20.8 (−5.4)
Average precipitation mm (inches)	3.1 (0.12)	3.8 (0.15)	8.1 (0.32)	24.8 (0.98)	46.1 (1.81)	96.5 (3.80)	221.9 (8.74)	154.5 (6.08)	52.3 (2.06)	30.5 (1.20)	12.9 (0.51)	3.5 (0.14)	658 (25.91)
Average precipitation days (≥ 0.1 mm)	2.0	2.2	2.8	5.1	6.9	10.9	13.5	10.9	6.7	4.9	3.1	2.4	71.4
Average snowy days	3.1	2.9	1.7	0.4	0	0	0	0	0	0.1	2.2	3.1	13.5
Average relative humidity (%)	51	48	44	44	50	64	75	76	70	64	59	54	58
Mean monthly sunshine hours	171.9	175.6	218.3	229.7	255.8	209.5	170.9	198.8	205.0	195.1	162.7	160.8	2,354.1
Percentage possible sunshine	57	58	59	57	57	47	38	47	56	57	55	56	54
Source: China Meteorological Administration October all-time Record

== Administrative divisions ==
Qianxi County administers 1 subdistrict, 12 towns, 5 townships, and 1 township-level industrial zone.

=== Subdistrict ===
The county's only subdistrict is Lixiang Subdistrict (栗乡街道).

=== Towns ===
The county's twelve towns are Xingcheng (兴城镇), Jinchangyu (金厂峪镇), Saheqiao (洒河桥镇), Taipingzhai (太平寨镇), Luojiatun (罗家屯镇), Donghuangyu (东荒峪镇), Xinji (新集镇), Santunying (三屯营镇), Luanyang (滦阳镇), Han'erzhuang (汉儿庄镇), Xinzhuangzi (新庄子镇), and Donglianhuayuan (东莲花院镇).

=== Townships ===
The county's five townships are Baimiaozi Township (白庙子乡), Shangying Township (上营乡), Yuhuzhai Township (渔户寨乡), Jiucheng Township (旧城乡), and Yinzhuang Township (尹庄乡).

=== Other ===
Qianxi County also administers the Lixiang Industrial Industry Cluster (Chinese: 栗乡工业产业聚集区) as a township-level division.

== Economy ==
The county had a total gross domestic product of 32.1 billion renminbi as of 2019, of which, 21.1 billion renminbi came from the county's secondary sector.

The area has large iron ore deposits, and a significant steel industry.

The county is a significant rural tourism destination, with major scenic spots including Jingzhong Mountain (Chinese: 景忠山) and Qingshan Pass (Chinese: 青山关).
