= Ai River (Dandong) =

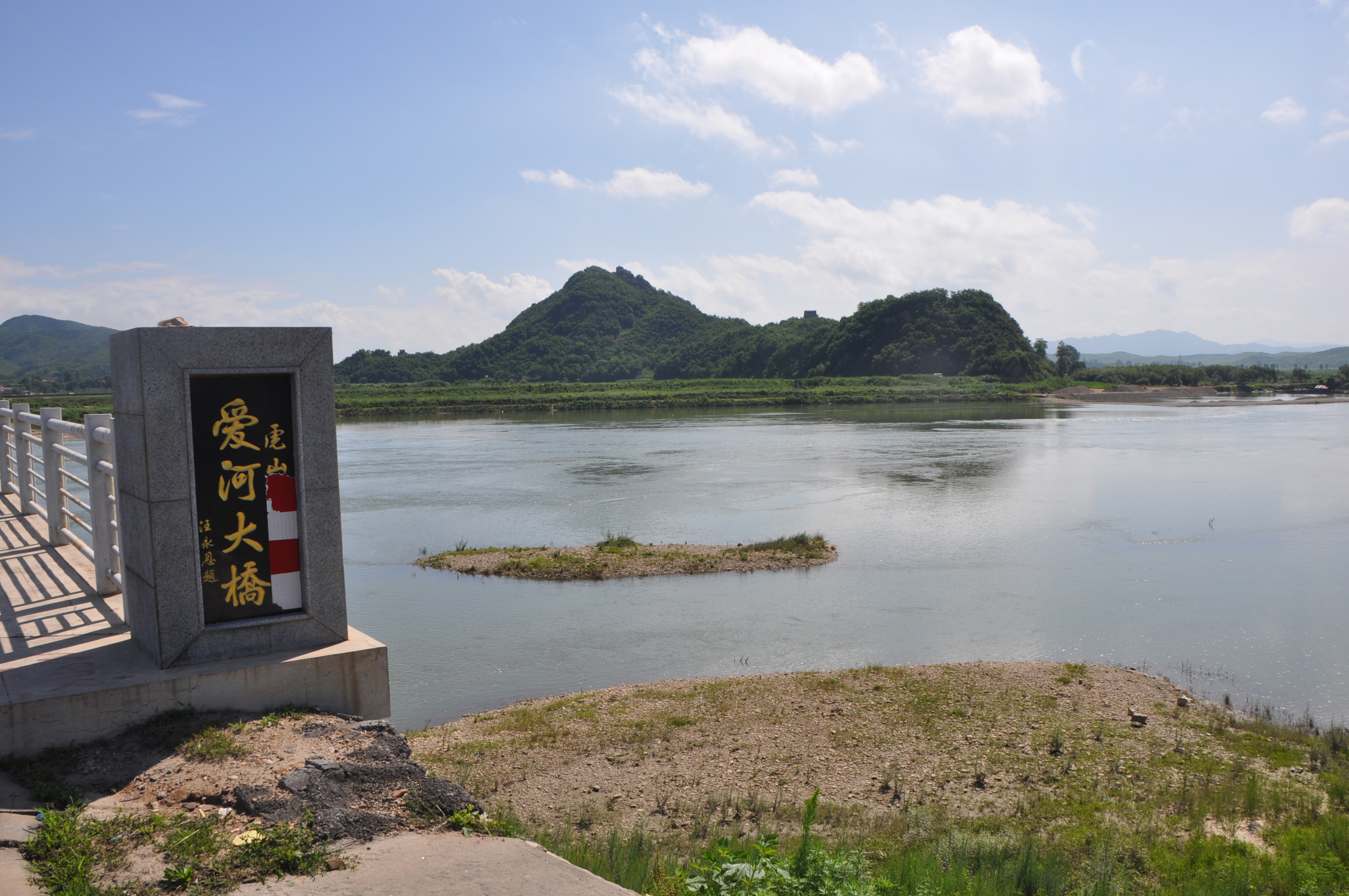
- The Ai River at the Ai River Bridge on Provincial Highway 319, with the Hushan Great Wall in the back]

Location
- Country: China
- Province: Dangdong, Liaoning

Physical characteristics
- Mouth: Yalu River
  - coordinates: 40°12′15″N 124°30′13″E

Basin features
- River system: Yalu River

The Ai River (traditional Chinese: 璦河; simplified Chinese: 瑷河, also traditional Chinese: 愛河; simplified Chinese: 爱河; originally traditional Chinese: 靉河; simplified Chinese: 叆河 and Chinese: 烏骨江 in the Tang dynasty) in Dangdong, Liaoning, China, is the largest tributary on the right (Chinese) side of the Yalu River that flows between China and North Korea. It starts in the mountains of Kuandian Manchu Autonomous County, runs 182 kilometers (113 mi) through Fengcheng City and Zhen'an District, and empties into the Yalu River at Jiulianshan, just south of the Hushan Great Wall.
