= Majiadian =

Majiadian (马家店镇) may refer to the following locations in China:

- Majiadian, Liaoning
- Majiadian, Tianjin, in Baodi District
