= Liaoning Coastal Economic Belt =

Group of prefectures in Liaoning, China

The Liaoning Coastal Economic Belt (short: Liaoning Belt, Chinese: 辽宁沿海经济带) is a group of prefectures in Liaoning province in Northeast China. The region was defined for the purpose of a national economic development strategy of China, aiming to strengthen the region as access point of Northeast China to the sea and a vital economic gateway to Northeast Asia and other regions in the world. Specifically, the six port cities with Dalian as the center are to be built as an international shipping center for northeast Asia. Infrastructure conditions including navigation capacity and logistics systems will be particularly improved for better service.

== Region ==
The Liaoning Coastal Economic Belt includes all six prefectural cities flanking the Yellow Sea and the Bohai Bay: Dalian, Dandong, Jinzhou, Yingkou, Panjin and Huludao. This Belt has a coastline of nearly 3,000 kilometers and a land area of almost 58,000 square kilometers. More than 17.8 million people live here, they created about 45 percent of the total GDP of Liaoning in 2008.

== Focus of development ==
Upgrading the industrial structure in the Liaoning Belt is focusing on development of major industrial clusters, such as

- Advanced equipment manufacturing
- Shipbuilding
- Raw material processing
- Bio-pharmaceuticals
- Alternative energy

Also, the service sector is developing fast, from innovation in financial services by establishing public information platforms, to international competitive software development as a base of outsourcing industry. Another focus is on high-quality farming and processing of food and other agricultural products, such as sea food, rice, fruits, vegetables, and flowers.

== Sustainability ==
The Liaoning Belt strategy is also ambitious to develop this area into a place where citizens can live and work comfortably and build a moderately affluent society. Cleaner production is promoted in the industrial process and natural conservation along the sea and inland are important elements of the strategy. Foreign investment is particularly encouraged for hi-tech industries, the service sector, advanced manufacturing, infrastructure construction and ecological protection.

The Liaoning Belt is one of the promising regions in China. Its development strategy is adopted in Liaoning as guideline for the next 10-year development. It is important for China to have the zone as a good example for revitalizing traditional industrial areas, similar to the Ruhr Area in Germany.
