= Majiadian, Liaoning =

Majiadian 马家店镇
- Town
- Location in China
- Coordinates: 39°58′02″N 123°52′31″E
- Country: China
- Province: Liaoning
- Prefecture-level city: Dandong
- County-level city: Donggang

Area
  - Total: 130.6 km^{2} (50.4 sq mi)

Population (2010)
  - Total: 25,999
- Time zone: UTC+8 (China Standard Time)

Majiadian (simplified Chinese: 马家店镇; traditional Chinese: 馬家店鎮; pinyin: Mǎjiādiàn Zhèn) is a town located in the county-level city of Donggang, in Dandong, Liaoning, China. It is located approximately 30 kilometres (19 mi) from Donggang's urban center.

It has an area of 130.6 square kilometres (50.4 mi^{2}), and a population of 25,999 as of 2010. The economy is based on agriculture and fruit production.

== Administrative divisions ==
Majiadian administers the following 14 administrative villages:

- Youfang Village (Chinese: 油坊村)
- Shuangshandong Village (Chinese: 双山东村)
- Shuangshanxi Village (Chinese: 双山西村)
- Sanjiazi Village (Chinese: 三家子村)
- Taiping Village (Chinese: 太平村)
- Liujiadian Village (Chinese: 刘家店村)
- Zhushan Village (Chinese: 珠山村)
- Lijiatun Village (Chinese: 李家屯村)
- Sandaogang Village (Chinese: 三道岗村)
- Daijiagang Village (Chinese: 代家岗村)
- Wangjiagang Village (Chinese: 王家岗村)
- Majiadian Village (Chinese: 马家店村)
- Xijianshan Village (Chinese: 西尖山村)
- Tangjiabao Village (Chinese: 唐家堡村)

== See also ==
- List of township-level divisions of Liaoning
