= Ming Great Wall =

Sections of the Great Wall of China built during the Ming dynasty (1368-1644)

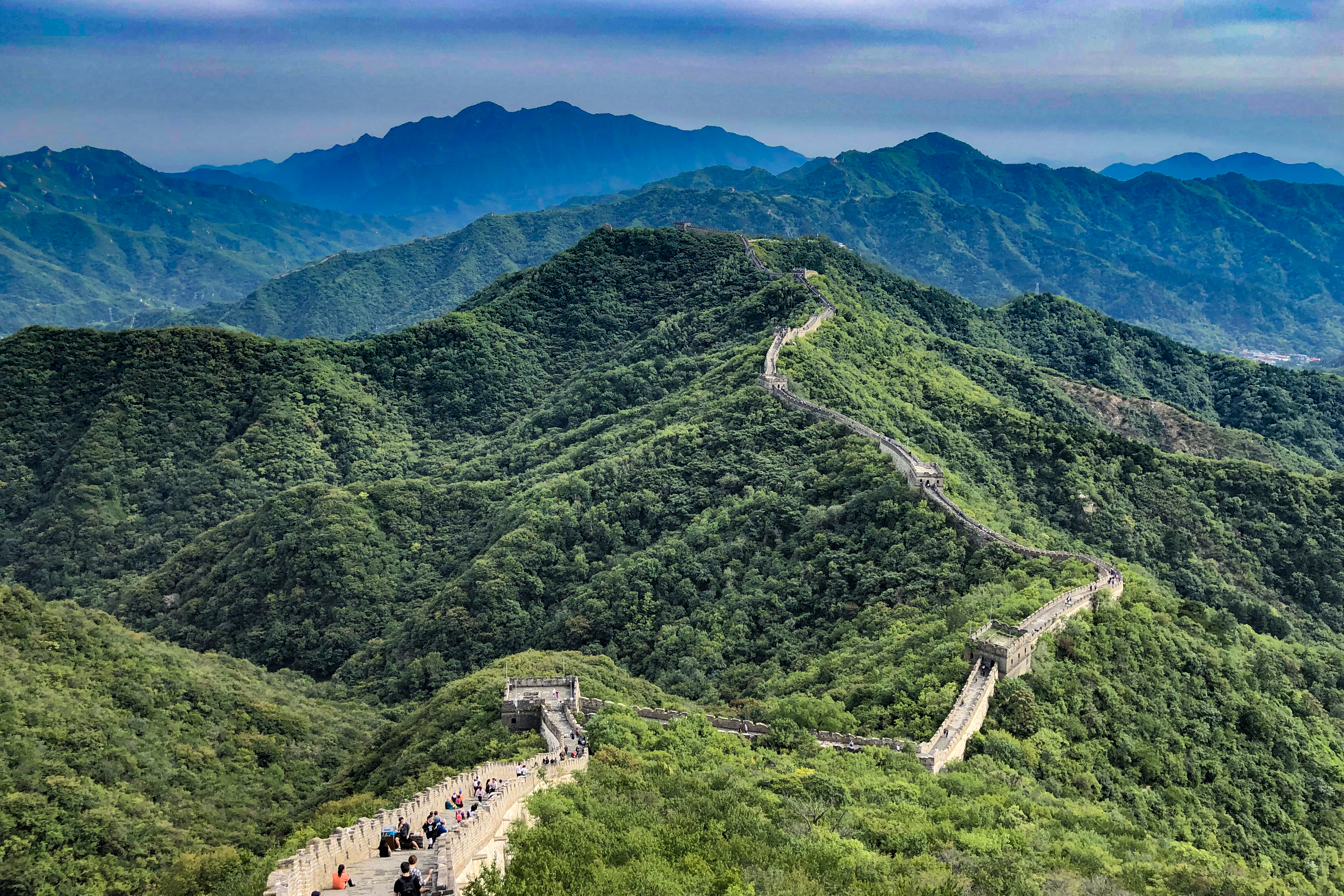
The Great Wall at Mutianyu. This and many other famous sections of the Great Wall were originally built during the Ming dynasty.

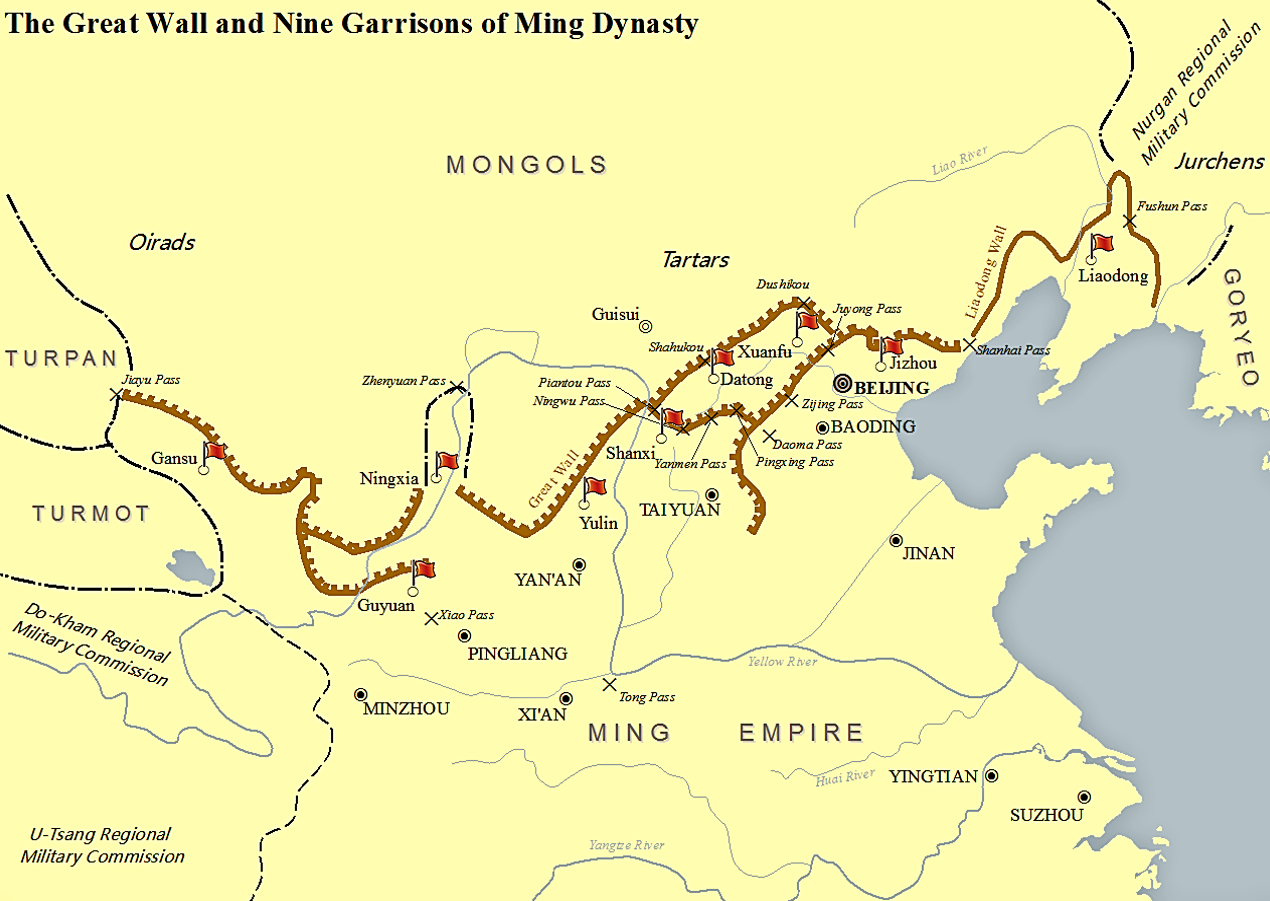
The extent of the Ming dynasty and its walls, which formed most of what is called the Great Wall of China today

The Ming Great Wall (Chinese: 明長城; pinyin: Míng Chángchéng), built by the Ming dynasty (1368–1644), forms the most visible parts of the Great Wall of China today. A comprehensive archaeological survey, using advanced technology has concluded that the Ming walls measure 8,850 km (5,500 mi) from Jiayu Pass in the west to the sea in Shanhai Pass, then looping over to terminate in Manchuria at the Hushan Great Wall. This is made up of 6,259 km (3,889 mi) sections of actual wall, 359 km (223 mi) of trenches and 2,232 km (1,387 mi) of natural defensive barriers such as hills and rivers.

While the Ming walls are generally referred to as "Great Wall" (changcheng) in modern times, in Ming times they were called "border barriers" (邊牆; bianqiang) by the Chinese, since the term changcheng was said to evoke imagery of the tyranny of Qin Shi Huang (260–210 BC) and was associated with the Qin Great Wall.

== History ==
=== Early Ming walls and garrisons ===
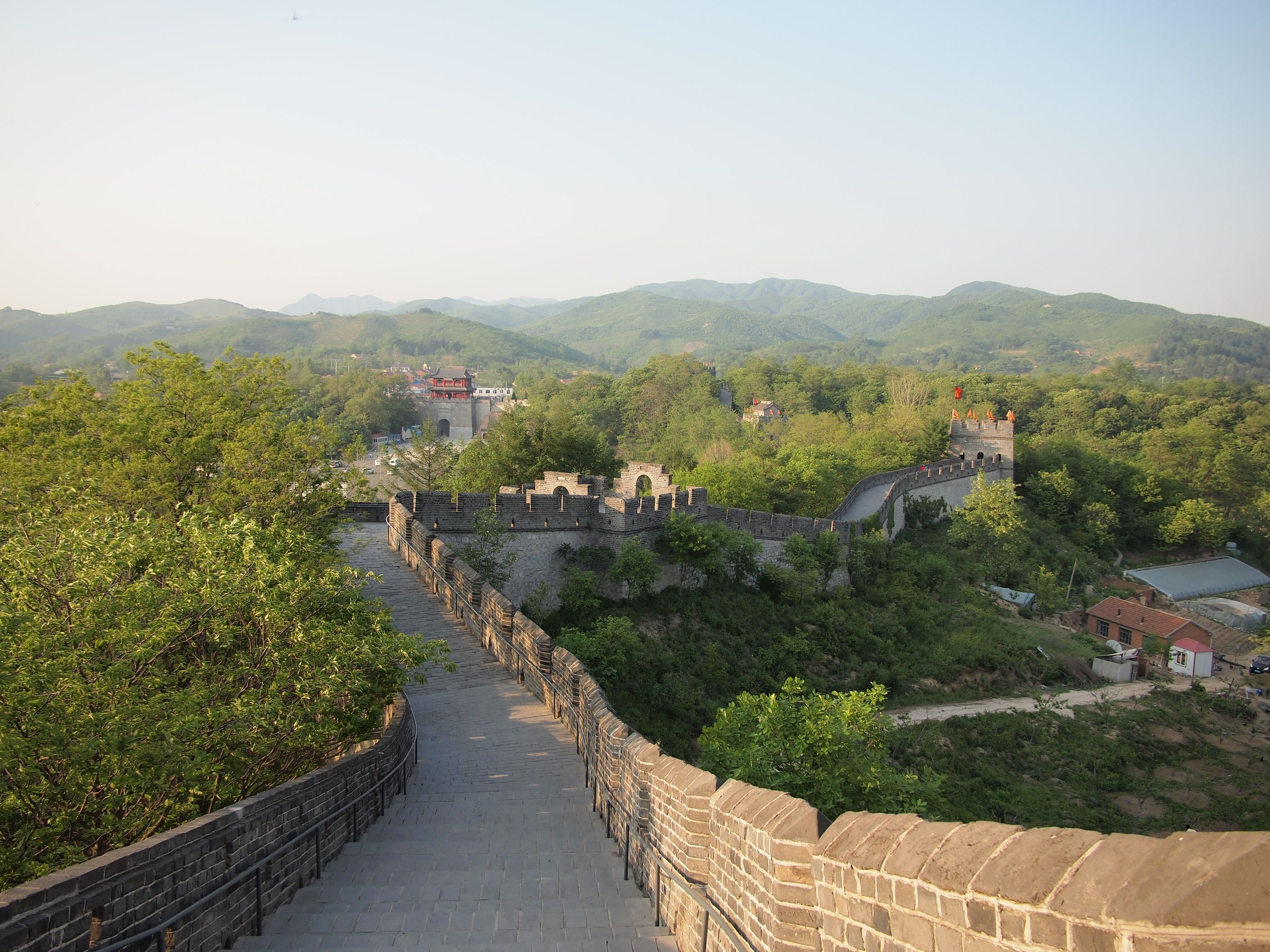
Hushan Great Wall, the eastmost point of Ming Great Wall, on the bank of Yalu River in Liaoning province

In 1368, the Hongwu Emperor (Zhu Yuanzhang, r. 1368–98) ousted the Mongol-led Yuan dynasty from China to inaugurate the Ming dynasty. The Mongols fled back to Mongolia to form the Northern Yuan, but even after numerous campaigns, the Ming failed to expand further north and west.

In the early years of his reign, Hongwu envisioned a border policy where mobile armies along the northern frontier guarded the safety of China. To this end he set up the "eight outer garrisons" close to the steppe and an inner line of forts more suitable for defence. The inner line was the forerunner to the Ming Great Wall. In 1373, as Ming forces encountered setbacks, Hongwu put more emphasis on defence and adopted Hua Yunlong's (華雲龍) suggestion to establish garrisons at 130 passes and other strategic points in the Beijing area. More positions were set up in the years up to Hongwu's death in 1398, and watchtowers were manned from the Bohai Sea to Beijing and further onto the Mongolian steppes. These positions, however, were not for a linear defence but rather a regional one in which walls did not feature heavily, and offensive tactics remained the overarching policy at the time.

Hongwu's son, the Yongle Emperor (r. 1402–24), continued his father's policy of active campaigning against the Mongols, and in 1421 moved the Ming capital from Nanjing in the south to Beijing in the north, partially to better manage the Mongol situation. Construction of walls in stone and earth began under Yongle's reign in strategic passes, when signal towers and ditch systems were also established. Yongle's reign also saw the rearrangement of the dynasty's frontiers that led to all but one of the eight outer garrisons being abolished to cut expenses, thereby sacrificing a vital foothold in the steppe transitional zone. After Yongle's death in 1424, the Ming abandoned the last garrison at Kaiping (the former Yuan capital also known as Shangdu) in 1430. The removal of these garrisons would have long-term consequences, as Ming foreign policy turned increasingly inward and defence became preferred over offence, especially after taking into consideration the cost to maintain the outlying garrisons.

Around 1442, a wall was erected by the Ming in Liaodong to protect Han settlers from a possible threat from the Jurched-Mongol Oriyanghan. In 1467–68, expansion of the wall provided further protection for the region from against attacks by the Jianzhou Jurchens in the northeast. An offshoot of the future main Great Wall line, this "Liaodong Wall" was of simple design: for the most part constructed by pouring mud between parallel rows of stakes, with moats dug on both sides, although stones and tiles were used in some parts.

Despite withdrawal from the steppe, the Ming military remained in a strong position until the Tumu Crisis in 1449, which caused the collapse of the early Ming security system. Over half of the campaigning Chinese army perished in the conflict, while the Mongols captured the Zhengtong Emperor Zhu Qizhen. This military debacle shattered the Ming dynasty military might and momentum that had given pause to the Mongols since the beginning of the dynasty, and the Ming were on the defensive from this point on.

In the immediate aftermath of the disaster, the most pressing political concern caused by the capture of the emperor was resolved when the acting Minister of War Yu Qian (the actual minister having died at Tumu) installed the Emperor's brother as the new Jingtai Emperor (r. 1450–1459). Military tensions with the Oirats remained high during Jingtai's reign, as peace would have caused a great deal of political awkwardness for Jingtai and Yu Qian's faction, who benefited from putting Jingtai on the throne. To maintain a military presence while compensating for the loss of soldiers, fortifications, ditches, and ramparts were constructed in key passes, including at Zijing Pass (紫荊關; through where the Mongols had entered during the Tumu Crisis), Ningwu Pass (寧武關), and Juyong Pass. The work undertaken in this period marked a major shift toward defensive construction.

=== The Ordos Wall ===
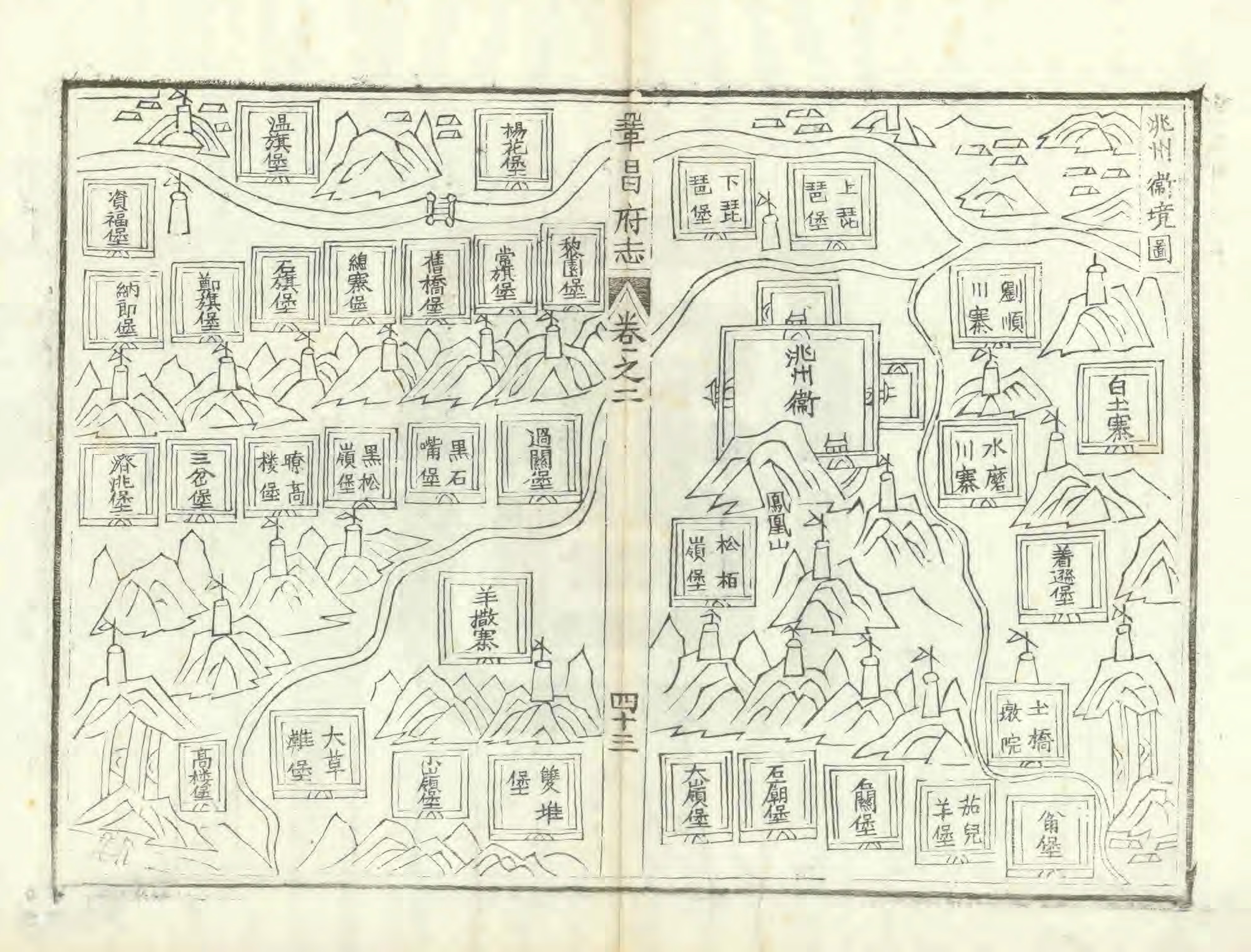
1688 map of Ming dynasty fortresses around Taozhou (present-day Xincheng Town, Lintan County)

The deterioration of the Ming military position in the steppe transitional zone gave rise to nomadic raids into Ming territory, including the crucial Ordos region, on a level unprecedented since the dynasty's founding. To solve this problem, the Ming could either go on the offensive and re-establish their positions in the steppe, or concede the transitional zones to the nomads and maintain a defensive and accommodative policy. Over the late 15th and 16th centuries, the choice between the two options became the subject of fierce debate in the Chinese court and dissension that was sometimes exploited by various political factions to get rid of the opposition. The decision to build the first major Ming walls was one of the outcomes of these debates as an acceptable compromise.

As offensive action against the nomads became increasingly untenable due to a shortage of fighting men and military supplies, Yu Zijun (余子俊; 1429–1489) first proposed constructing a wall in the Ordos region in August 1471, but this went against the traditional offensive-based policies in place since the early Ming. Minister of War Bai Gui (白圭) had tried to implement an offensive solution since taking office in 1467, and he objected to Yu's proposal because of cost fears. On 20 December 1472, amid reports of people fleeing the frontier provinces due to the harsh military levies imposed to finance offensive campaigns, Yu reasoned that his wall project would not be as costly as the offensive strategy, and that the wall would be a temporary measure that would allow the Ming to restore its military and economic strength. The court and emperor approved the plan, and the 1473 victory in the Battle of Red Salt Lake (紅鹽池) by Wang Yue (王越) deterred Mongol invasions long enough for Yu Zijun to complete his wall project in 1474. This wall, a combined effort between Yu Zijun and Wang Yue, stretched from present day Hengcheng (橫城) in Lingwu (northwestern Ningxia province) to Huamachi town (花馬池鎮) in Yanchi County, and from there to Qingshuiying (清水營) in northeastern Shaanxi, a total of more than 2000 li (about 1,100 kilometres (680 mi)) long. Along its length were 800 strong points, sentry posts, beacon-fire towers, and assorted defences. 40,000 men were enlisted for this effort, which was completed in several months at a cost of over one million silver taels. This defence system proved its initial worth in 1482, when a large group of Mongol raiders were trapped within the double lines of fortifications and suffered a defeat by the Ming generals. This was seen as a vindication of Yu Zijun's strategy of wall-building by the people of the border areas. By the mid-16th century, Yu's wall in the Ordos had seen expansion into an extensive defence system. It contained two defence lines: Yu's wall, called the "great border" (大邊, dàbiān), and a "secondary border" (二邊, èrbiān) built by Yang Yiqing (1454–1530) behind it.

Following the success of the Ordos walls, Yu Zijun proposed construction of a further wall that would extend from the Yellow River bend in the Ordos to the Sihaiye Pass (四海冶口; in present-day Yanqing County) near the capital Beijing, running a distance of more than 1300 li (about 700 kilometres (430 mi)). The project received approval in 1485, but Yu's political enemies harped on the cost overruns and forced Yu to scrap the project and retire the same year. For more than 50 years after Yu's resignation, political struggle prevented major wall constructions on a scale comparable to Yu's Ordos project.

However, wall construction continued regardless of court politics during this time. The Ordos walls underwent extension, elaboration, and repair well into the 16th century.

=== The Walls of Xuanfu–Datong and the western reaches ===
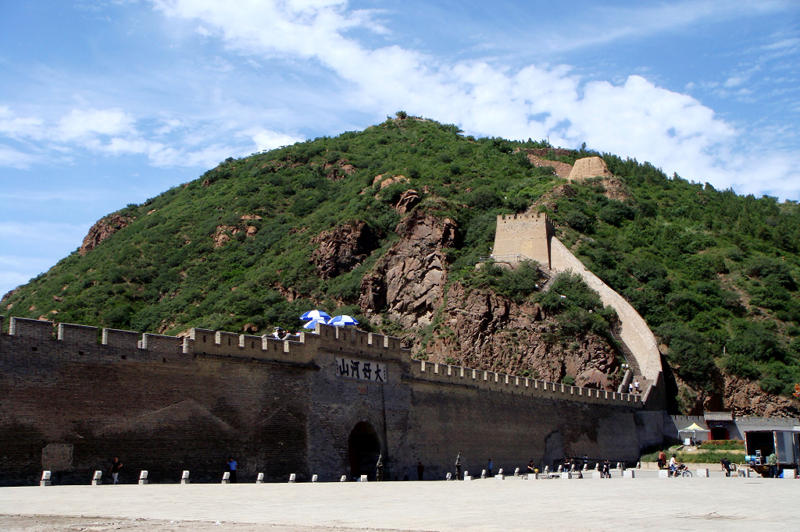
The Great Wall at Dajingmen, part of the Xuanfu stretch of the Great Wall. The gate structure is a Qing dynasty construction.

With the Ordos now adequately fortified, the Mongols avoided its walls by riding east to invade Datong and Xuanfu, which were two major garrisons guarding the corridor to Beijing where no walls had been built. The two defence lines of Xuanfu and Datong left by the Northern Qi and the early Ming had deteriorated by this point, and for all intents and purposes the inner line was the capital's main line of defence. Starting from the 1520s, proposals were made to strengthen the defences of this region, but the plan was disrupted by the local populace's resistance to the prospect of labour; only in the 1540s did work proceed in earnest.

From 1544 to 1549, a defensive building program took place on a scale unprecedented in Chinese history. The project was led by Weng Wanda (翁萬達; 1498–1552), the Supreme Commander of the Xuan–Da defence area (宣大總督), which was responsible for the Xuanfu, Datong, and Shanxi areas. Troops were re-deployed along the outer line, new walls and beacon towers were constructed, and fortifications were restored and extended along both lines. Firearms and artillery were first mounted on the walls and towers around this time, for both defence and signalling purposes. The project's completion was announced in the sixth month of 1548, but the walls were steadily augmented for a time after that. At its height, the Xuan–Da portion of the Great Wall totalled about 850 kilometres (530 miles) of wall, with some sections being doubled-up with two lines of wall, some tripled or even quadrupled. The outer frontier was now protected by a wall called the "outer border" (外邊, wàibiān) that extended 380 kilometres (240 mi) from the Yellow River's edge at the Piantou Pass (偏頭關) along the Inner Mongolia border with Shanxi into Hebei province; the "inner border" wall (內邊, nèibiān) ran southeast from Piantou Pass for some 400 kilometres (250 mi), ending at the Pingxing Pass; a "river wall" (河邊, hébiān) also ran from the Piantou Pass and followed the Yellow River southwards for about 70 kilometres (43 mi). The Hebei section of the Great Wall was further fortified by planting trees along the wall.

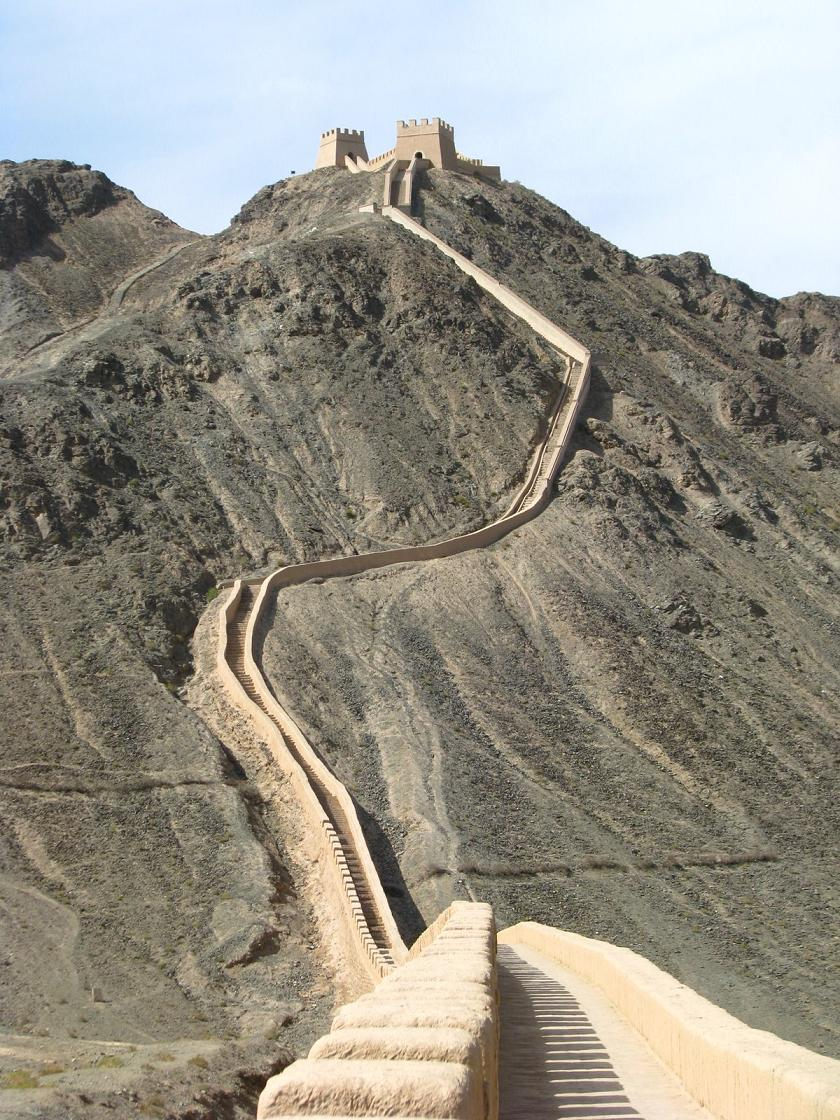
A section of the Great Wall on the Hanging Cliffs (懸壁長城) leading up to Jiayu Pass

As with Yu Zijun's wall in the Ordos, the Mongols shifted their attacks away from the newly strengthened Xuan–Da sector to less well-protected areas. In the west, Shaanxi province became the target of nomads riding west from the Yellow River loop. The westernmost fortress of Ming China, the Jiayu Pass, saw substantial enhancement with walls starting in 1539, and from there border walls were built discontinuously down the Gansu Corridor to Wuwei, where the low earthen wall split into two. The northern section passed through Zhongwei and Yinchuan, where it met the western edge of the Yellow River loop before connecting with the Ordos walls, while the southern section passed through Lanzhou and continued northeast to Dingbian. The origins and the exact route of this so-called "Tibetan loop" are still not clear.

In the east, the Tümed Mongols under Altan Khan raided Sihaiye and Dabaiyang (大白陽) in the seventh month of 1548. These points were much further east than previous raids and much closer to Beijing. The terrain there proved difficult to traverse, and so fortifications were not seen as urgently needed before the raids. In response, Weng Wanda proposed to close the gaps by connecting the walls of Xuan–Da with the signal towers of the eastern Jizhou defence command (薊州鎮). Only one sixth of the 436,000 liang of silver demanded for this project was allotted, and Weng Wanda supervised only briefly before leaving office on the death of his father.

=== The Great Wall outside Beijing ===
In 1550, having once more been refused a request for trade, Altan Khan invaded the Xuan–Da region. However, despite several attempts, he could not take Xuanfu due to Weng Wanda's double fortified line while the garrison at Datong bribed him to not attack there. Instead of continuing to operate in the area, he circled around Weng Wanda's wall to the relatively lightly defended Gubeikou, northeast of Beijing. From there Altan Khan passed through the defences and raided the suburbs of Beijing. The Ming court put up minimal resistance and watched the suburbs burn as they waited for reinforcements to drive the invaders out. According to one contemporary source, the raid took more than 60,000 lives and an additional 40,000 people became prisoners. As a response to this raid, the focus of the Ming's northern defences shifted from the Xuan–Da region to the Jizhou and Changping Defence Commands (grouped and abbreviated as Ji–Chang) where the breach took place. Later in the same year, the dry-stone walls of the Ji–Chang area were replaced by stone and mortar. These allowed the Chinese to build on steeper, more easily defended slopes and facilitated construction of features such as ramparts, crenelations, and peepholes. The effectiveness of the new walls was demonstrated in the failed Mongol raid of 1554, where raiders expecting a repeat of the events of 1550 were surprised by the higher wall and stiff Chinese resistance.

The success of the wall did not always translate into political success for its builders. Detractors cited its high costs and the drain on military manpower as reasons for their opposition and in 1557 the Grand Coordinator Wu Jiahui (吳嘉會) was jailed on charges of embezzlement due to faulty and wasteful wall-building. Construction thereafter had to be low-key: the Supreme Commander of Shanxi (山西總督), Liu Tao (劉燾), minimized political attention to himself by claiming that he was "building through non-building."

In 1567 Qi Jiguang and Tan Lun, successful generals who fended off the Jiajing wokou raids, were reassigned to manage the Ji–Chang Defense Commands and step up the defences of the capital region. They submitted an ambitious proposal to build 3,000 brick towers along the Great Wall, and manoeuvred their way out of political opposition through the efforts of their allies at the imperial court. Although the number of towers was later scaled back to 1200, the project, which started in 1569 and lasted two years, marked the first large-scale use of hollow watchtowers on the Wall. Up until this point, most previous towers along the Great Wall had been solid, with a small hut on top for a sentry to take shelter from the elements and Mongol arrows. In contrast, the Ji–Chang towers built from 1569 onwards were hollow brick structures, allowing soldiers interior space to live, store food and water, stockpile weapons, and take shelter from Mongol arrows.

Altan Khan eventually made peace with China when it opened border cities for trade in 1571, alleviating the Mongol need to raid. This, coupled with Qi and Tan's efforts to secure the frontier, brought a period of relative peace along the border. However, minor raids still happened from time to time when the profits of raiding outweighed the profits of trade, and so wall-building continued.

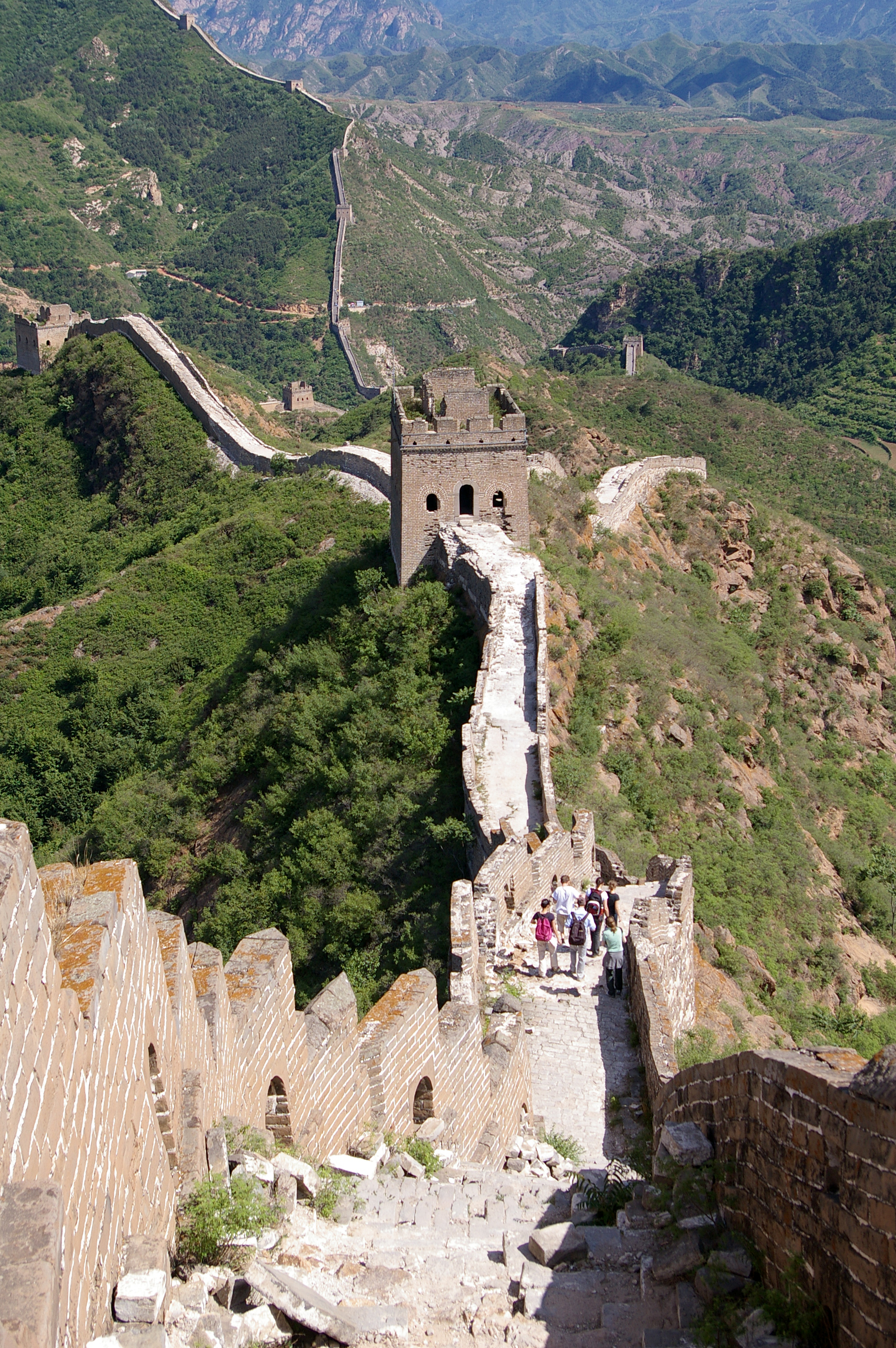
The "Stairway to Heaven" stretch of the Simatai Great Wall runs through precipitous terrain. Reinforced after the raid of 1576 so as to "not let a single horse in" (匹馬不入), as noted by a Ming official.

On 6 July 1576, a minor Mongol raid broke through a small gap in the Wall and resulted in the death of several high ranking border officials in the vicinity of Simatai, 8 miles (13 km) east of Gubeikou. After this incident and starting in 1577, the Ming became committed to closing all gaps along the frontier around Beijing whilst strengthening the walls. As a result, the earthen defences around Beijing were torn down and replaced by ones built with stone bricks and sanhetu (三合土), an early sort of concrete made of lime, clay tiles, and sand. Areas of difficult terrain once considered impassable were also walled off, leading to the well-known vistas of a stone-faced Great Wall snaking over dramatic landscapes that tourists still see today.

Except for a lull in the 1590s due to resources being diverted to deal with the Japanese invasions of Korea, wall construction continued until the demise of the Ming dynasty in 1644.

=== The Wall and the fall of the Ming ===
The last decades of the Ming saw famines, floods, economic chaos, rebellions, and invasions. In 1618, the upstart Jianzhou Jurchen leader Nurhaci united the tribes of Manchuria and declared war on the Ming. After the Fushun garrison within the Liaodong Wall surrendered to Nurhaci the next year, the Ming court assembled a Chinese–Korean army numbering above 100,000 men to contain him, but they were catastrophically defeated at the Battle of Sarhu. Nurhaci made substantial progress in his conquest of Liaodong until he was mortally wounded at the 1626 Battle of Ningyuan by Yuan Chonghuan. He was succeeded by his son Hung Taiji, who worked to undermine Yuan Chonghuan by spreading rumours of Yuan's collaboration with the Jurchens. To drive the point home, Hung Taiji sent an army around Ningyuan through Mongol territories to breach the Great Wall pass at Xifengkou in the fall of 1629, taking advantage of a rift in the Ming ranks due to Yuan Chonghuan's execution of his fellow commander Mao Wenlong. This breach, known as the Jisi Incident, was the first time the Jurchens had broken through the Great Wall into China proper since the troubles in the northeast began. Yuan Chonghuan hastily sent an army to drive off the raiders from the walls of Beijing, but political damage had already been done. Yuan Chonghuan was accused of treason for letting this happen, and in 1630 he was executed by slow dismemberment while his family were exterminated or exiled.

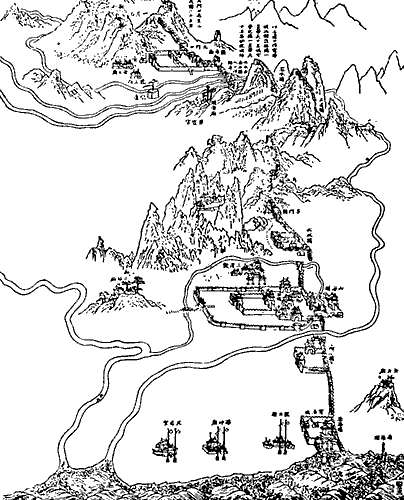
Illustration of the Shanhai Pass garrison at the time of the Manchu conquests

Following Hung Taiji's raid, regular garrison troops in the western defence zones along the Great Wall were sent east to defend the capital, which had the unintended consequence of instigating more instability. The regions of Shaanxi had already been afflicted by adverse weather, heavy taxation, and fiscal mismanagement, so the removal of a substantial military presence encouraged the inhabitants to turn to banditry and rebellion; the remaining garrison forces, already unpaid and resentful, saw little choice but to throw in their lot with the rebels. A prominent leader who rose from the ranks of the rebels was Li Zicheng, the self-titled "Dashing Prince" (闖王, Chuǎng Wáng) who came to dominate Central China by 1642. Throughout his rise there were several occasions on which he could have been extinguished by the Ming, but Jurchen breaches of the Great Wall – the Jurchens had raided across the Great Wall several times since 1629, including in 1634, 1638, and 1642 – distracted the Ming court's attention. The Ming were not able to effectively deal with the simultaneous internal and external threats, much less maintain a consistent defence along the Great Wall. In 1635 Hung Taiji renamed his people the Manchus and declared himself the emperor of a new Qing dynasty the following year. However, the Manchus were not yet willing to launch an invasion of conquest against the Ming; as Hung Taiji remarked in 1642, "The Shanhai Pass cannot be taken."

In the first months of 1644, Li Zicheng, having consolidated control over his home province Shaanxi, declared himself the founder of a new Shun dynasty, and marched against the Ming court in Beijing. His invasion route brought the Shun army along the Great Wall to neutralize its heavily fortified garrisons. In this effort Li was met with next to no resistance as most garrisons surrendered to the Shun with no major fighting, except at the Ningwu Pass where the general Zhou Yuji (周遇吉) fought to the death. By April 17, both the major garrisons at Datong and Xuanfu had surrendered to Li Zicheng, and most Ming hopes were placed on the last Great Wall pass at Juyong and its defender Tang Tong (唐通). However, just as the Ming court was discussing the means of increasing provisions to Juyong Pass, it received word that Tang Tong had surrendered and let the Shun army through on April 21. With all options exhausted, the Ming's Chongzhen Emperor hanged himself as the Shun army entered Beijing on April 25, 1644.

The largest remaining Ming fighting force in North China at the time of Beijing's fall was Wu Sangui's 40,000-man frontier force, who had abandoned the Ningyuan garrison to come to the emperor's aid. Halfway to Beijing, Wu received news of Chongzhen's death, so he went back to garrison the Shanhai Pass, the eastern terminus of the main Great Wall line. He and his men were now caught between the rebels within the Great Wall and the Manchus without. After some deliberation, Wu Sangui decided to resist the new Shun regime, having heard that Li Zicheng had ordered Wu's family executed. On May 3 and May 10 Wu Sangui twice defeated the Shun vanguard led by the turncoat Tang Tong, but he knew that his force alone was insufficient to fight Li Zicheng's main army. Wu Sangui wrote to the Manchus for help, promising "great profits" if they assisted him in defeating the rebels. The Manchu prince-regent Dorgon (Hung Taiji had died in 1643) determined that this was the opportunity to claim the Mandate of Heaven for the Qing. Dorgon made clear in his reply that the Manchus would help Wu Sangui, but Wu would have to submit to the Qing; Wu had little choice but to accept.

On May 27, as the Shun army approached the Shanhai Pass from the south, Wu Sangui opened the gates to let the Qing army through the pass from the north. Up to this point the Battle of Shanhai Pass between Li Zicheng and Wu Sangui had been moving in Li's favour, but the sudden appearance of the Manchu bannermen decisively routed the Shun forces. Having thus entered through the Great Wall, the Manchus seized Beijing on June 5. They eventually defeated both the rebel-founded Shun dynasty and the remaining Ming resistance, establishing Qing rule over all of China.

== Construction ==
=== The workforce ===
Central policy alone did not decide whether the walls would be built, as various "defense commands" (邊鎮, biānzhèn) along the border possessed considerable autonomy to deal with the nomads, leading to a decentralized approach to wall-building along the frontier. Each wall-building project was designed to meet imminent or potential threats along short sections of the empire's northern border, never larger in scope than a single regional defence command, and were often as short as a few hundred meters. In most cases, frontier policy decisions of this period were made by the supreme commander or the grand coordinator in charge of the defence command, who would then send their proposals to the Ministry of War (兵部, Bīngbù) and the emperor for approval. If approved, funding for the project would be footed by the Ministry of War and the Ministry of Revenue (戶部, Hùbù). In essence, the Ming Great Wall was built in a piecemeal fashion by a number of regional commanders over a long period of time, not as one monumental project ordered by the central government.

There were three main groups of people that made up the builders of the Great Wall during the Ming dynasty: frontier guards, peasants, and convicts. Towards the end of the Ming Great Wall building period, skilled artisans became a prominent group of wall builders as well. During the Ming period, soldiers were in shortage due to low productivity on the military colonies, called weisuo (衛所). The northern frontier, the most heavily guarded border of Ming China, was kept at 40% strength, which was equivalent to 300,000 men across a 2,000 mile border. Because of low productivity on military farms and the need for more guards along the frontier, most of the frontier soldiers were from military families that served on the farms. Soldiers were involved in the building of the Great Wall because Ming officials preferred to fight a defensive war on the northern frontier. This took the form of building fortresses and walls along the frontier to protect the empire from invaders. Therefore, the building of the Great Wall fell on the shoulders of the military. Depending on the military colony and the general in charge, labor could be paid or unpaid. If they were paid, it averaged out to six pounds of silver per man per year. But like peasants and convicts, labor was always conscripted by the government, meaning that the government would force people to work on the wall.

Like previous dynasties, the Ming officials also recruited peasants from the surrounding areas to work on the wall for seasons at a time. Not much is known about how the peasants were recruited or how they worked, but the labor was often conscripted and paid very little.

The last major group of wall builders during the Ming dynasty were convicts. Convicts were the other part of the military that was not conscripted from hereditary military families. At the beginning of the Ming dynasty, only military convicts were sent into frontier exile, but as time went on, civilians convicts were also sent to the frontier. Because Ming officials wanted to create more hereditary military families, unmarried convicts were often given a wife from the female convict population to start a family with.

In addition to these main groups of wall builders, there were also masons who were hired by the emperor to build the more sophisticated parts of the wall that were made of brick and mortar instead of the traditional tamped earth method. These workers were paid significantly more by the emperor because of their specialized skills in wall building, including working with kilns to create the bricks and designing the walls to fit the terrain.

Living and working conditions for the wall builders were miserable and often fatal. Traveling to the Great Wall itself was a dangerous journey that many would die on. This difficult journey would also make supplying the garrisons with food and other supplies extremely difficult. Once at the wall, workers lived in "inhumane conditions" that were rampant with disease, lacked basic needs, and was incredibly dangerous to navigate. These factors, combined with the harsh working climate instituted by the generals in charge of the wall building, lead to a high mortality rate among wall builders, which is why many call the Great Wall "the longest cemetery in the world".

Ming soldiers who had built and guarded the Great Wall were given land nearby for their families to settle down and farm small plots of land. There are altogether 158 such villages. One of these villages in the vicinity of the Great Wall include Chengziyu (城子峪) in Funing District of Hebei. Their ancestors were recruited from the districts of Jinhua and Yiwu in Zhejiang province and had served in the Ming military under Qi Jiguang.

=== Techniques ===
Several techniques were used to build these walls. For materials, the Ming used earth, stone, timber, and lime like previous dynasties. But they also used bricks and tiles, especially for areas with rougher terrain, which was a new technique in China at the time. These were made with kilns, which were a new invention at the time. Materials were transported hundreds of miles either on the backs of workers, by hand carts or wheelbarrows, or on animal-driven carts.

There were two main techniques for building the wall. The first was the rammed earth method, which was used on level areas, and had been used by previous dynasties as well. Materials at the location were compressed together to build the wall. The Ming dynasty refined this technique by being able to do this on a larger scale than previous dynasties. The Ming builders also created a new technique, the two-layer method, which involved bricks and tiles. This was used on uneven terrain, like hills and mountains. Bricks were stacked diagonally if the incline or decline of the landscape was less than 45 degrees, and were shaped into stairs if the incline or decline was greater than 45 degrees.

== Siege techniques ==
The Mongol Northern Yuan dynasty used to send ahead a force of up to a thousand men that carried pickaxes to break down the wall whose core consisted mostly of rammed earth.

== Appraisal ==
In academia, opinions about the Wall's role in the Ming dynasty's downfall are mixed. Historians such as Arthur Waldron and Julia Lovell are critical of the whole wall-building exercise in light of its ultimate failure in protecting China; the former compared the Great Wall with the failed Maginot Line of the French in World War II. However, independent scholar David Spindler notes that the Wall, being only part of a complex foreign policy, received "disproportionate blame" because it was the most obvious relic of that policy.

== Bibliography ==
- Atwell, William (2008), "The T'ai-ch'ang, T'ien-ch'i, and Ch'ung-chen reigns, 1620–1644", in Frederick W. Mote and Denis Twitchett (ed.), The Cambridge History of China Volume 7: The Ming Dynasty, 1368–1644, Part 1, Cambridge: Cambridge University Press, pp. 585–640, ISBN 978-0-521-24332-2
- Edmonds, Richard Louis (1985). Northern Frontiers of Qing China and Tokugawa Japan: A Comparative Study of Frontier Policy. University of Chicago, Department of Geography; Research Paper No. 213. pp. 38–40. ISBN 978-0-89065-118-6.
- Elliott, Mark C. (2001). The Manchu Way: The Eight Banners and Ethnic Identity in Late Imperial China. Stanford University Press. ISBN 978-0-8047-4684-7.
- Hessler, Peter (2007). "Letter from China: Walking the Wall". The New Yorker. No. May 21, 2007. pp. 58–67.
- Mote, Frederick W. (1999), Imperial China: 900-1800, Cambridge, MA: Harvard University Press, ISBN 978-0-674-01212-7
- Owen, James (March 19, 2012). "'Lost' Great Wall of China Segment Found?". National Geographic News. Archived from the original on March 21, 2012.
- Spindler, David (2009). "A Twice-Scorned Mongol Woman, the Raid of 1576, and the Building of the Brick Great Wall". Ming Studies. 2009 (60). Maney Publishing: 66–94. doi:10.1179/175975909x12589849512419.
- Wakeman, Frederic (1985), The Great Enterprise: The Manchu Reconstruction of Imperial Order in Seventeenth-Century China, Berkeley, Los Angeles, and London: University of California Press, ISBN 978-0-520-04804-1. In two volumes.
- Waldron, Arthur (1983). "The Problem of The Great Wall of China". Harvard Journal of Asiatic Studies. 43 (2). Harvard-Yenching Institute: 643–663. doi:10.2307/2719110. JSTOR 2719110.
- Waldron, Arthur (1990). The Great Wall of China : from history to myth. Cambridge England New York: Cambridge University Press. ISBN 978-0-521-42707-4.
- 中国长城遗迹调查报告集 [Collected reports on surveys of the Great Wall of China] (in Chinese). Beijing: Cultural Relics Publishing House. 1981.
