= Donggang, Liaoning =

Donggang 东港市
- County-level city
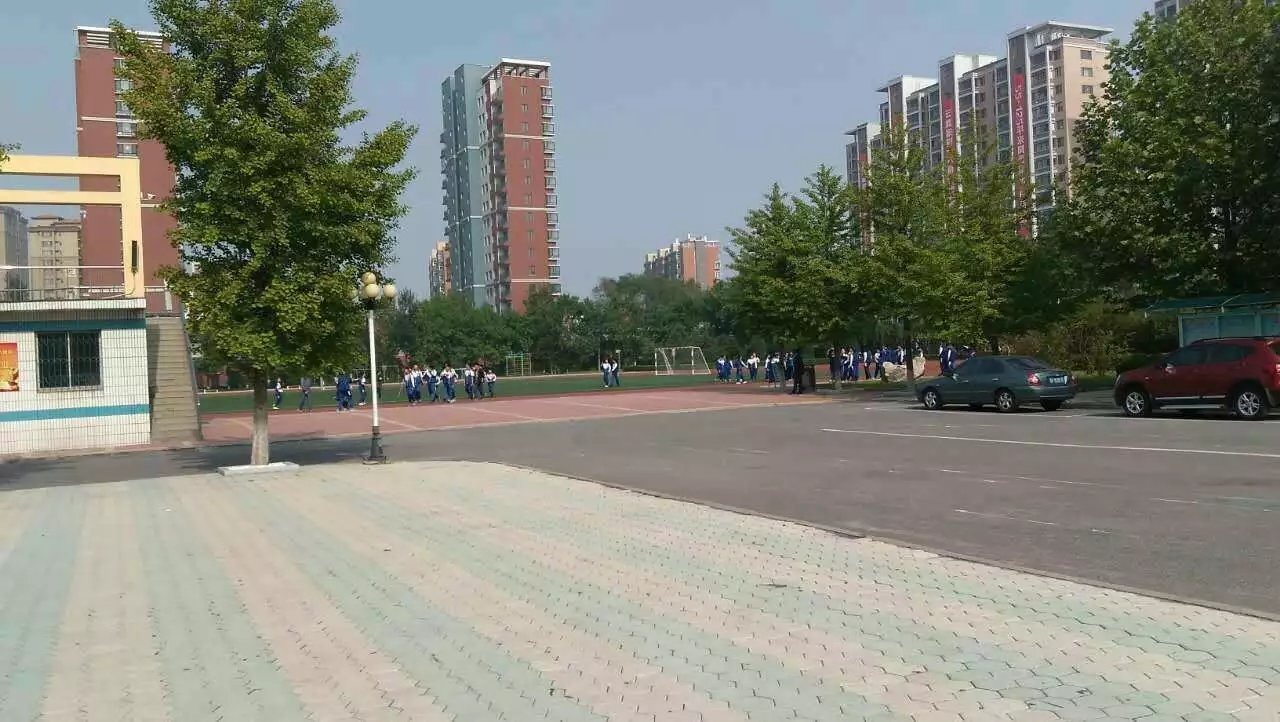

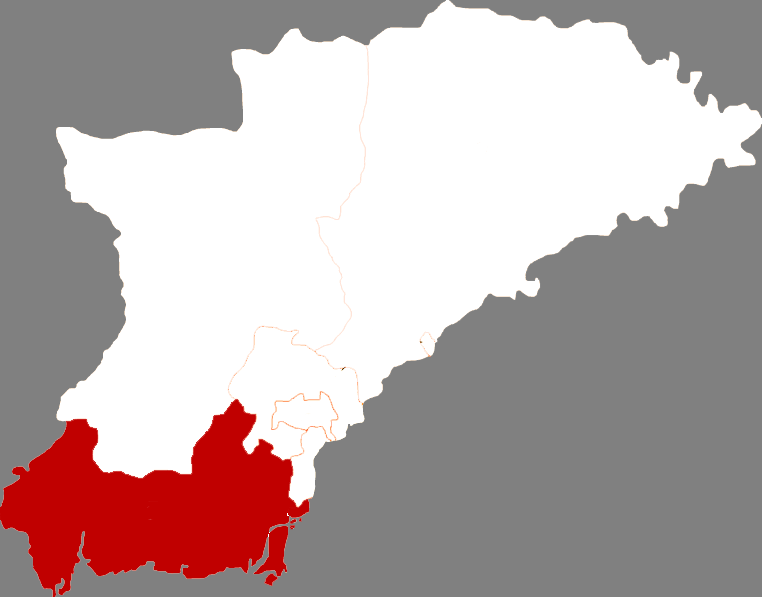
- Location in Dandong

- Location in Liaoning
- Coordinates: 39°52′N 124°09′E
- Country: People's Republic of China
- Province: Liaoning
- Prefecture-level city: Dandong

Area
  - County-level city: 2,398.0 km^{2} (925.9 sq mi)
  - Urban: 126.00 km^{2} (48.65 sq mi)

Population (2017)
  - County-level city: 609,000
  - Density: 254/km^{2} (658/sq mi)
  - Urban: 170,400
- Time zone: UTC+8 (China Standard)

Donggang (simplified Chinese: 东港; traditional Chinese: 東港; pinyin: Dōnggǎng; lit. 'Eastern Port') is a city in the southeast of Liaoning Province in Northeast China. Situated on the coast of the Yellow Sea at the mouth of the Yalu River, it is located near the maritime border with North Korea. Administratively, it is a county-level city of Dandong, the downtown of which lies 35 kilometres (22 mi) to the northeast.

== Administrative divisions ==
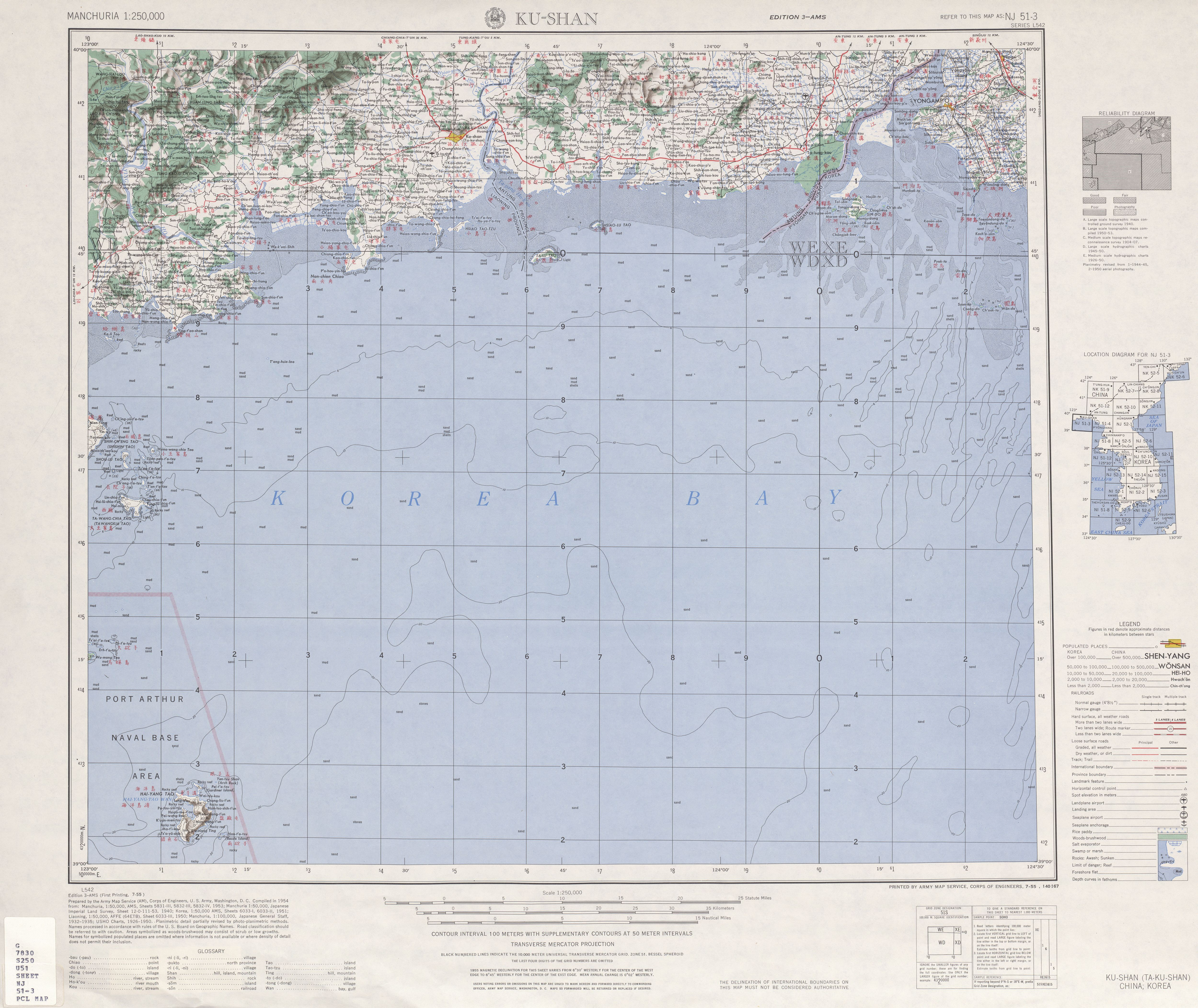
Gushan (labelled Ku-shan (Ta-ku-shan) 孤山 (大孤山)) (1954)

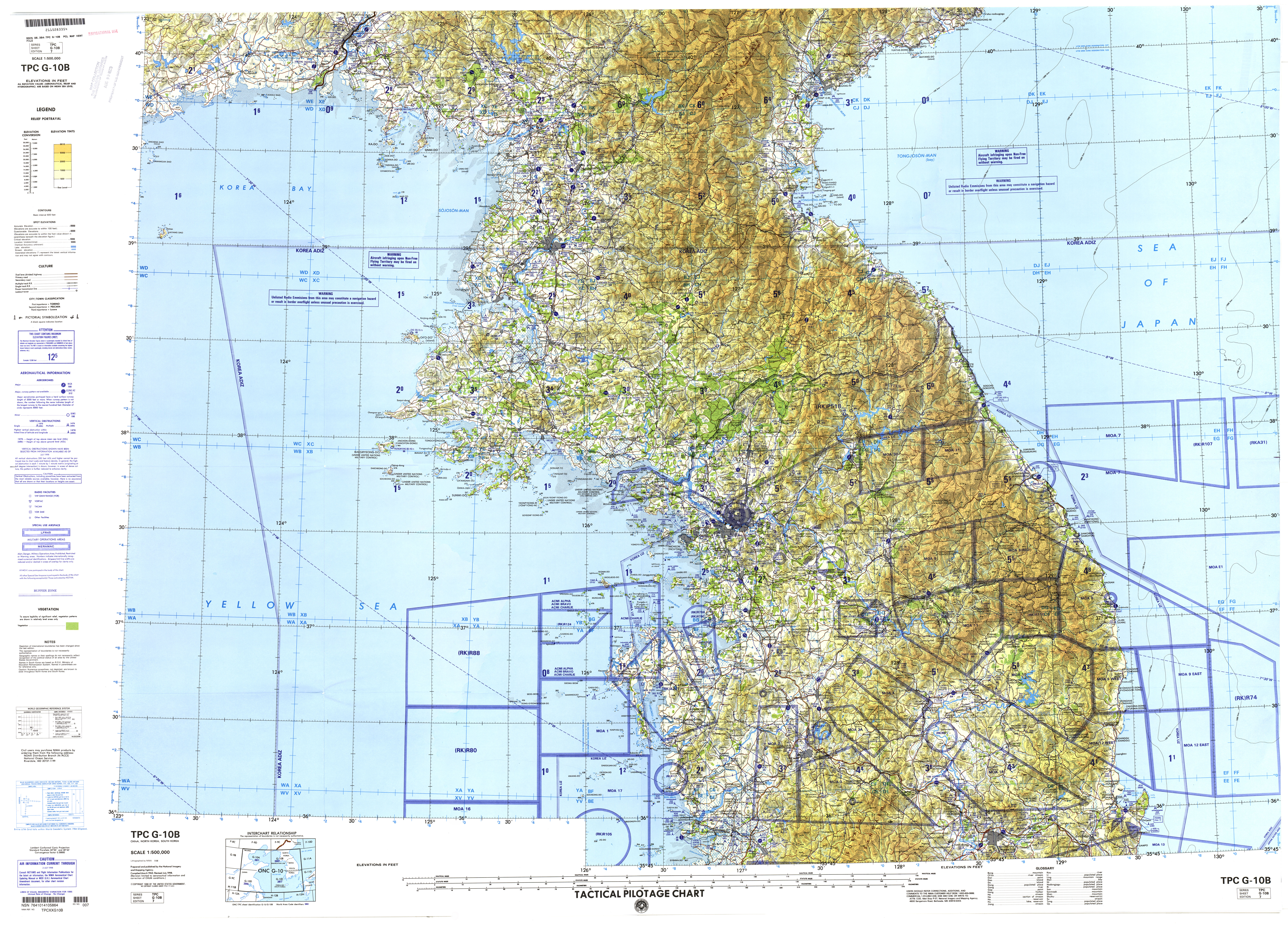
Map including Donggang area

There are three subdistricts, 14 towns, and one ethnic township under the city's administration.

Subdistricts

- Dadong Subdistrict (大东街道), Xincheng Subdistrict (新城街道), Xinxing Subdistrict (新兴街道)

Towns

- Gushan (Kushan) (孤山镇), Qianyang (前阳镇), Changshan (长山镇), Beijingzi (北井子镇), Yiquan (椅圈镇), Huangtukan (Hwangtukan) (黄土坎镇), Majiadian (马家店镇), Pusamiao (菩萨庙镇), Longwangmiao (龙王庙镇), Xiaodianzi (小甸子镇), Chang'an (长安镇), Xinnong (新农镇), Heigou (黑沟镇), Shizijie (十字街镇)

The only township is Helong Manchu Ethnic Township (合隆满族乡)

== Climate ==
Climate data for Donggang, elevation 4 m (13 ft), (1991–2020 normals, extremes 1981–present)
Month	Jan	Feb	Mar	Apr	May	Jun	Jul	Aug	Sep	Oct	Nov	Dec	Year
Record high °C (°F)	9.5 (49.1)	14.7 (58.5)	20.2 (68.4)	24.4 (75.9)	30.5 (86.9)	32.5 (90.5)	34.6 (94.3)	34.1 (93.4)	32.1 (89.8)	28.7 (83.7)	19.3 (66.7)	11.6 (52.9)	34.6 (94.3)
Mean daily maximum °C (°F)	−1.6 (29.1)	1.7 (35.1)	7.2 (45.0)	14.1 (57.4)	19.7 (67.5)	23.6 (74.5)	26.7 (80.1)	27.9 (82.2)	24.4 (75.9)	17.5 (63.5)	8.3 (46.9)	0.1 (32.2)	14.1 (57.5)
Daily mean °C (°F)	−6.7 (19.9)	−3.3 (26.1)	2.5 (36.5)	9.4 (48.9)	15.3 (59.5)	20.0 (68.0)	23.4 (74.1)	24.1 (75.4)	19.3 (66.7)	11.8 (53.2)	3.4 (38.1)	−4.5 (23.9)	9.6 (49.2)
Mean daily minimum °C (°F)	−10.9 (12.4)	−7.7 (18.1)	−1.7 (28.9)	4.9 (40.8)	11.3 (52.3)	16.8 (62.2)	20.9 (69.6)	20.9 (69.6)	14.7 (58.5)	6.8 (44.2)	−0.8 (30.6)	−8.4 (16.9)	5.6 (42.0)
Record low °C (°F)	−25.5 (−13.9)	−23.9 (−11.0)	−11.7 (10.9)	−4.6 (23.7)	2.8 (37.0)	9.4 (48.9)	15.4 (59.7)	11.8 (53.2)	3.4 (38.1)	−5.2 (22.6)	−13.6 (7.5)	−23.5 (−10.3)	−25.5 (−13.9)
Average precipitation mm (inches)	5.2 (0.20)	14.0 (0.55)	18.9 (0.74)	48.0 (1.89)	83.9 (3.30)	106.6 (4.20)	211.3 (8.32)	218.0 (8.58)	81.6 (3.21)	51.2 (2.02)	36.8 (1.45)	15.5 (0.61)	891 (35.07)
Average precipitation days (≥ 0.1 mm)	2.9	3.6	4.2	6.9	9.6	10.7	13.7	11.6	6.6	6.3	5.9	4.0	86
Average snowy days	4.4	3.8	2.0	0.4	0	0	0	0	0	0	2.1	4.9	17.6
Average relative humidity (%)	59	61	65	68	75	84	88	85	78	71	66	62	72
Mean monthly sunshine hours	186.7	183.3	217.5	217.0	230.2	185.9	146.1	186.5	216.5	203.2	159.9	167.9	2,300.7
Percentage possible sunshine	62	60	58	54	52	42	32	44	59	59	54	58	53
Source: China Meteorological Administration All-time October Lowall-time May high
