= Hushan Great Wall =

Section of the Ming Great Wall in Liaoning, China

Coordinates: 40°13′18″N 124°30′55″E

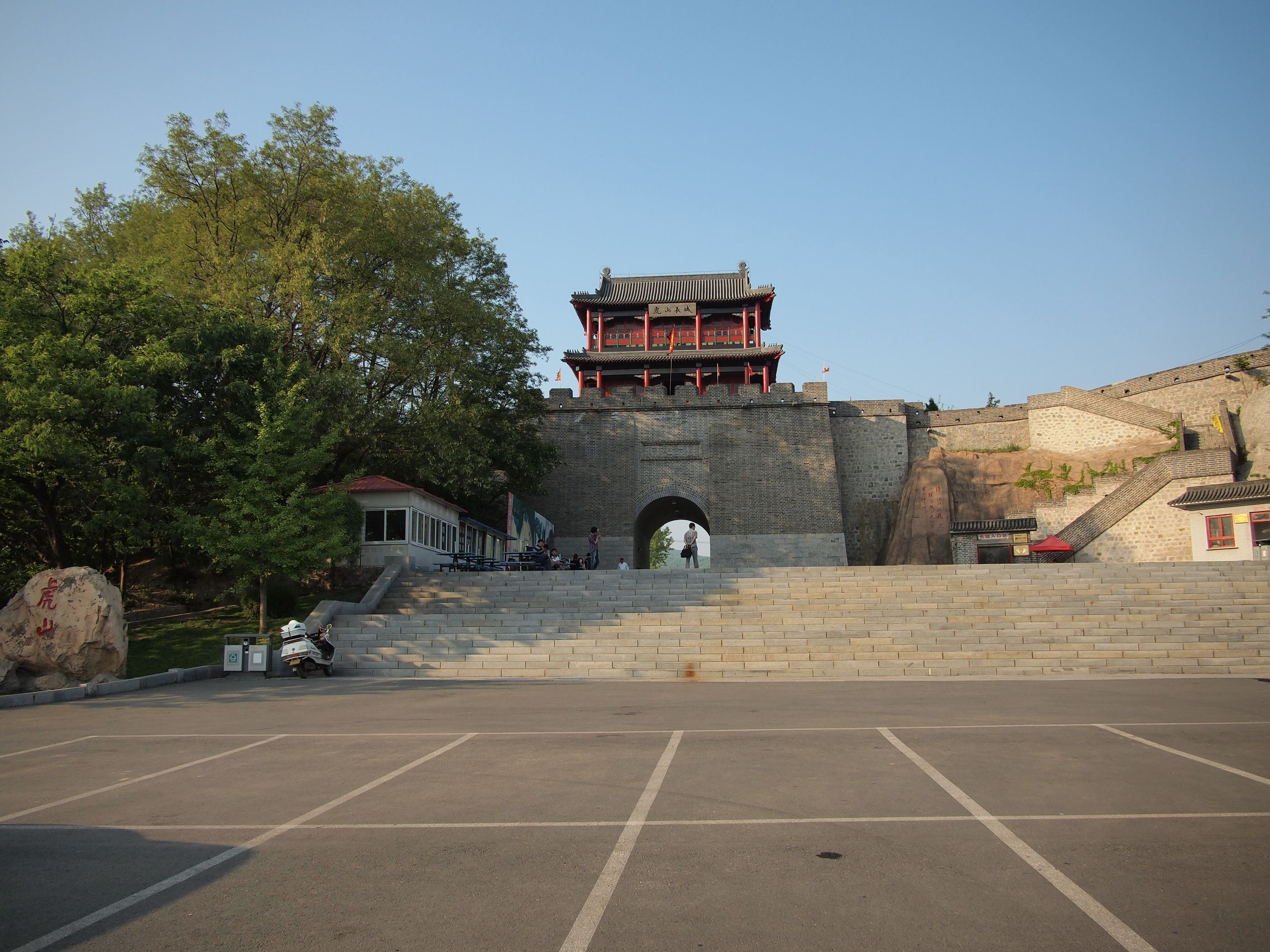
Gate of the Hushan Great Wall, reconstructed in the 1990s

The Hushan or Tiger Mountain Great Wall (Chinese: 虎山长城; pinyin: Hǔshān Chángchéng), is a section of the Ming Great Wall in Kuandian Manchu Autonomous County, Liaoning, China. The wall runs for about 1,200 metres over Hushan ("Tiger Mountain").

The wall starts 15 km northeast of Dandong city, directly beside the China–North Korea border. It then climbs steeply up to a height of 146.3 metres before descending on the other side of Hushan and finishing at a car park.

Numerous Ming dynasty records and poems mentioned a "border wall" (边墙) that reached the banks of Yalu River, forming a part of Ming's defense system on the northern frontier. This wall was meant to defend against Jurchen bandits who frequently raided Ming and Joseon villages from the Northeast. The date of its construction was documented by the Ming Shilu as the 15th year of Chenghua era (AD 1479). Archives of Andong (Dandong) county put the wall's location to the north of the Ai River (叆河), in the Hushan area. A series of surveys in late 1980s and early 1990s led by architectural historian Luo Zhewen identified the ruins at Hushan as the site of the eastern terminus of this Great Wall section. An 1,250 metres (4,100 ft) long section was restored in 1992.

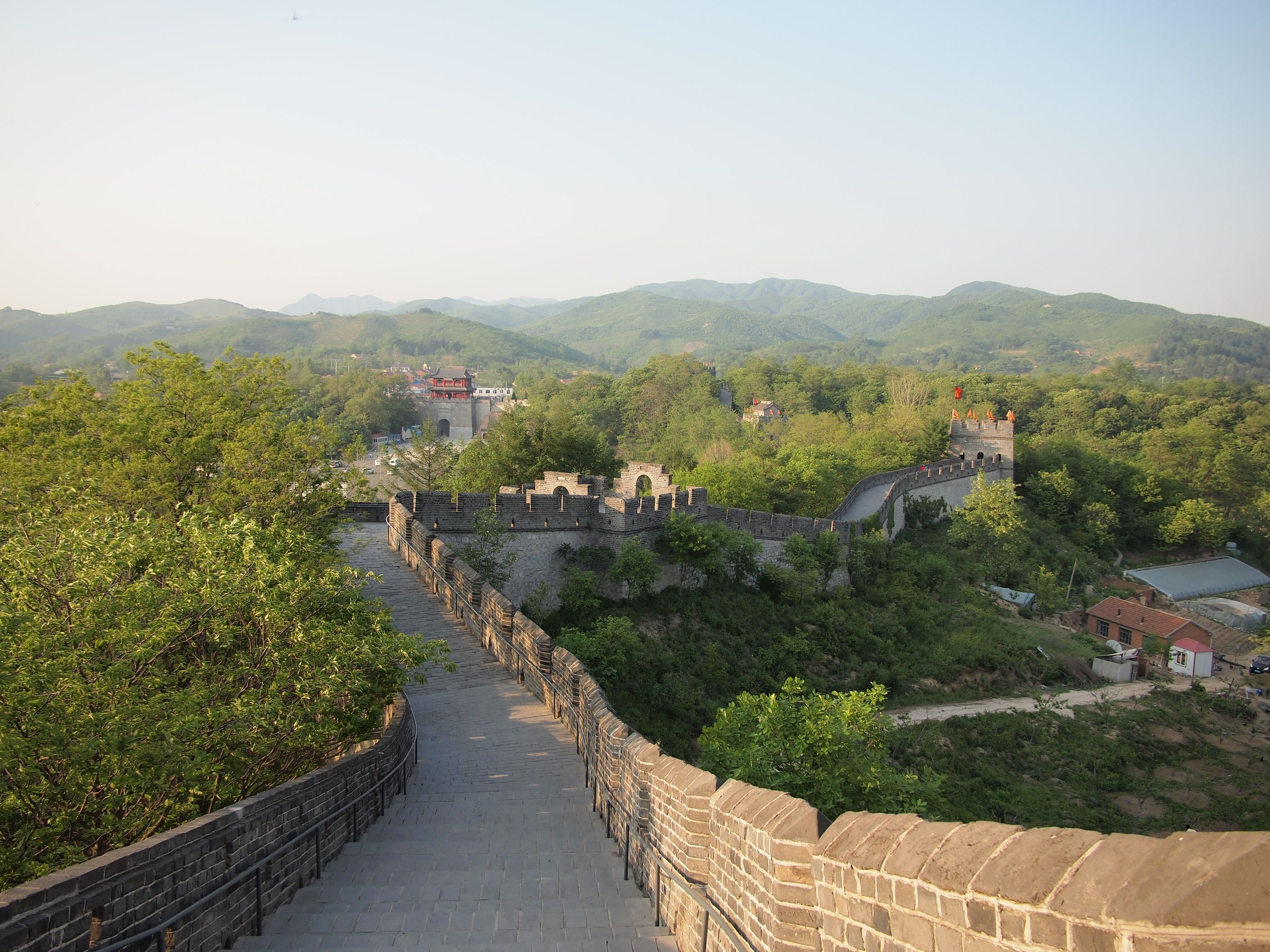
View of the Hushan Great Wall

Ruins of older fortresses have been identified at Hushan, dating back to the Four Commanderies of Han and Goguryeo eras. In order to defend against nomadic tribes to the north, many of these fortresses and walls were built during those times. Similar sites have also been discovered elsewhere in Liaoning, as well as in North Pyongan and Chagang provinces, North Korea. The site of a historical city known as Posuo (婆娑) or Bakjak (泊汋, 박작) lies in proximity at present-day Jiuliancheng, to the south of Hushan.

On the other hand, North and South Korea academics show skepticisms on the historical existence of the Hushan great wall due to lack of evidence. Some South Korean archeologists and experts argue that the walls and fortifications were likely originally built by the allied Ming and Joseon to defend against Jurchen marauders to the north. China, by claiming them as part of the Ming dynasty great wall, was committing "history distortion with political intentions."

== See also ==
- Cheolli Jangseong
