= Dandong =

Dandong 丹东市 Andong
- Prefecture-level city
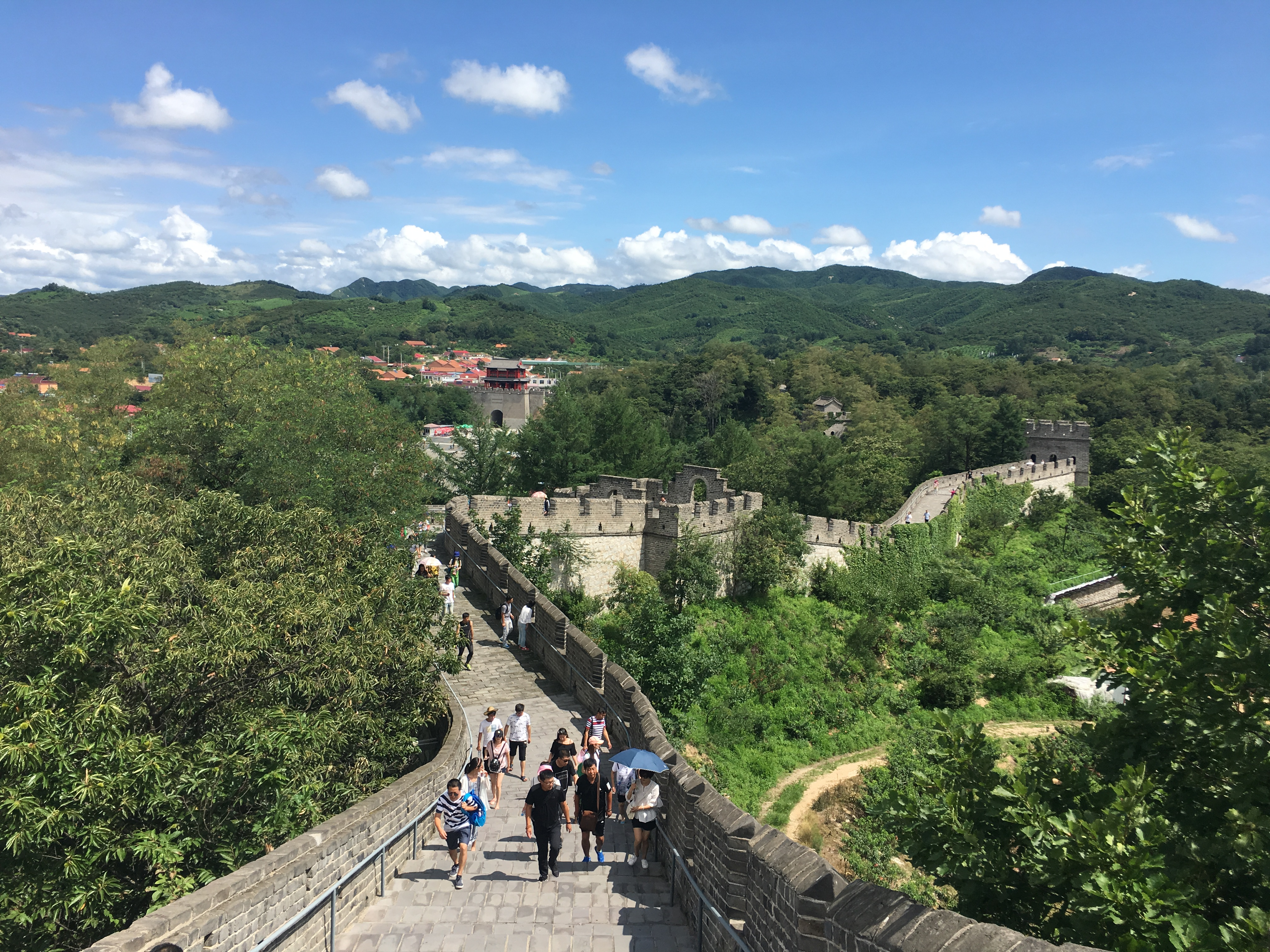
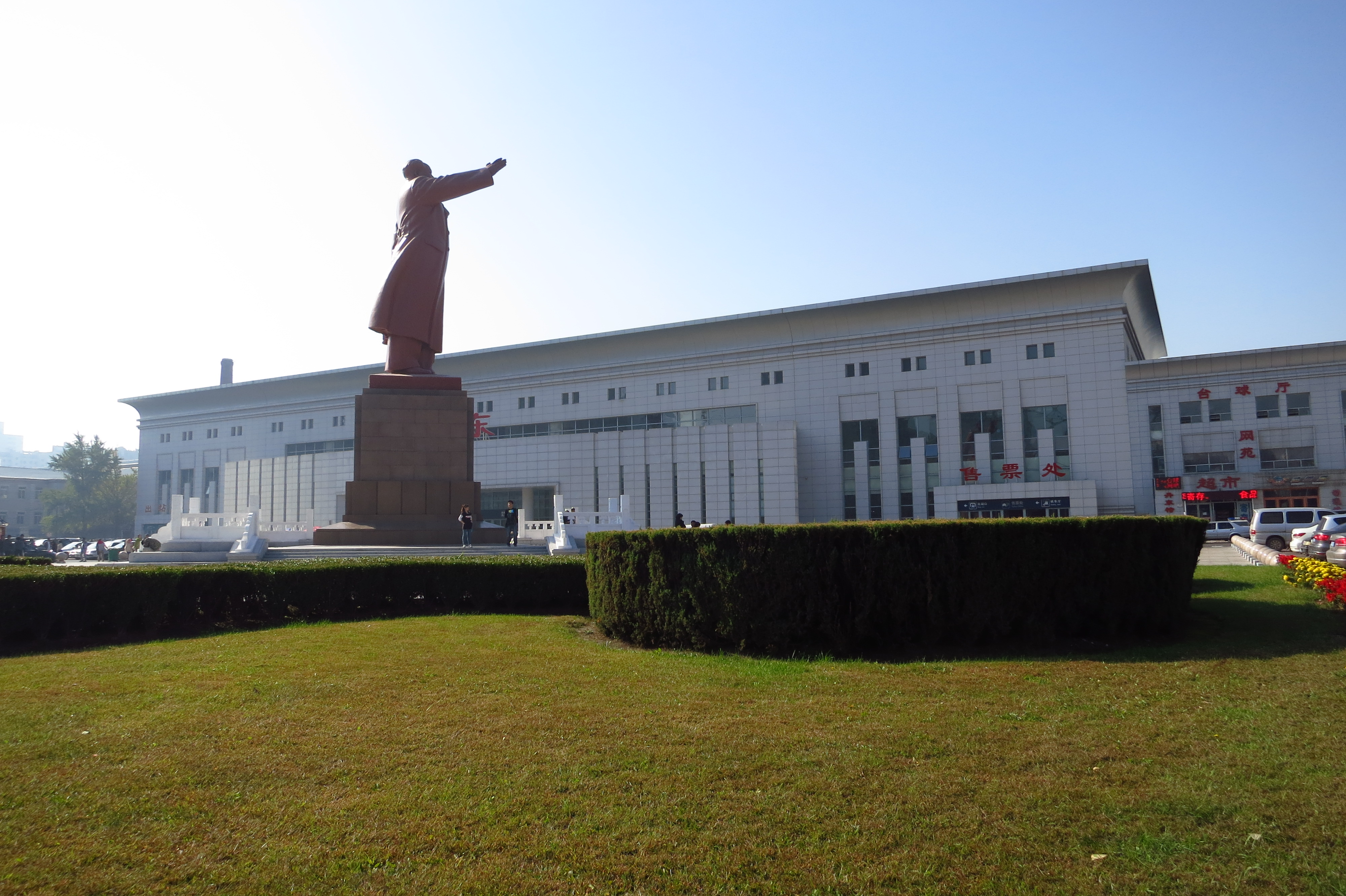
- View of Dandong's skyline on the Yalu River Sino-Korean Friendship Bridge Hushan Great Wall Jinjiangshan Park Dandong railway station

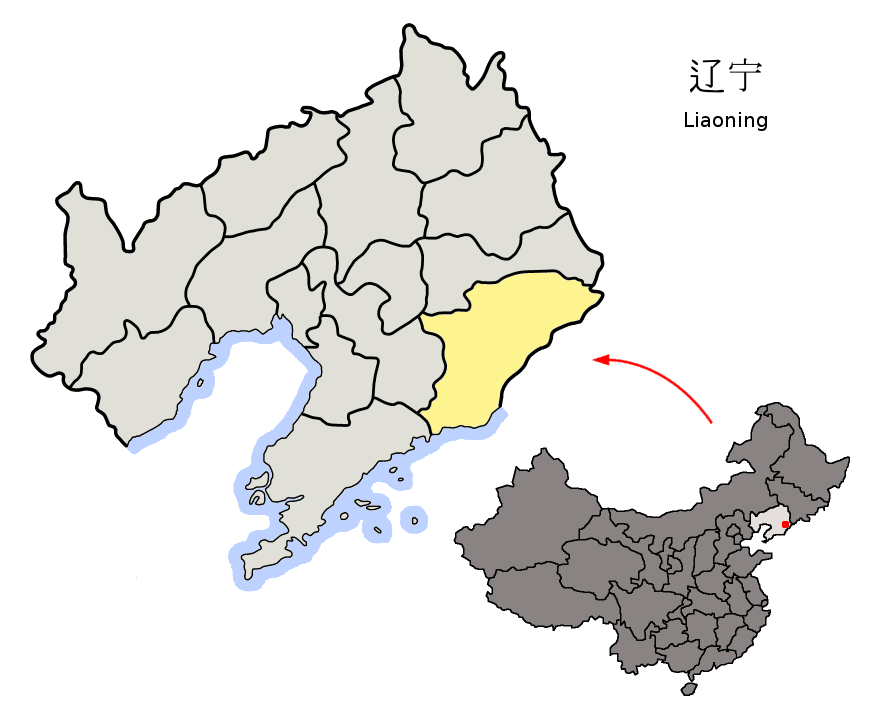
- Location of Dandong City jurisdiction in Liaoning

- Location of the city center in Liaoning
- Coordinates (Dandong Customs): 40°07′16″N 124°23′39″E
- Country: China
- Province: Liaoning
- Municipal seat: Zhenxing District
- Districts and counties: List: Zhenxing District; Yuanbao District; Zhen'an District; Fengcheng City; Donggang City; Kuandian Manchu Autonomous County

Government
  - CCP Secretary: Pei Weidong
  - Congress Chairperson: Yu Bing
  - Mayor: Hao Jianjun
  - Prefectural CPPCC Chairperson: Song Liyue

Area
  - Prefecture-level city: 14,782 km^{2} (5,707 sq mi)
  - Urban: 995.2 km^{2} (384.2 sq mi)
  - Metro: 1,184.2 km^{2} (457.2 sq mi)
- Elevation: 8 m (26 ft)

Population (2020 census)
  - Prefecture-level city: 2,188,436
  - Density: 148.05/km^{2} (383.44/sq mi)
  - Urban: 815,858
  - Urban density: 819.8/km^{2} (2,123/sq mi)
  - Metro: 1,175,199
  - Metro density: 992.40/km^{2} (2,570.3/sq mi)

GDP
  - Prefecture-level city: RMB 89 billion USD 15.8 billion
  - Per capita: RMB 40,791; USD 6,549
- Time zone: UTC+8 (CST)
- Postal code: 118000
- Area code: 415
- ISO 3166 code: CN-LN-06
- Licence plates: 辽F
- Administrative division code: 210600
- Website: dandong.gov.cn

Dandong
- "Dandong", as written in Chinese

Chinese name
- Simplified Chinese: 丹东
- Traditional Chinese: 丹東
- Postal: Tantung; Antung (until 1965)
Transcriptions
Standard Mandarin
- Hanyu Pinyin: Dāndōng
- Wade–Giles: Tan^{1}-tung^{1}

Andong
- Simplified Chinese: 安东
- Traditional Chinese: 安東
- Postal: Antung
Transcriptions
Standard Mandarin
- Hanyu Pinyin: Āndōng
- Wade–Giles: An^{1}-tung^{1}

Manchu name
- Manchu script: ᡩᠠᠨ ᡩᠣᠩ
- Möllendorff: Dan dong

Dandong (Note: Chinese: 丹东; pinyin: Dāndōng; formerly known as Andong) is a coastal prefecture-level city in southeastern Liaoning, in the northeastern region of China.

It is the largest Chinese border city, facing Sinuiju, North Korea, across the Yalu River, which demarcates the Sino-Korean border. To the southwest of the city, the river flows into Korea Bay. Dandong has had a dynamic history due to its strategic location for the northeast's rich natural resources and because of its convenient access to the ocean. It is designated as a major export production centre for the province, and it is a port city connected by rail with Shenyang and Sinuiju. A significant amount of trade with North Korea flows through the city.

The size of the administrative city (prefecture) is 14,981.4 square kilometres (5,784.4 sq mi). As of the 2020 census, its population was 2,188,436 inhabitants, and the built-up area, consisting of three urban districts, was 830 square kilometres (320 sq mi), with 815,576 inhabitants.

== Geography ==
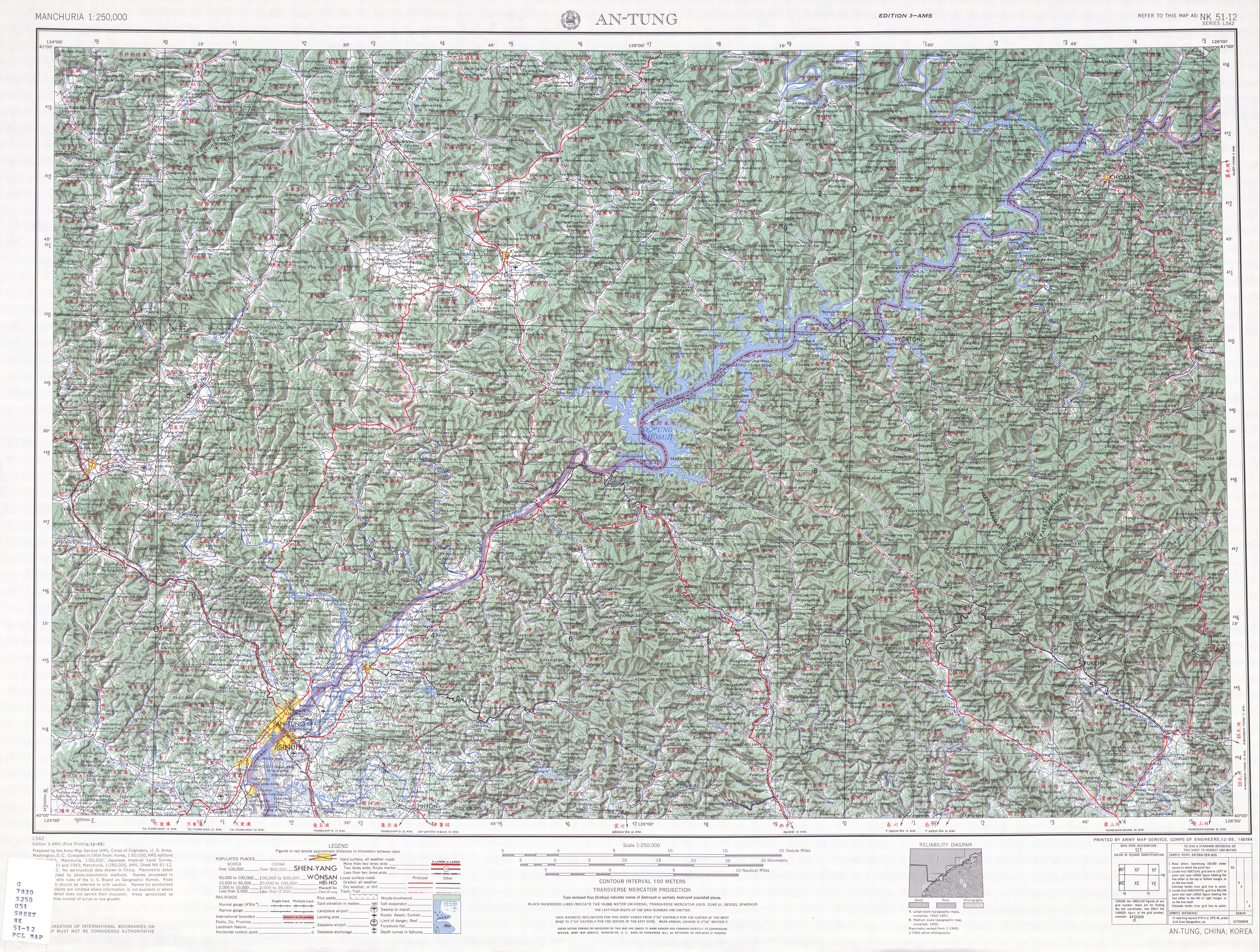
Dandong (labelled as AN-TUNG 安東) (1954)

Dandong is located on the western border of North Korea and the northwest (right) shore of the Yalu River, facing Sinuiju to the southeast. It is situated on the southeast corner of the Liaodong Peninsula, near the mouth of the Yalu River, which empties into Korea Bay, which is part of the Yellow Sea. There are 120 kilometres (75 mi) of coastline and islands, including Dalu Island (大鹿岛; lit. "great deer island") and Xiaomai Island (小麦岛; lit. "wheat island").

Dandong ranges in latitude from 39° 43' to 41° 09' N and in longitude from 123° 22' to 125° 41' E, and at its greatest spans 196 kilometres (122 mi) from east to west and 160 kilometres (99 mi) from south to north. Bordering prefectures are Dalian (SW), Anshan (W), Liaoyang (NW), and Benxi (N).

=== Climate ===
The area has long winters, and humid, somewhat hot summers belonging to the humid continental climate regime (Köppen Dwa). Winter usually begins in late November and continues until the end of March, with the most severe cold only lasting for around three weeks in December, January, or February. The coldest month, January, averages −7.3 °C (18.9 °F). Spring, though a period of quick warming, is delayed by one month compared to more inland parts of the province and is somewhat dry until May. Summer heat is moderated by proximity to the coast. The city's warmest month, August, averages 23.6 °C (74.5 °F). With monthly sunshine ranging from 35% in July to 67% in February, the city receives 2,459 hours of sunshine annually and is, outside of the summer months, generally sunny.

For the city proper, the annual mean temperature is 9.20 °C (48.6 °F), and the total precipitation is 926 millimetres (36 in), but within the prefecture, annual means can be as low as 6.8 °C (44.2 °F), while precipitation ranges from 881.3 to 1,087.5 millimetres (34.70 to 42.81 in).

Climate data for Dandong, elevation 14 m (46 ft), (1991–2020 normals, extremes 1951–present)
Month	Jan	Feb	Mar	Apr	May	Jun	Jul	Aug	Sep	Oct	Nov	Dec	Year
Record high °C (°F)	9.5 (49.1)	15.2 (59.4)	21.9 (71.4)	27.3 (81.1)	30.3 (86.5)	34.5 (94.1)	36.5 (97.7)	38.3 (100.9)	32.2 (90.0)	30.4 (86.7)	22.4 (72.3)	13.0 (55.4)	38.3 (100.9)
Mean daily maximum °C (°F)	−1.8 (28.8)	1.9 (35.4)	7.7 (45.9)	15.0 (59.0)	20.8 (69.4)	24.7 (76.5)	27.1 (80.8)	28.2 (82.8)	24.6 (76.3)	17.5 (63.5)	8.0 (46.4)	−0.3 (31.5)	14.5 (58.0)
Daily mean °C (°F)	−6.8 (19.8)	−3.4 (25.9)	2.4 (36.3)	9.4 (48.9)	15.5 (59.9)	20.2 (68.4)	23.4 (74.1)	23.8 (74.8)	18.9 (66.0)	11.5 (52.7)	3.1 (37.6)	−4.8 (23.4)	9.4 (49.0)
Mean daily minimum °C (°F)	−10.8 (12.6)	−7.7 (18.1)	−1.9 (28.6)	4.7 (40.5)	10.9 (51.6)	16.5 (61.7)	20.7 (69.3)	20.5 (68.9)	14.6 (58.3)	6.7 (44.1)	−0.9 (30.4)	−8.6 (16.5)	5.4 (41.7)
Record low °C (°F)	−27.8 (−18.0)	−28.0 (−18.4)	−25.2 (−13.4)	−7 (19)	1.5 (34.7)	5.3 (41.5)	12.1 (53.8)	9.5 (49.1)	2.6 (36.7)	−5.8 (21.6)	−14.9 (5.2)	−23.8 (−10.8)	−28.0 (−18.4)
Average precipitation mm (inches)	6.3 (0.25)	16.0 (0.63)	20.5 (0.81)	52.9 (2.08)	89.6 (3.53)	107.1 (4.22)	259.2 (10.20)	234.7 (9.24)	92.4 (3.64)	55.8 (2.20)	38.9 (1.53)	15.2 (0.60)	988.6 (38.93)
Average precipitation days (≥ 0.1 mm)	3.2	3.9	4.5	7.1	9.2	10.8	13.8	11.8	6.9	6.4	6.3	4.4	88.3
Average snowy days	4.3	3.9	2.3	0.4	0	0	0	0	0	0.1	2.1	5.1	18.2
Average relative humidity (%)	55	56	60	64	72	81	87	85	77	69	63	59	69
Mean monthly sunshine hours	195.9	193.6	226.0	226.1	246.1	203.1	152.9	195.6	222.9	209.8	166.7	173.2	2,411.9
Percentage possible sunshine	65	64	61	57	55	45	34	46	60	61	56	60	55
Source: China Meteorological Administrationextremes

== Administrative divisions ==
Dandong is divided into three districts, two towns, and one autonomous county:

Map
#	Name	Chinese	Hanyu Pinyin	Population (2003 est.)	Area (km^{2})	Density (/km^{2})
1	Zhenxing District	振兴区	Zhènxīng Qū	380,000	80	4,750
2	Yuanbao District	元宝区	Yuánbǎo Qū	180,000	81	2,222
3	Zhen'an District	振安区	Zhèn'ān Qū	190,000	669	284
4	Fengcheng City	凤城市	Fèngchéng Shì	580,000	5,518	105
5	Donggang City	东港市	Dōnggǎng Shì	640,000	2,496	256
6	Kuandian Manchu; Autonomous County	宽甸满族自治县	Kuāndiàn Mǎnzú; Zìzhìxiàn	440,000	6,186	71

== History ==
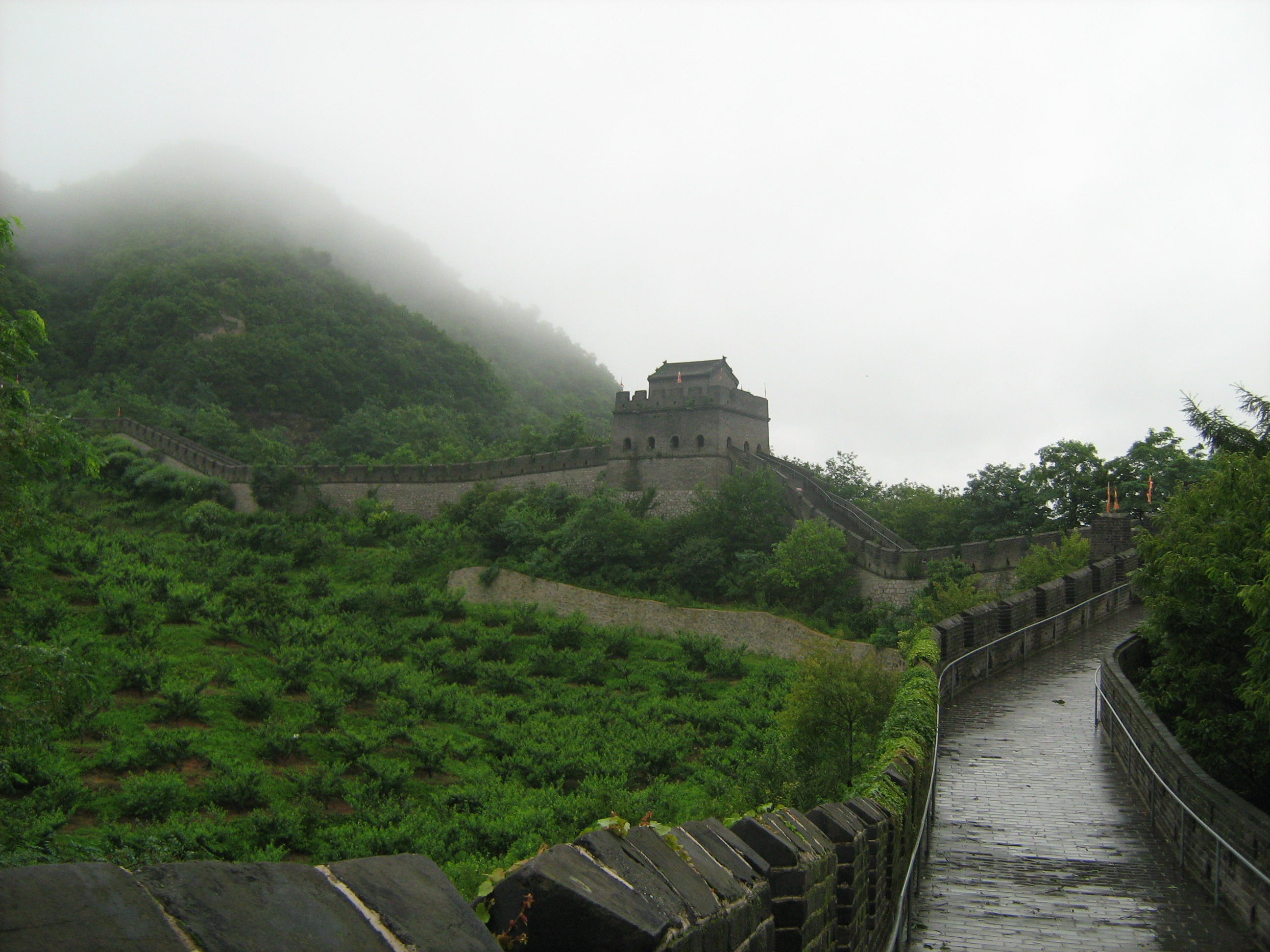
The Great Wall at Dandong

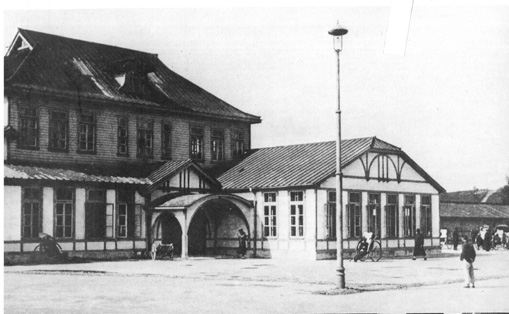
Andong railway station during the Manchukuo period

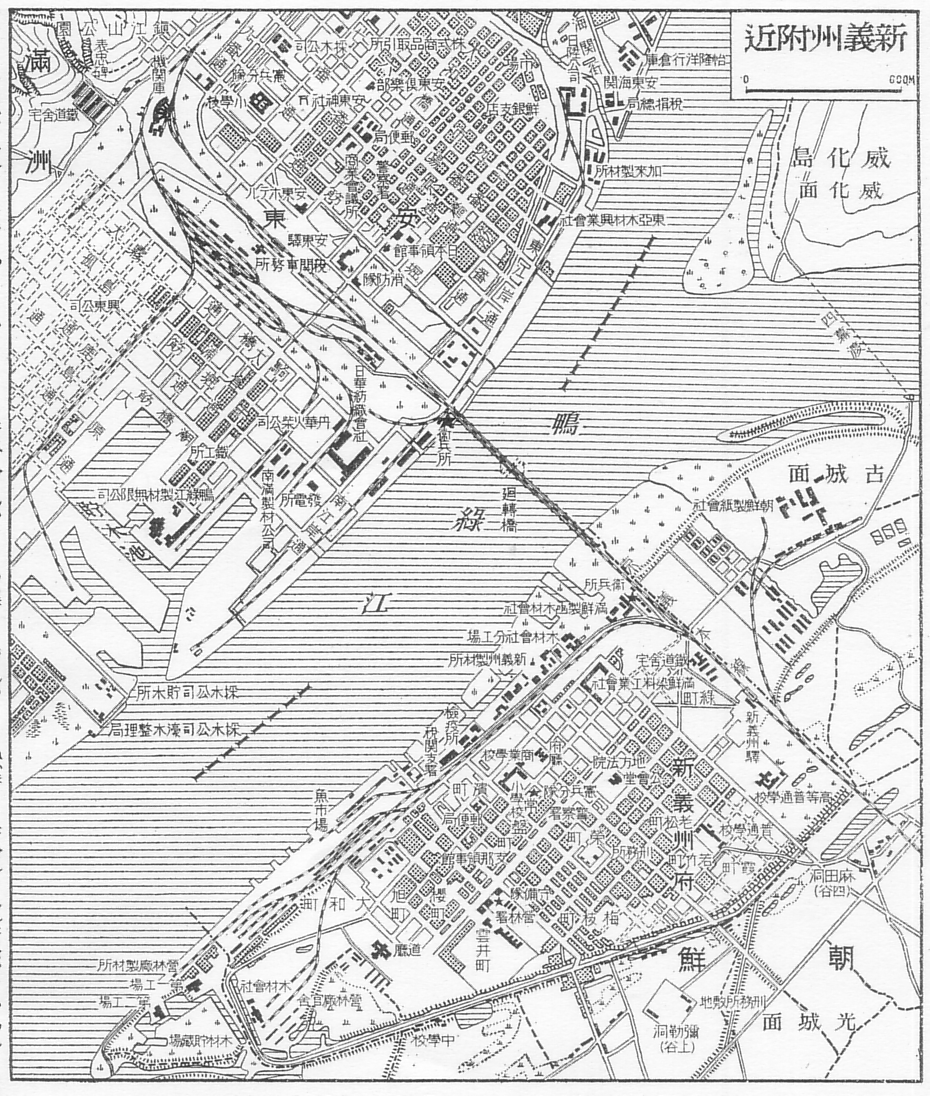
Map of Dandong and Sinuiju in the 1930s

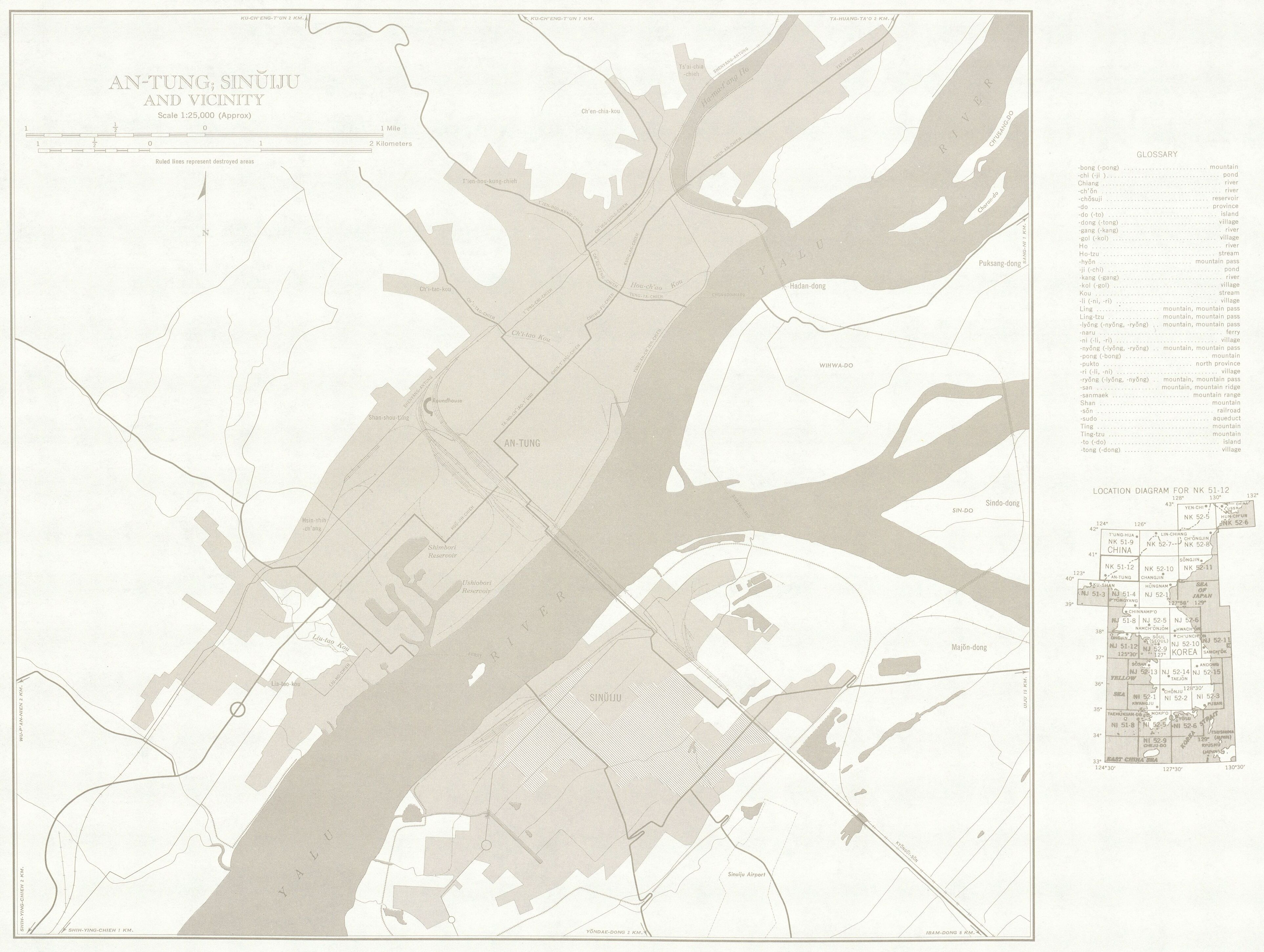
Map of Dandong (An-tung) and Sinuiju

Maps and artifacts suggest that the area has been settled since the Gojoseon kingdom period.

During the Han dynasty (221 BC–220 AD), the Dandong region was under the jurisdiction of west Anping county. During the Goguryeo kingdom period, the region was the site of the Bakjak fortress. After the fall of the Goguryeo, in the early Tang dynasty (618–907), the Dandong region was under the jurisdiction of Andong Prefecture. In the 8th century, the area was conquered by King Mun of Balhae (r. 737–793). During the Liao dynasty (916–1125), it was under the jurisdictions of the states of Xuan, Kai, and Mu.

It fell under the jurisdiction of the state of Po-Su in the Jin dynasty, the state of Po-Sha in the Yuan dynasty, and the state of Liaodong in the Ming dynasty.

The area became known as Andong County (安東縣) in 1876. "安東" means "pacifying the east", reflecting the power that China had over Korea at the time. After the start of the first Sino-Japanese War in 1894, Andong County was occupied by Japan. During the Manchukuo era, it was the capital of Andong Province, one of fourteen established by Manchukuo. It was opened as an American treaty port in 1903.

From November 1950 to February 1951, Dandong's Sino–Korean Friendship Bridge was bombed by the United States during the Korean War, as was an older iron bridge leading to North Korea. Even though the Sino–Korean Friendship Bridge was rebuilt, the remains of the Japanese-built iron bridge were left and now serve as a war monument.

On 20 January 1965, the city adopted its present name of Dandong, which means "red east", to avoid the connotations of its previous name, which was considered imperialistic by some.

In 2001, Dandong was granted the "Best Tourist Destination City" award by the National Tourism Administration. Four years later, the same administration granted it the award of "National Clean City".

== Demographics ==
Per the 2020 Chinese census, Dandong had a total population of 2,188,436. Its urban core totaled 1,090,680 (49.84%), while another 416,791 people (19.05%) lived in other urban areas in Dandong. 680,965 people (31.12%) lived in rural areas.

Population pyramid 2020
%	Males	Age	Females	%
0.65		85+		0.84
0.88		80–84		1.02
1.47		75–79		1.64
2.48		70–74		2.67
4.07		65–69		4.30
4.44		60–64		4.61
5.13		55–59		5.21
5.06		50–54		5.11
4.49		45–49		4.45
3.67		40–44		3.61
3.08		35–39		3.07
3.47		30–34		3.45
2.25		25–29		2.22
1.60		20–24		1.58
1.94		15–19		1.76
1.71		10–14		1.62
1.76		5–9		1.66
1.57		0–4		1.48

Per 2020 census data, there were 928,784 households in Dandong, with an average size of 2.36 people. The sex ratio was 98.88 males per 100 females. 9.80% of the population were 0–14 years old, 70.20% 15–64 years old, and 20.02% were 65 and older.

=== Ethnic composition ===
Dandong is a multiethnic area, with at least 48 ethnic groups, including the Han, Manchus, Mongols, Koreans, the Hui, and the Sibe. As of 2020, Han Chinese people comprised 64.59% of Dandong's population (1,413,438 people). The city's second largest ethnic group is the Manchu, who made up 32.43% of its population (709,719 people). Ethnic Mongols comprise the city's third largest ethnic group, accounting for 1.14% of its population (24,873 people) in 2020. The city's fourth largest ethnic group is Koreans, who made up 0.77% of its total population (16,859 people). In Dandong, the Korean language is used in a number of signs and advertisements as well as in public services. The city is home to many Korean restaurants, shops, churches, schools, and other cultural institutions. The Hui make up the city's fifth largest community, at 0.59% of its population (12,983 people) in 2020. The Sibe people comprise Dandong's sixth largest ethnic group, at 0.33% of its population (7,259 people).

== Economy ==
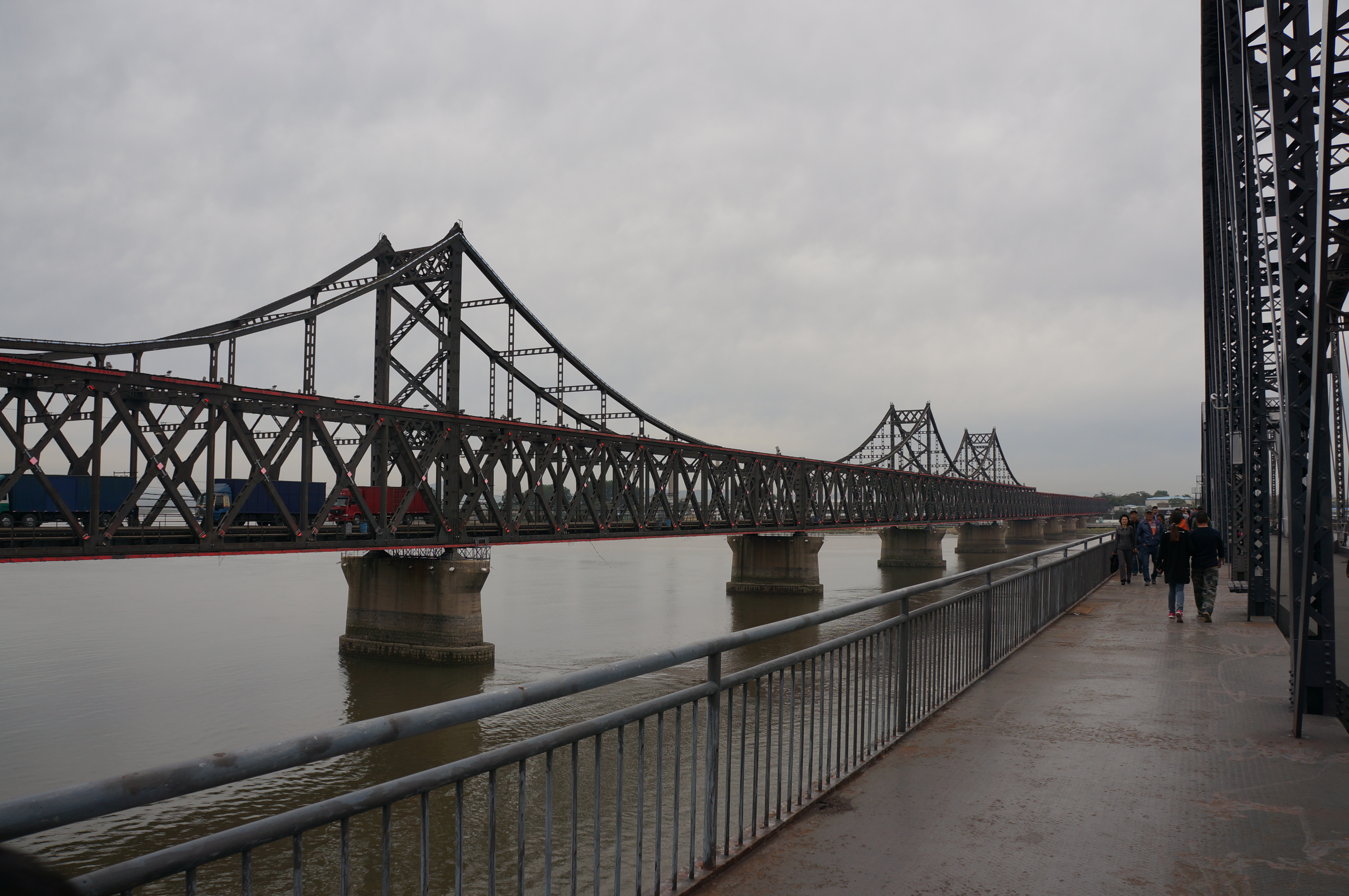
Bridge from Sinuiju, North Korea, across the Yalu River to Dandong, with North Korean trucks entering China.

The total GDP of the city of Dandong was CN¥89.07 billion ($15.81 billion) in the year 2022. The GDP per capita was CN¥41,730 ($6,549).

A substantial portion of North Korea's international trade, both legal and illegal, passes through Dandong and Sinuiju, across the Yalu River in North Korea. China handles roughly 40% of North Korea's worldwide export trade ($1.58 of US$4 billion) and roughly half of the bilateral commerce with China goes through Dandong, which imports $468 million [USD worth of product], according to its Ministry of Commerce.

The city had 5.86 million tourists in 2004, of which 16,000 travelled into North Korea; another 81,000 were from overseas and contributed US$27.54 million to the economy. In 2004, the total tourism income was 4.02 billion yuan [RMB], an increase of almost 33% from the previous year.

Memory cards and teddy bears are among the most popular items for North Koreans shopping in Dandong.

=== Development zones ===
The Dandong Border Economic Corporation Zone was approved as a national-level development zone in 1992. It is located on the bank of Yalu River, opposite the North Korean city of Sinuiju. It includes the following industries: electronic information, machine manufacturing, and biopharmaceuticals, among others.

The Dandong Qianyang Economic Development Zone was first approved as a special economic zone in 1994 by the government of Liaoning Province as the Liaoning Dandong Qianyang Economic Development Zone. In 2009, the development of the Liaoning Coastal Economic Belt was listed as a national strategy. Qianyang Town, situated at the eastern tip of the belt, is an important component of Dandong's coastal development.

== Infrastructure ==
=== Railways ===
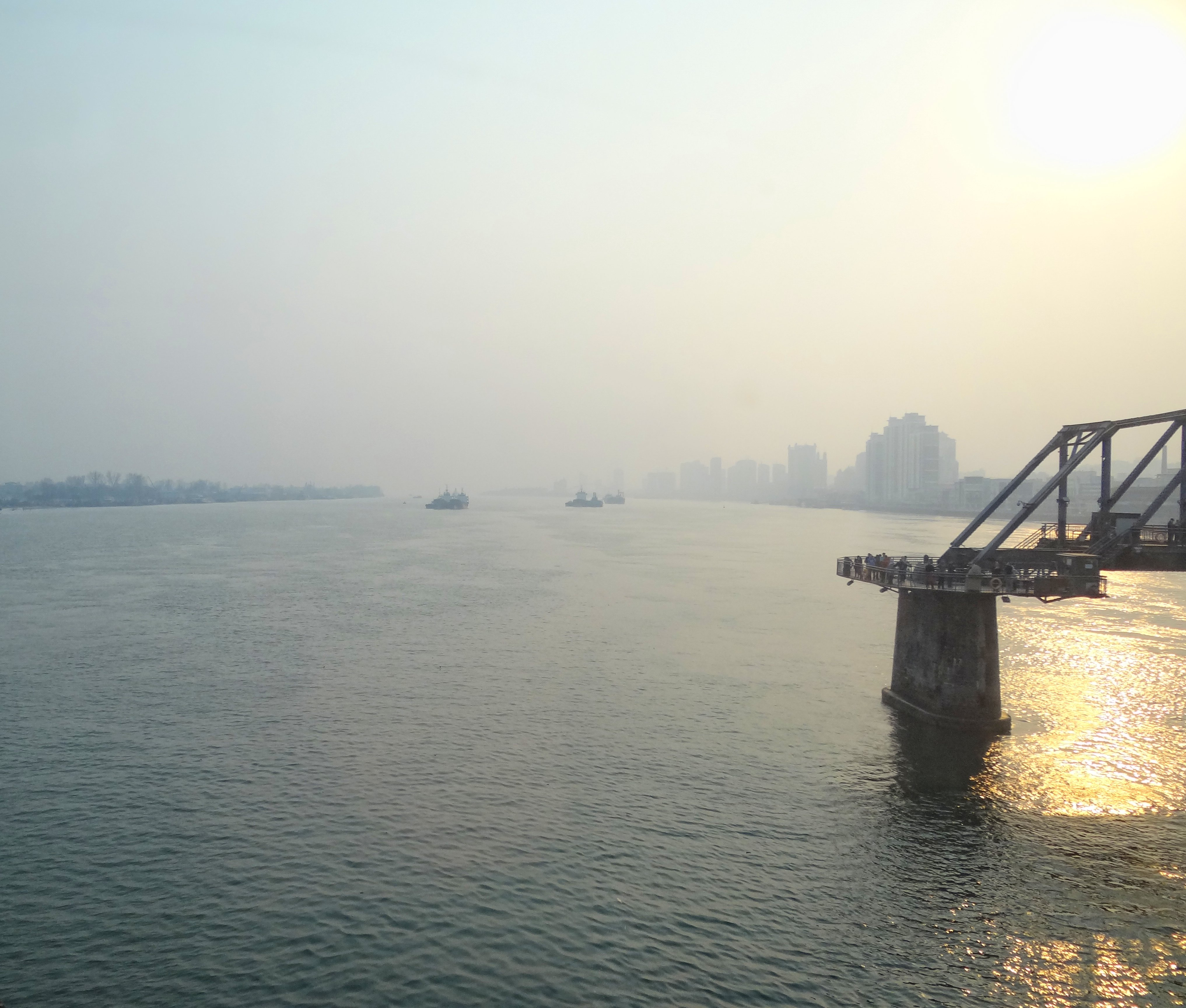
Crossing into North Korea over the Yalu River

- Shenyang–Dandong intercity railway

Trains from Dandong to Shenyang run several times a day, and night trains operate to Beijing, Dalian, Changchun, Qingdao, and Shanghai. From Dalian, the high-speed train takes less than three hours, or from Beijing, less than seven.

International trains link Dandong with Pyongyang daily. Both Chinese and North Korean carriages operating the through-train from Beijing to Pyongyang are attached to the daily overnight train from Beijing to Dandong. In addition, there are North Korean carriages that form a daily dedicated Dandong–Pyongyang train.

=== Road ===
- China National Highway 201
- China National Highway 304
- G11 Hegang–Dalian Expressway
- G1113 Dandong–Fuxin Expressway

From the long-distance bus station, it takes about ten hours to get to Beijing, four hours to Dalian and Tonghua, and three hours to Shenyang.

=== Air ===
Dandong Langtou Airport is located 13 miles west of the city.

=== Ports and waterways ===
The Port of Dandong is located at the mouth of the Yalu River. It is bordered by the Yellow Sea in the south and separated from North Korea in the east. It was set up as a trading port in 1907. Since large-scale construction began in the mid-1980s, the port, together with those at Dalian and Yingkou, has become an important distributing centre in northeast China.

In October 2011, the Chinese government announced a $7.1 billion, five-year expansion plan of the port. Dai Yulin, secretary of the Dandong City Committee of the Chinese Communist Party, noted that Dandong's unique geography ensures that the city is a hub for land–sea transportation, connecting 90 ports in over 70 countries. Several multinational companies, including the US-owned Harman, have made Dandong the location for their northeast Asian headquarters.

The waterways near the port have become an important tourist attraction in the region and include the Yalu River Park.

== Landmarks ==
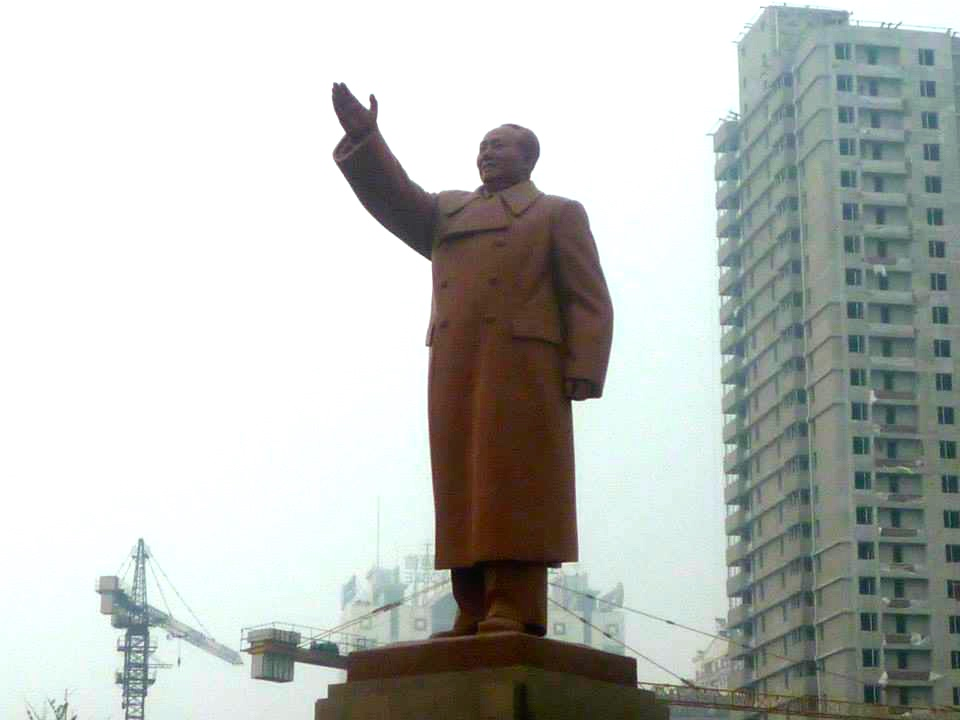
Statue of Mao Zedong opposite the railway station (2014)

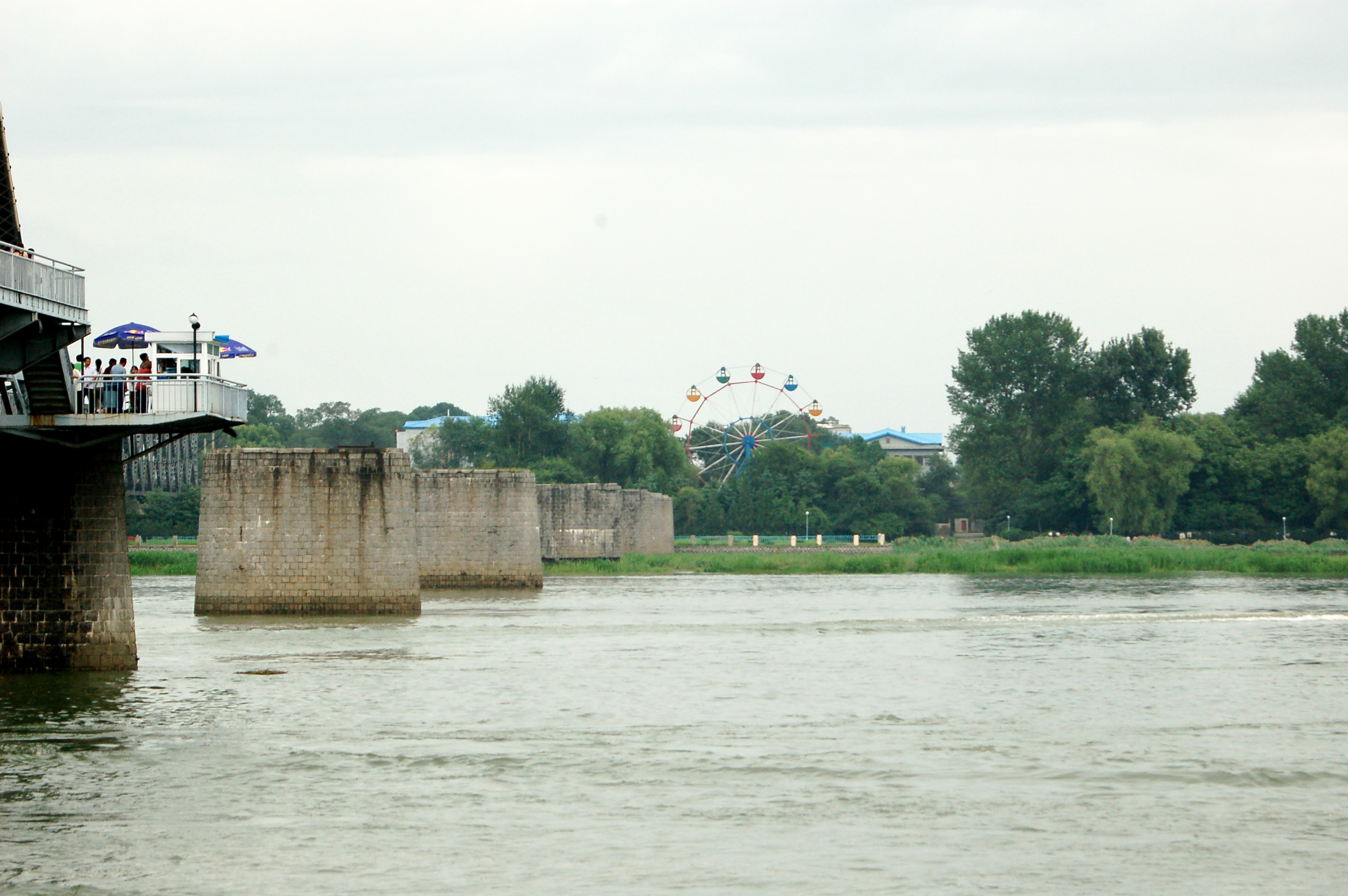
North Korean Ferris wheel with "Broken Bridge" in foreground (2008)

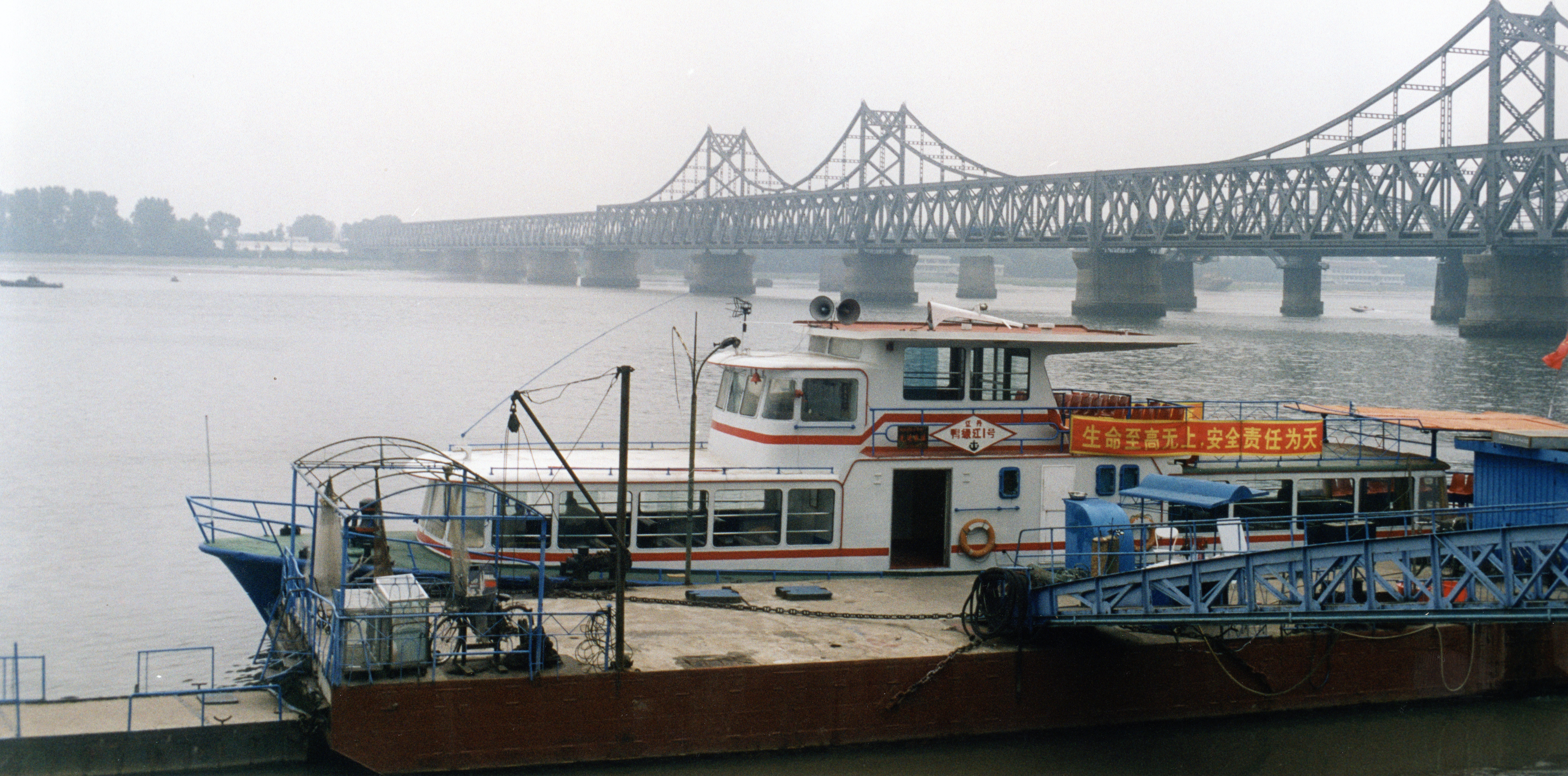
Friendship Bridge view from Dandong (2002)

Dandong is across the river from Sinuiju, North Korea. The two cities are connected by the Sino–Korean Friendship Bridge. Less than 100 meters downstream is the Yalu River Broken Bridge, which was destroyed by American bombing during the Korean War. Tourists can rent speed boats or passenger boats to approach the border and get a closer look at Sinuiju. There is a Ferris wheel in Sinuiju, visible from across the Yalu River.

Other tourist attractions include the Memorial of the War to Resist US Aggression and Aid Korea, also known as the Korean War Museum, and Jinjiang Mountain (锦江山), which used to be a Chinese army lookout and is now the city's largest park.

Outside of central Dandong, there are other landmarks, such as the Dagushan Scenic Area in Donggang, Shuifeng Dam in Kuandian Manchu Autonomous County, and Fenghuang Mountain in Fengcheng.

== Culture ==
=== Cuisine ===
Dandong fried fork seed noodle (丹东炒叉子) is a characteristic snack made of rice fork seeds and yellow clam meat, leek, carrot, and onion. It is stir-fried with seasonings such as minced garlic and sesame oil. Rice fork is a Manchu food in the early days, made from corn, fermented and ground into watery noodles and then made into smooth strips of chopstick thickness by hand or mold after settling.

=== Specialty ===
Dandong yellow clams (丹东黄蚬子) are grown at the mouth of the Yalu River, where nutrients are abundant and the water temperature is suitable. The clams are bigger and fatter than those from other places. Yellow clams were registered as a national geographical indication by the Chinese Ministry of Agriculture in 2011.

== Friendship cities ==
Dandong is a Sister City with the following cities:

- Paris, France (2008)
- Uijeongbu, Gyeonggi-do, South Korea (1997)
- Astrakhan, Astrakhan Oblast, Russia (1993)
- Tokushima, Tokushima, Japan (1991)
- Doncaster, South Yorkshire, United Kingdom (1988)
- Wilmington, North Carolina, United States (1986)
