= David Spindler =

American independent scholar

David Spindler is an independent American scholar and an authority on the Great Wall of China. Writing in The New Yorker in 2007, Peter Hessler called him "a leading expert on the Wall’s history and construction." He has made more than 400 trips to the Wall. Spindler's research focuses on the Ming Dynasty, and specifically how the Wall was used at that time in response to China's northern neighbors, the Mongols, who had conquered China once and might do again.

He attended Dartmouth College and Harvard Law School, studied as a graduate student at Peking University, and spent two years as a consultant at McKinsey & Company.

== Contributions ==
In 2010, his research paper "A Twice-Scorned Mongol Woman, the Raid of 1576, and the Building of the Brick Great Wall." was published in the journal Ming Studies, made available online in 2013.

In a review of recent work in the field, the scholar Arthur Waldron explained that Spindler resisted explanations that the Ming was "too weak to fight and too proud to talk," and so the rulers relied on walls that failed to protect them. He likewise resisted the symbolic explanation that the wall represented either xenophobia or chauvinism. Spindler held that in fact the Ming strategy was practical and flexible, using walls where they could be effective, such as around the capital. Waldron, however, adds that Spindler does not deal with the various roles that the wall played over the centuries as China changed.
