= Battle of Shanhaiguan (1900) =

1900 battle of the Boxer Rebellion

- Part of the Boxer Rebellion
Date	1900
Location	Shanhaiguan, China
Result	Inconclusive

Belligerents
United Kingdom	Qing China; Boxer movement

Commanders and leaders
(United Kingdom of Great Britain and Ireland) Edmund Barrow	(Qing dynasty) Song Qing

Strength
17,000	14,000

Casualties and losses
Unknown	Unknown

The Battle of Shanhaiguan took place in 1900 when Qing dynasty imperial troops and the Boxers engaged in combat against British forces.

== Chinese Forces ==
The permanent Chinese forces stationed at Shanhaiguan consisted of the left division under commanding officer General Song Qing. It consisted of two battalions, one under General Ma Yukun, however, both withdrew to Tianjin in June and July before the battle, which they did not participate in. In June Ma Yukun then received orders from Empress Dowager Cixi to enter Beijing, to crush the Boxer rebels along the way.

== Battle ==
Part of the Great Wall, the "old dragon head", was destroyed during the battle by the British during a sea attack. In response, Chinese Boxer forces responded with a counterstrike and destroyed the railroad nearby.

=== Honghuzi attacks ===
Louis Livingston Seaman wrote about an incident in which the Chinese Honghuzi bandits, who were also Boxers, captured, tortured, and executed Eight-Nation Alliance Sikh soldiers at Shanhaiguan:

In January, 1900, during the Boxer campaign (and the Hunghutzes were all Boxers in those days) I chanced to be on the Great Wall of China at Shan-HaiKwan, when a party of five sikhs, with two coolies and a cart, went through a gateway on a foraging expedition for wood. Shortly after one of the coolies rushed back, so frightened he could hardly articulate, and reported that a party of mounted Hung-hutzes had swooped down on the sikhs, who had carelessly neglected to take their arms, and had carried them off and stolen their ponies.

The coolies had escaped by hiding in a near-by nullah.

It was " boots and saddles," and in less time than one can write it, the Royal Bengal Lancers, Beluchis, and Gourkas were swarming over the hills in a vain hunt for their comrades and the Boxers. But they were late. Several hours after, they came upon the scene of torture. All was over. There remained only the mutilated remains of their companions and the inhuman instrument that had accomplished its deadly work.

The death instrument was a sort of iron cage, about eight feet high, made of rods fastened to a small ring at the base, resembling somewhat the steel frame of an umbrella on an enlarged scale. The rods were closed round the victim much as they are round the handle of a closed umbrella, and a rudely constructed nut or screw at the top forced them tightly together. In this infernal device the unfortunate sikhs had been forced, one after another, and as the screw was tightened and the flesh of the victim protruded between the bars, these fiends had sliced it off with their swords until the end came, and it came quickly."

=== Occupation ===
In September, Shanhaiguan was occupied by Britain, which wanted to prevent Russia from entering the area.

== See also ==
- First and Second Opium Wars
