= Zhao Jingbo =

Chinese politician

- 赵静波

Communist Party Secretary of Jilin City
- In office December 2014 – April 2017
- Preceded by: Zhang Xiaopei
- Succeeded by: Zhang Huanqiu

Mayor of Jilin City
- In office April 2011 – January 2015
- Preceded by: Zhang Xiaopei
- Succeeded by: Zhang Huanqiu

Personal details
- Born: October 1964 (age 62) Changchun, Jilin, China
- Party: Chinese Communist Party (1994–2019; expelled)

Chinese name
- Simplified Chinese: 赵静波
- Traditional Chinese: 趙靜波
Transcriptions
Standard Mandarin
- Hanyu Pinyin: Zhào Jìngbō

Zhao Jingbo (Chinese: 赵静波; born October 1964) is a former Chinese politician who spent his entire career in northeast China's Jilin province. He was investigated by the Central Commission for Discipline Inspection in April 2019. Previously he served as deputy secretary-general of Jilin Provincial People's Government, and before that, mayor and Chinese Communist Party Committee Secretary of Jilin City.

== Biography ==
Zhao was born in Changchun, Jilin, in October 1964.

He joined the Chinese Communist Party (CCP) in December 1994. In 2000, he served in Jilin Provincial Department of Communications for eight years before becoming vice mayor of Jilin City in June 2008. In April 2011, he was named acting mayor of Jilin City, succeeding Zhang Xiaopei. He was installed as mayor in January 2012. In December 2014, he was promoted to CCP Committee Secretary of the city. It would be his first job as "first-in-charge" of a city. In April 2017, he was appointed deputy secretary-general of Jilin Provincial People's Government, and held that office until July 2017.

=== Downfall ===
On 15 April 2019, he was put under investigation for alleged "serious violations of discipline and laws" by the Central Commission for Discipline Inspection (CCDI), the CCP's internal disciplinary body, and the National Supervisory Commission, the highest anti-corruption agency of China. Four CCP committee secretaries of Jilin City, namely Zhou Huachen, Xu Jianyi and Tian Xueren, were also sacked for graft. On October 9, he was expelled from the CCP and removed from public office. On November 21, he was indicted on suspicion of accepting bribes.

On 15 October 2021, he stood trial at the Intermediate People's Court of Baishan on charges of taking bribes. He was charged with accepting money and property worth over 63.59 million ($ million) personally or through his family members. According to the indictment, he allegedly took advantage of his positions to seek benefits for others in enterprise operation, project construction, project contracting and job adjustment between 2000 and 2018. He received a sentence of 15 years in prison and fine of 5 million yuan for taking bribes.

Government offices
Preceded by Zhang Xiaopei	Mayor of Jilin City; 2011–2015	Succeeded by Zhang Huanqiu
Party political offices
Preceded by Zhang Xiaopei	Communist Party Secretary of Jilin City; 2014–2017	Succeeded by Zhang Huanqiu
