= Xiao Hui Wang =

Chinese artist, author and socialite

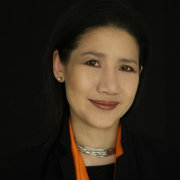
- Artist, author
- Born: Tianjin, China

Xiao Hui Wang (Chinese: 王小慧; pinyin: Wáng Xiǎohuì) is a Chinese artist, author and socialite who works mainly in photography, sculpture, design, and media art. Her work has been exhibited internationally, and she has been the recipient of numerous awards and honors; the city of Suzhou has named an art institution after her (the Xiao Hui Wang Art Museum), a rare honor for a living artist. She has been profiled by the prestigious Hong Kong magazine Phoenix Weekly as one of the Top Fifty Most Influential Chinese Worldwide. She has been a professor at Shanghai's Tongji University since 2003, where she runs the Xiao Hui Wang Art Center. She divides her time between China and Germany.

== Early life ==
Xiao Hui Wang was born in Tianjin. Her mother was a music professor and her father an engineer. She grew up during the Great Leap Forward and the Cultural Revolution, a hard time for "black" (politically suspect) cultural families such as hers. In 1978, she enrolled at Tongji University to study architecture, receiving a bachelor's degree in the discipline in 1983. A few years later, in 1986, she received a Masters in Architecture from the same university, and married classmate (and promising architect) Yu Lin.

Subsequently, as recipients of scholarships from the German government, both she and her husband moved to Germany to study further. Between 1987 and 1991, she studied a PhD at the Technical University of Munich; and between 1990 and 1992, she studied at the Munich Film Academy. In 1991, on the way to Prague, a fatal car crash took her husband's life and left Wang in the hospital. Having dabbled in photography since she was 13, she unexpectedly began to document her recovery visually. As the days went on, she took pictures of her hospital bed, of herself in her recovering state, of her hospital room, of her doctor, of friends who visited her. This critical experience gradually transformed her, giving her life new meaning and influencing her decision to become a professional artist.

== Professional life ==
In 1992, after her recovery, she began holding photographic exhibitions again. Her first one during this period was held in Munich. The second one, in 1993, was held in Berlin.

Aside from her photographic activities, she also began working on numerous film and television projects in Europe. She wrote scripts for the Bayerischer Rundfunk series Kulturen der Welt in that same year; then, in 1993, she was a consultant for the Sino-German documentary Families in Beijing: Courtyard House. In 1994, she wrote and directed her surrealistic art film The Broken Moon, efforts which won awards in Germany and Austria.

In 1995, she was the artistic supervisor for The Chair, a Sino-Japanese production, and wrote a screenplay called Blue Candle Burnt Out. She directed a documentary film on Peking Opera in 1996.

In 1997, she held three photographic exhibits, two in Germany and one in China; six more would follow between 1998 and 2001, one in Switzerland, two in China and the rest in Germany. She won three awards during this time.

In 2001, she was invited to become a professor at her alma mater, Tongji University, and founded the Xiao Hui Wang Art Center in 2003. In 2008, the Center won the international design competition for the 2010 Shanghai Expo Urban Footprint Theme Pavilion. Wang's growing reputation led to further work with international brands (Christofle, BASF, BMW, Cartier, A. Lange & Söhne, Jaeger-LeCoultre, Audi and Van Cleef & Arpels among others) and large-scale art projects from Chinese local governments.

=== Cooperation with brands ===
In 2004, Wang organized an exhibition of her works (titled Boundless) for BMW in Munich. The exhibition attracted over 90,000 people, 5% of the city's population at the time. She also presided over a series of tie-in events titled "Dialogue between East and West", broadcast live on television. In attendance were Christian Ude (Mayor of Munich) and his wife Edith von Welser-Ude, Chinese Minister of Technology Wan Gang, Marketing Director of BMW Germany Dr. Wolfgang Armbrecht, architect Albert Speer Jr., writer Tilman Spengler, Prof. Dr. Guan Yuqian and banker Peter von Guretzky.

In 2005, BASF invited her to organize a creative photography contest. Over 26,000 submissions were received.

In 2010, Wang was asked by BMW MINI to design the "Car of Dreams". Its unveiling, MINI RELOADED, was part of the 2010 Dream Plan, a corresponding, highly publicized event in Shanghai which showcased 10000 Dreams, her multimedia work that centered on the written, painted, photographed and videotaped aspirations of 10,000 youths. The opening ceremony attracted 1000 visitors.

In 2011, Wang became the first Asian artist to design and produce limited-edition silver goods for renowned silverware brand Christofle (other artists who had worked with the brand in this manner are Man Ray, Jean Cocteau, Roger Tallon and Andree Putman). She also arrived at similar arrangements with Meissen in 2010 and Misis in 2014, producing limited-edition works and jewelry for these brands.

In 2012, Wang was invited to exhibit for Audi at the Shanghai Art Gallery. Other exhibiting artists included Zhang Huan, Tan Dun, Sun Liang and Miao Xiaochun.

=== Cooperation with governments ===
In 2004, Wang organized an event for the Hangzhou government titled "Hanghzou – In the Eyes of German Photographers". It showcased the work of ten German photographers who chose Hangzhou as their subject, and who received Certificates of Honor from the mayor of said city. A commemorative album (West Lake Charms) was also published. Zhao Wuji visited the exhibition.

In 2007, the government of Tianjin held a momentous retrospective exhibition of her work at the Tianjin Art Museum. Wang was also invited to give an academic seminar at the city's library in 2008; two government ministers from Beijing travelled to attend the opening ceremony, which included a speech from Mayor of Munich Christian Ude advocating Wang. The city also asked Wang to design a Creative Industry Park to renovate the city's old industrial area.

In 2008, Chinese government telephone company China Unicom asked Wang to design a series of telephone cards based on her artwork (Eros of Flowers and My Last 100 Years). It was the same year the Xiao Hui Wang Art Center entered and won the design competition for the Urban Footprint Pavilion of the 2010 Shanghai World Expo (over 70 design firms from all over the globe had competed for the opportunity). The project brought the Center exposure to millions of people from around the world and commissions for further projects.

In 2010, Chinese Deputy Minister of Finance Zhang Shaochun visited the Xiao Hui Wang Art Center in Shanghai to explore collaborative projects with Wang, as did Latin American and the Caribbean Unit Chief of UNESCO Nuria Sanz in 2013.

Also in 2010, Wang became the first Asian artist to design stamps for Liechtenstein and to hold exhibitions in the Vaduz Culture Centre.

In 2011, Wang's Art Center designed large-scale multimedia and light projections for the ancient quarters of Datong. That same year, the center also provided the general design for the 13,000 m2 Langfang Project Centre as well as its outdoor artworks and multimedia projection. The Center also designed the outdoor art of the Tianjin Innov-China eGroup Building, another project for which it was the general designer.

In 2012, the Center designed the Nanjing World Trade Center Multimedia Exhibition Hall, which included a permanent multimedia installation, and multimedia projections for the city of Nantong. In the same year, the government of Suzhou invited Wang to head its cultural advisory board, granting her a Ming dynasty mansion in which to base a museum and commissions for cultural projects. Among the latter undertaken was the Suzhou Creative and Design Industry Cultural Expo held in 2013. The mansion, renovated as the Xiao Hui Wang Art Museum, opened its doors later that year.

=== Lectures and competition judgeships ===
In 2007, Wang gave a lecture on entrepreneur culture at the WirtschaftsWoche Annual Conference. Other speakers included the mayors of Berlin and Düsseldorf, the CEOs of Siemens and Deutsche Bank, the president of the Asia-Pacific Association and the Chinese ambassador to Germany.

In 2008, Wang was invited to exhibit and give a lecture at the Richemont Annual Conference in Shanghai. The president of Richemont and many CEOs of Richemont brands purchased much of her art for their collections.

The same year, Wang acted as a judge for the My Style talent show finale by Shanghai TV's Channel Young. She was also a judge and presenter for the 2008 and 2009 Media Awards by L'Oréal held in Shanghai.

In 2009, Wang gave a lecture about German design at a Volkswagen CC press conference. She gave one on environmental protection in Germany for the China Eagle Group at the 21st Century Business Herald conference and one about art investment at the 6th China International Finance Forum.

Wang was also a judge (and awards presenter) and for the 2009 and 2010 Swire Properties Photography Competition sponsored by Shanghai Media Group.

In 2010, Wang gave a speech at Harvard University in Boston titled "The Art of Representing China". She also gave a speech on branding and art at the TOPSUR Real Estate Development Trends Forum Real Estate Pioneer Theme Salon and two speeches on elegance in the 1950s for VIP guests of watch company Omega's Ladymatic event at the Peace Hotel in Shanghai.

In 2011, she participated as a judge and guest for the international Montblanc Art Sponsorships, which were chaired by pianist Lang Lang. In addition, she gave lectures at the Hong Kong Asia World Expo (to an audience of 2500), the Female Elite Forum in Shanghai and the Tongji University Academic Culture Festival. She was also interviewed on International Channel Shanghai's Talk to Lei and by American talk show host Nancy Merrill that same year.

In 2012, Wang spoke at the 5th Shanghai TV Culture and Arts Channel Forum, the Pudong Reading Festival and the South China Book Fair in Guangzhou. She was also a judge for the 3rd New Star Art Festival in Nanjing and for the Women's Day Chinese and Foreign Family Cooking Competition in Suzhou that same year.

In 2013, Wang gave an elite "Humanism and Art" master class at Jiaotong University in Shanghai.

=== Public activities ===
In 2002, Wang was asked by the German government to hold an art show with Jörg Immendorff in Beijing's China Millenium Monument to celebrate 30 years of Sino-German diplomatic relations.

In 2004, Wang was named Goodwill Ambassador for Shanghai Week in Hamburg. Zhou Muyao, the Deputy Mayor of Shanghai, attended the ceremony.

In 2007, Wang participated in a charity auction for the Pinakothek der Moderne Munich organized by Christie's. Her works obtained the highest bids in the photography category.

In 2008, Wang participated in a charity auction held in Cologne and organized by BFF and Lempertz for the victims of the 2008 Sichuan earthquake.

In 2009, Wang presented Christian Ude with an Honorary Professorship Badge at Tongji University during his official visit as Mayor of Munich. He also accompanied him to meet the mayors of Shanghai and Hangzhou (Han Zheng and Cai Qi respectively).

In addition, Wang participated in a UNAIDS press conference launching a book the Xiao Hui Wang Art Center supported, and hosted a charity event held by Consular Spouses Shanghai.

In 2010, Wang met with Mexican President Felipe Calderon, the Mexican Culture Minister and the Chinese ambassador to Mexico Yin Henming in Mexico City. She also met with the first lady of Estonia Evelin Ilves when the latter made an official visit to the Xiao Hui Wang Art Center, and hosted the opening ceremony in Nagoya of the Sino-Japanese Association for Culture, Tourism and Business.

Wang also participated in the Maternal and Infant Health Charity Gala Dinner and Auction organized by the Soong Ching-ling Foundation. Her Red Child No. 96 photograph raised RMB 110,000.

In 2011, the Xiao Hui Wang Art Center was the site for Dulux's "Let's Colour Week" art charity event.

In 2012, Wang was interviewed for a documentary (China Pioniere) celebrating 40 years of Sino-German diplomatic relations.

In 2013, Wang donated works from her Isolated Paradise series to the Pearl S. Buck Charitable Fund.

=== Exhibitions ===
- 2014
- Frauenbilder in der zeitgenössischen Fotographie, Mercedes Benz, Munich
  - Annual chairman Session of Top Realtors Alliance•Xiao Hui Wang Art Derivatives Exhibition, Inter Continental Hotels & Resorts, Nanjing
  - Beyond Architecture, China Design Centre at The Building Centre, London
  - Beyond Architecture, Casa dell’ Architettura, Rome
- 2013
  - Shanghai-Die Erfindung der Zukunft, Pasinger Fabrik, Munich
  - Top Marques Shanghai, Shanghai Exhibition Center
  - Flowers & Mushrooms, Museum der Morderne, Salzburg, group show
- 2012
  - Heartbeat Shanghai, Shanghai Gallery of Art, Shanghai
  - Beauty Obsecured, Elisabeth de Brabant Art Center, Shanghai
  - Solo exhibition with new works (sculptures, installation, light and multimedia art), Himalaya Art Museum, Shanghai
- 2011
  - Xiao Hui Wang and Her Selected Work, Top Marques Macau, Macau, solo show
  - La Biennale Alessandria, Caserma Giletti, Alessandria
- 2010
  - Xiao Hui Wang Anniversary Solo, Elisabeth de Brabant Art Center, Shanghai
  - Film and Multimedia Works of Xiao Hui Wang, Harvard University, Boston
  - Xiao Hui Wang and 10,000 Dreams (Photograph, Video, Art Installation and Multi-Media), Shanghai Sculpture Museum, Shanghai
  - Xiao Hui Wang and her work, Hammer Gallery, Zurich, solo show
  - Xiao Hui Wang Solo Show, 1933 Art Pavilion, Shanghai, solo show
  - Flourishing Eros, Art Karlsruhe (Art Seasons Gallery), Karlsruhe

Chinese Contemporary Art, Gasometer Art Center, Lichtenstein

- 2009
  - Inner Dialogue, Elisabeth de Brabant Art Center, Shanghai
  - Xiao Hui Wang Solo Show, Art Seasons Gallery, St. Moritz

Xiao Hui Wang Art Salon, YongFoo Elite, Shanghai, solo show

  - Xiao Hui Wang Exhibition, Suzhou Boji Creative Industry Park, solo show
  - Red Child, Frankfurt Ausstellungshalle, Frankfurt, solo show
  - Xiao Hui Wang Solo Show, Galerie Maurer, Frankfurt
  - Xiao Hui Wang Solo Show, Roppongi Art Center, Tokyo
  - The Eros of Flowers—Xiao Hui Wang Solo Show, Elisabeth de Brabant Art Center, Shanghai, solo show
  - Metropolis Now! – A Selection of Chinese Contemporary Art, Meridian International Center, Washington
  - Scene exhibition, River South Art Center, Shanghai
  - Joint Exhibition-Xiao Hui Wang and Ma Shuqing, ShangFang Garden, Elisabeth de Brabant Art Center, Shanghai
- 2008
  - Shanghai Women – Between Reality and Unreality, Art Seasons Gallery, Zurich
  - Isolated Paradise, Elisabeth de Brabant private villa, Shanghai
  - Shanghai Women, Pingyao International Photography Festival, Pingyao
  - Shanghai Women, Galerie an der Pinakothek der Moderne, Munich
  - Xiao Hui Wang – Two Decades of Photography, Art Masters, St. Moritz
  - Shanghai Women – Between Reality and Unreality, Galerie an der Pinakothek der Moderne, Munich
  - Asia Contemporary in Basel, Art Basel, Union Basel
  - My Last 100 Years, CinaviCina Festival, Rome
  - Shanghai Women, Shanghai Art Fair, (Galerie An der Pinakothek der Moderne), Shanghai
  - Red Child, Shanghai Contemporary, (Art Seasons Gallery), Shanghai
  - China Academic Culture 2008—Contemporary Art Exhibition, 99 art center, Shanghai
- 2007
  - Red Child/ Self-extrication (performance), TS1 space, 798 Festival, Beijing
  - Between Two Worlds, Retrospective Exhibition, Tianjin Art Museum / Shanghai Contemporary Art Fair, (Walter Storms Gallery/Felix Ringel Gallery)
- 2006
  - Erotic Flowers, Camera Work, Berlin, Art Basel (group show)
  - My Last 100 Years, Pusan Biennale, Korean
  - My Last 100 Years, Shanghai Biennale, Moma Shanghai / Auction by Pinapothek der Moderne/Christie's, Munich.
- 2005
  - Grenzenlos, Photography, Video/Multimedia Installation, BMW Group Berlin;
  - Erotic Flowers, Camera Work, Hamburg
  - Erotic Flowers, Red Mansion Foundation, London (group show)
  - Erotic Flowers, Art Basel (group show)
  - Fantastic Asia, Museum of Art, Seoul
  - Erotic Flowers, Paris Photo, (Scalo Gallery) (group show).
- 2004
  - Art in Bloom, Upper Eastside Townhouse, New York
  - Between Two Worlds, Club Na Brestskoy / House of Photography, Fotobiennale, Moscow
  - Grenzenlos Photography, Video/Multimedia Installation, BMW Group Pavilion, Munich (moderation and design of a series of cultural events ‘‘Dialogue Between East and West’‘ )
  - Erotic Flowers, Garlerie Scalo, Zurich
  - A-live, Art Museum of China Academy of Art, Hangzhou
  - Erotic Flowers, Art Cologne (Storms Gallery)
  - Erotic Flowers, Photo New York (Scalo Gallery)
- 2003
  - Two People Show, with Jock Sturges, European Art Expo, Walter Storms Gallery, Duesseldorf
  - The Eros of Flowers, (Photography, Video/Multimedia Installation), Shanghai Art Museum, Shanghai
- 2002
  - Abstracting Flowers, Gallery Elo Art, Ischia
  - A Blaze of Colours, Taiwan International Arts Center (TIVAC), Taipeh
  - Abstracting Flowers, Gallery Elo Art, Ischia
  - Conceptualising Photography, International Fotofestival Pingyao, Shanxi
  - Roter Lotus, Walter Storms Galerie, Munich
  - Looking Inside Out: Conceptualising Photography, Photography and Multimedia Show, Millenium Exhibition Center, Beijing
  - Close to the Eyes, Exhibition Centerol the Bavarian Insurance Co., Munich
  - Woman and Self-Portraits, German Cultural Center, Taipeh
  - Thai Night Landscape, Photokina, Cologne (group show)
- 2001
  - Abstract Photography, Photogalerie im Kulturzentrum, Mannheim
  - Die Schaukel, Das Gelbe Haus Museum, Flims / Switzerland (group show).
- 1999
  - Xiao Hui Wang Photography, Arts Center, Hong Kong
- 1998
  - Century Woman, National Museum of Art, Peking (group show)
  - Contemporary Photo Art from China and Xiao Hui Wang, Kunsthalle Darmstadt
  - Frauenbilder, Photogalerie, No Name, Basel.
- 1997
  - Photographic Review, Art Museum, Shanghai
  - Visual Diary and Associations with Death International Photo Festival, Herten, Germany
  - Visual Diary etc., Aktionsforum Praterinsel, Munich.
- 1993
  - China Avantgarde, Haus der Kulturen der Welt, Berlin.
- 1992
  - Xiao Hui Wang Photography, AGFA Center, Munich.
- 1990
  - Licht und Widerschein, Werkbund Galerie, Berlin
  - Support Exhibition, Kuenstlerwerkstatt, Munich (group show).

== Reception ==
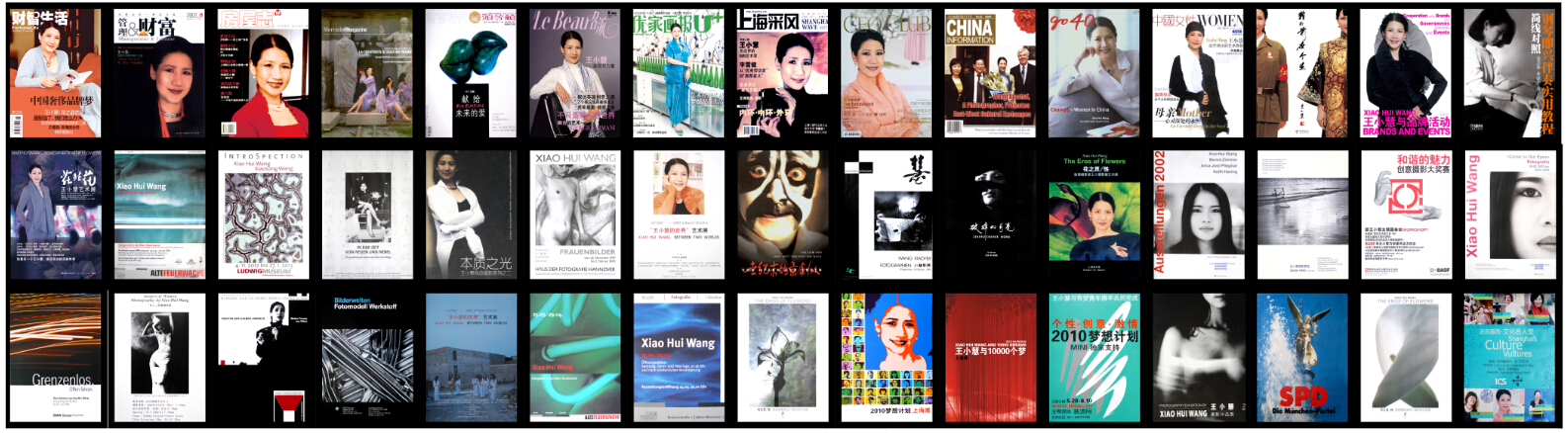
Books and magazines featuring Wang

Books and magazines featuring Wang.

Manfred Schneckenburger has described her as "an icon of progress for the younger generation despite the Chinese consciousness of tradition". Her work has mainly focused on three great, occasionally overlapping themes: aestheticism, vitality and humanity. Art critic Beate von Reifenscheid, in an essay about her, wrote that:

"Xiao Hui Wang's photography has been characterized by an especially penetrating quality of vision – one that tells us about people, about the contexts of their lives, about existence at the limits of psychological endurance, about loneliness and despair. However, she also traces the beauty of the human figure in her photos, the erotic tension between man and woman, the lives of women in seedy 'clubs', and even the eroticism of flowers, whose charged sexuality goes beyond that of Robert Mapplethorpe's black-and-white photographs".

Zhang Jianxing, Chairman of the Tianjin Photography Association, considers it immanently metaphorical, writing "Why are Xiao Hui Wang's many moments so powerful? The answer lies in the fact that what she captures with the lens of her camera is not only concrete objects, but also the spirit that is innate in those objects (...). The flowers in Xiao Hui Wang's photos are not flowers, water is not water, fog is not fog". Her art has also been considered intensely personal: Chinese art historian Gu Zheng called her self-portraits the "most brutally honest (...) in the history of photography". Art critic and professor Victoria Lu, describing her art as "the continuous record of her life", compares her to Frida Kahlo.

== Works ==
=== Photography ===
- My Visual Diary (1986-ongoing)
- Nanophotography (2011/2012)
- Isolated Paradise (2009)
- 10000 Dreams (2008)
- Early Temptation (2008)
- Lost Angels (2008)
- Shanghai Girls (2008)
- My Last 100 Years (2005–2007)
- Red Child (2002–2007)
- The Eros of Flowers (1999–2004)
- Close to the Eye (1996–2000)
- Abstract Photography (2000–2002)
- Landscapes (1986–1998)
- Women of the Night (1993)
- Yin and Yang (1990–1992)
- Searching in Dreams (1986–1990)
- Self-extrication

=== Sculpture ===
- Glass and Ceramic Art with Czech Craftsmen (2012)
- untitled(sculpture with light) (2012)
- LOVE (2011)
- Sun and Moon(2011)
- Barbie (2009)
- Fruits of Life (mehrere Arbeiten) (2008)

=== Installation ===
- Installation (2012)
- Green (2012)
- 10000 Dreams (2010)
- Self-extrication (2011)
- Red Child (2008)
- We are the World (2004–2005)
- Boundless Freedom (2004–2005)
- A-live (2003)

=== Film and video ===
- The Broken Moon (1994; short film, 35 mm, 15 min.)
- Peking Opera (1996; documentary, 60 min., shown in 6 European countries)
- Pear Blossoms (2004; short film, 3 min.)
- Timetrace (Water) (2004; video installation, 7 min.)
- Timetrace (Light) (2004; video installation, 7 min.)

=== Books ===
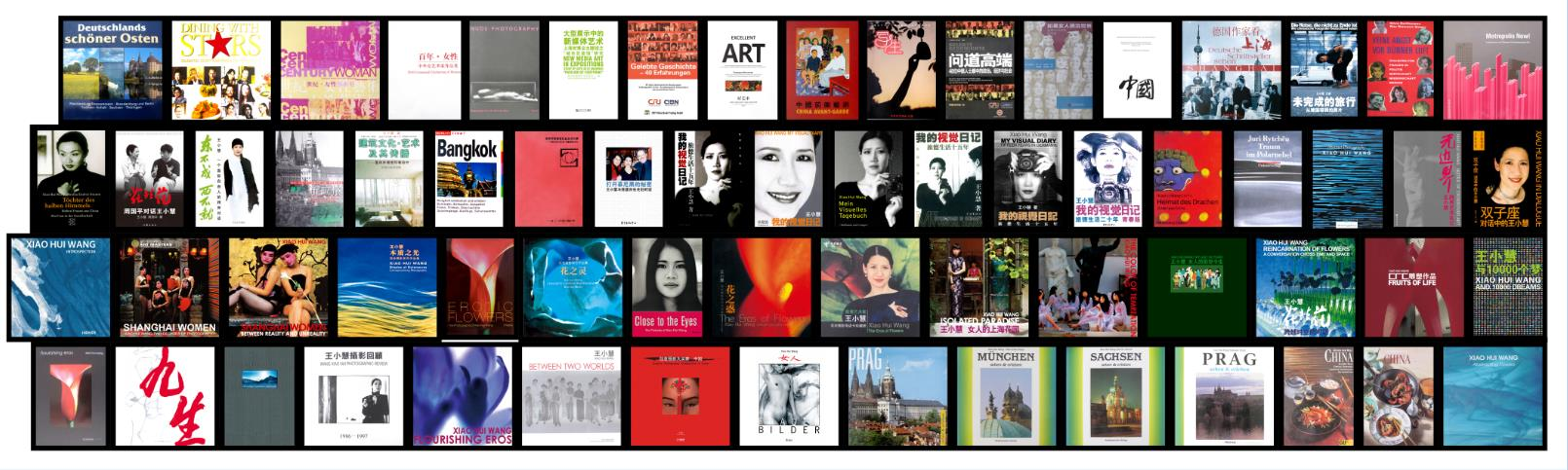
Books published or written by Wang

Books written or published by Wang.

- Sehen und Erleben – München (1991)
- Sehen und Erleben – Prag (1992)
- Sehen und Erleben – Sachsen (1992)
- Merian Live – Bangkok, GU Verlag (1993)
- Keine Angst vor dünner Luft (1993)
- Women, Edition Braus (1997)
- Töchter des halben Himmels, S. Fischer Verlag (German, 2000)
- Architecture and Its Communication, Bai Hua Culture and Art Publishing House (2000)
- Conceptualising Photography-Beyond Being Gu Ji Publishing House (Chinese, 2001)
- My Visual Diary – 15 Years in Germany (Chinese, 2001)
- Close to the Eyes (2001)
- Abstract Photography – Xiao Hui Wang, Kehrer (2001)
- Conceptualising Photography – Shades of Existences, People's Art Publishing House (2002)
- Conceptualising Photography – The Eros of Flowers, Shanghai Culture Publishing House (2003)
- Let's Go to Prague in Spring, Gu Ji Publishing House (2003)
- Erotic Flowers (2004)
- Xiao Hui Wang in Dialogue (Chinese, 2005)
- Samed Das Werk der Seele
- Mein Visuelles Tagebuch (German, 2006)
- Crossover Conversation of an Artist, People's Literature Publishing House (2012)
- Introspection, Hirmer (2012)

== Awards and honors ==
- Most Popular Lecturer by Fudan University (2015)
- Highest Achievement Award by the Chinese Traditional Aesthetics Research Institute (2014)
- Cultural Pioneer by Vivid Media (2014)
- Top Female Role Model and Excellent Designer by the city of Shanghai (2014)
- Honorary Member of Van Cleef & Arpels Jewelry School (2012)
- Most Internationally Influential Woman in Tianjin by Elegance magazine (2011)
- Most Internationally Influential Artist by Female Friend magazine (2011)
- 100 Most Influential Women of China by Insider magazine (2011)
- Most Successful Woman by Jessica magazine (2010)
- Top Fifty Most Influential Chinese Worldwide by Phoenix Weekly magazine (2009)
- Top Ten Leading Icons in the Creative Industry by the city of Shanghai (2009)
- Artist of the Year by Southern Media Group (2008)
- Keys to the City of Anting (2008)
- International Star Artist Award at the St. Moritz Art Masters (2008)
- Keys to the City of Anting (2008)
- Jaguar Gorgeous Award for Artists (2008)
- International Photographer of the Year Award by Shanghai Media Group (2007)
- Sino-German Friendship Award from the German government (2007)
- Named Honorary Member of the German Association of Freelance Photographers (BFF) (2005)
- Female Author's Award for My Visual Diary (2003)
- Shanghai Book Award and Bingxin Award (National Literature) Award for My Visual Diary (2002)
- Eric-Salomon PhotographyAward during Photokina Cologne (2002; shared with nine other photographers)
- Award for Excellence by Kodak (1997)
- Award for Photography by European Publishers (1997; Women [photobook])
- Special award at the Bludenz International Film Festival (1995)
- Award for Best Script by Bavarian Film Foundation (1991; The Broken Moon)
- National Award for Architectural Design, 3rd Place (1982, 1986)
