= Zhu Yuchen (business executive) =

Chinese business executive

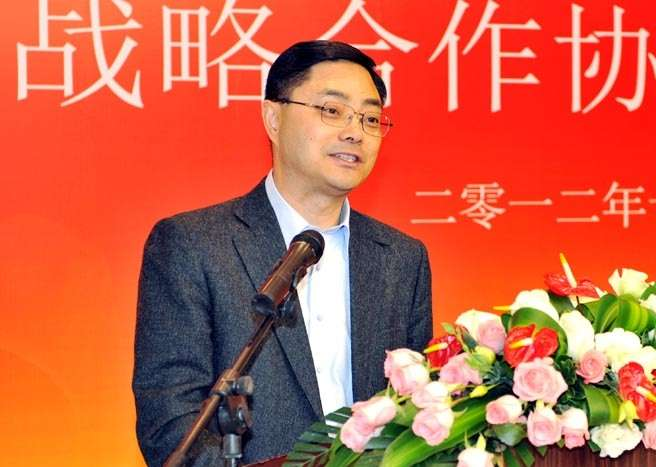

Zhu Yuchen (Chinese: 朱玉辰; pinyin: Zhū Yùchén; born 1961 in Kuandian, Liaoning Province, Manchu), also known as Eugene Zhu, is a Chinese business executive and one of the explorers and founders of the Chinese futures market. He is the former CEO of Dalian Commodity Exchange (DCE) and China Financial Futures Exchange (CFFEX). He is also the former chairman of the China Futures Association (CFA).

== Career ==
Following his tenure with Ministry of Commerce of the People's Republic of China (MOFCOM), Zhu Yuchen joined China Grain Trading Company in 1990, as the director of the National Grains Wholesale Market Management Office. From 1992 to 1996, he served as the Deputy CEO of China International Futures Co. Ltd. (CIFCO); Chairman & CEO of Shanghai CIFCO Futures Brokerage Co. Ltd; and CEO of Shenzhen CIFCO.

Since 1996, he served as the CEO and Communist Party Secretary of Dalian Commodity Exchange (DCE) for 10 years. During the term of service, he received his Ph.D. degree in Economics from Wuhan University in 1998. Under Zhu's leadership, DCE expanded into the largest commodity futures marketplace in China. As recorded by World Federation of Exchanges (WFE), DCE was ranked the largest commodity futures exchange in 2015 by trading volume.

In 2006, he was appointed as the CEO of China Financial Futures Exchange (CFFEX), where he oversaw the preparation, launch and operation of the first stock index futures contracts in China (i.e. CSI 300 Index futures contract). According to WFE, CFFEX was ranked the 3rd largest exchange globally in 2015 by the trading volume of stock index futures.

In August 2012, Zhu Yuchen was appointed as the vice chairman, CEO, and deputy Communist Party secretary of Shanghai Pudong Development Bank (SPD Bank, SH.600000). At the end of 2012 when he assumed this position, investment banking business was initiated as one of the key development strategies to drive the bank's business transformation. Since 2013, investment banking, wealth management and treasury & markets became the three fastest growing business segments for SPD Bank. SPD Bank was ranked 35th in Top 1000 World Banks in 2015 by "The Banker" in terms of tier I capital.

Zhu Yuchen has been a member of the National People's Congress since 2008. He was elected as the delegate to the 10th and 11th National People's Congress (NPC) and the delegate to the 12th National Committee of the Chinese People's Political Consultative Conference (CPPCC).

== Education and early life ==
Zhu Yuchen obtained his BA degree in economics from Dongbei University of Finance and Economics in 1983. After graduation, he worked as a senior officer for two years in the Purchase & Sale Division, Oil and Fats Bureau, MOFCOM. He returned to Dongbei University of Finance and Economics in 1985 and received his MA degree in economics in 1987.

Eugene continued his career in MOFCOM in 1987, as the secretary of the General Management Office, and then moved to the Policy Research Department as a vice director in 1988. During this tenure, he spent one year in Chicago Mercantile Exchange (CME) and Chicago Board of Trade (CBOT) as a visiting researcher.
