= Zhang Xiaopei =

- 张晓霈

Vice Chairman of the Jilin Provincial Committee of the Chinese People's Political Consultative Conference
- In office December 2014 – January 2018
- Chairman: Huang Yanming

Personal details
- Born: November 1957 (age 68) Luoyang, Henan, China
- Party: Chinese Communist Party (1984–2023; expelled)
- Education: Jilin University

Chinese name
- Simplified Chinese: 张晓霈
- Traditional Chinese: 張曉霈
Transcriptions
Standard Mandarin
- Hanyu Pinyin: Zhāng Xiǎo pèi

Zhang Xiaopei (Chinese: 张晓霈; born November 1957) is a former Chinese politician who spent his entire career in northeast China's Jilin province. He handed himself in to China's top anti-graft agency in November 2022. He has retired for four years. Previously he served as vice chairman of the Jilin Provincial Committee of the Chinese People's Political Consultative Conference.

He was a delegate to the 11th National People's Congress.

== Early life and education ==
Zhang was born in Luoyang, Henan, in November 1957. in 1978, he entered Jilin University of Technology (now Jilin University), where he majored in foundry.

== Career ==
After graduating in January 1982, he was assigned as deputy director of Workshop of Jilin City No. 1 Machinery Factory, and joined the Chinese Communist Party (CCP) in July 1984. Beginning in January 1986, he served in several posts in Jilin Chemical Industrial Company, including technician, deputy director, director of workshop, deputy director of the mechanical factory, director of the container stamping factory, and director and party secretary of the mechanical factory.

He began his political career in February 1998, when he was appointed deputy director of Jilin Municipal Economic and Trade Commission. He returned to Jilin Chemical Industrial Company in January 1999, and worked until December 2000. Then he became assistant manager and then manager of Jihua Group Co., Ltd. In December 2004, he was admitted to member of the CCP Jilin Municipal Committee, the city's top authority. He was appointed vice mayor of Jilin City in January 2005. In September 2006, he was named acting mayor, confirmed in January 2007. He rose to become party secretary, the top political position in the city, in April 2011. In December 2014, he was chosen as vice chairman of the Jilin Provincial Committee of the Chinese People's Political Consultative Conference, the provincial advisory body.

== Downfall ==
On 25 November 2022, he surrendered himself to the Central Commission for Discipline Inspection (CCDI), the party's internal disciplinary body, and the National Supervisory Commission, the highest anti-corruption agency of China.

On 28 June 2023, he was expelled from the CCP.

On 30 April 2024, he sentenced to nine years in prison and fined 3 million yuan for accepting bribes by the Intermediate People's Court of Heze. Prosecutors accused Zhang of taking advantage of his different positions in Jilin between 2004 and 2022 to seek profits for various companies and individuals in such matters as project contracting, land-use approvals and job promotions. In return, he accepted money and valuables worth a total of 69.34 million yuan (about 9.76 million U.S. dollars), personally or through his family members.

Government offices
Preceded by Xu Jianyi	Mayor of Jilin City; 2006–2011	Succeeded by Zhao Jingbo
Party political offices
Preceded by Zhou Huachen	Communist Party Secretary of Jilin City; 2011–2014	Succeeded by Zhao Jingbo
