= Xiao Hui Wang Art Center =

Art institute in Shanghai, China

- 王小慧艺术中心
- Established: 2003
- Location: 6C, High-tech Building, south campus of Tongji University, No. 67 Chifeng Road, Yangpu District, 200092, Shanghai, China
- Type: Contemporary Art, New Media Art
- Director: Xiao Hui Wang
- Public transit access: Shanghai Metro Line 10, Siping Road Station or Tongji University Station

The Xiao Hui Wang Art Center was an art institute at Tongji University, Shanghai. Founded in 2003, it was administered by Professor Xiao Hui Wang, and was known for its numerous commissioned urban design projects and for being the first art institute in China to focus on new media art. The Center closed in 2015.

== Design ==
Its design for the 2010 Shanghai Expo Urban Footprint Pavilion was chosen after international competition, and it worked with the Shanghai Museum, the sponsor and official organizer, to carry it out.

Other projects included urban art projects for the cities of Langfang, Datong, Nantong, Suzhou and Zhuhai, artistic design work for the Nanjing World Trade Center, the Tianjin Innovation-China e•Group building, the Zendai Radisson Hotel in Shanghai and numerous designs and multimedia installations for Christofle, BMW MINI, J. P. Morgan, Audi, Van Cleef & Arpels and Sergio Rossi among others.
