= Xialuhe Korean Ethnic Township =

Xialuhe Korean Ethnic Township: 下露河朝鲜族乡 (Chinese); 하로하조선족향 (Korean)
- Ethnic township
- Location in Liaoning
- Coordinates (Xialuhe Township government): 40°53′35″N 125°30′53″E
- Country: China
- Province: Liaoning
- Prefecture-level city: Dandong
- Autonomous county: Kuandian

Area
  - Total: 269.84 km^{2} (104.19 sq mi)

Population (2018)
  - Total: 10,887
  - Density: 40.346/km^{2} (104.50/sq mi)
- Time zone: UTC+8 (China Standard)

Xialuhe Korean Ethnic Township (simplified Chinese: 下露河朝鲜族乡; traditional Chinese: 下露河朝鮮族鄉; pinyin: Xiàlùhé Cháoxiǎnzú Xiāng), also known as Haroha Korean Ethnic Township (Korean: 하로하조선족향; Hanja: 下露河朝鮮族鄕; RR: Haroha Joseonjok Hyang; MR: Haroha Chosŏnjok Hyang), is an ethnic township in Kuandian Manchu Autonomous County, Dandong, Liaoning Province, China. Located 63.8 kilometres (39.6 mi) east of the county center, the township spans an area of 269.84 square kilometres (104.19 mi^{2}), and is home to 10,887 people as of 2018.

== History ==
Throughout the 1920s on through the 1940s, the area of present-day Xialuhe was a hotbed of Korean independence armies, who often sparred with occupying Japanese forces.

In 1958, Xialuhe Township was created. Xialuhe was re-designated from a township to an ethnic township in 1987.

== Administrative divisions ==
Xialuhe is divided into 6 administrative villages.

- Majiazi/Magaja (马架子村, 마가자촌)
- Lianjiang (连江村)
- Tongjiang/Tonggang (通江村, 통강촌)
- Chuangou/Cheongu (川沟村, 천구촌)
- Shuanglian (双联村)
- Shuangguang (双广村)

== Demographics ==
Xialuhe Korean Ethnic Township has a population of 10,887 as of 2018.

As of 2010, the ethnic township had a population of 10,370, of which there are 5,371 males and 4,999 females. That year, there were 1,327 people aged 14 and under, 7,941 people aged 15 to 64, and 1,102 people aged 65 and up.

A 2009 estimate placed Xialuhe's population at about 11,200.

As of 2007, there were approximately 1,100 ethnic Koreans living in Xialuhe, however, Xialuhe's ethnic Korean population has declined in recent years, largely due to low birth rates, migration to urban areas, and emigration to South Korea. By the 2010s, a local Korean language newspaper reported that many schoolchildren in Xialuhe cannot speak Korean.

== Education ==
Since the establishment of the People's Republic of China, a number of bilingual schools teaching in both Mandarin Chinese and Korean have been established in Xialuhe. However, due to the decline in the local ethnic Korean population, a number of these schools have been closed or merged in recent years.
