= Xiao Hui Wang Art Museum =

Art museum in Suzhou, Jiangsu, China

- 王小慧艺术馆
- Established: 2013
- Location: Suzhou, China
- Type: Contemporary Art
- Director: Xiao Guanhong

The Xiao Hui Wang Art Museum is a contemporary art museum in Suzhou. It is notable for being one of the few museums in China named after a living artist.

== History ==
The museum is located in the historical Pingjiang District, in a specially renovated and refurbished 400-year-old Suzhou landmark called Ding Mansion. The original structure had been respectively built and rebuilt during the Ming (1368-1644) and Qing (1644-1912) dynasties, and has been left largely intact.

The museum holds four individual exhibition rooms, one large exhibition hall and a courtyard with a garden. It opened in 2013.
