= Shanghai Pudong Development Bank =

Chinese state-owned commercial bank

Shanghai Pudong Development Bank Co. Ltd

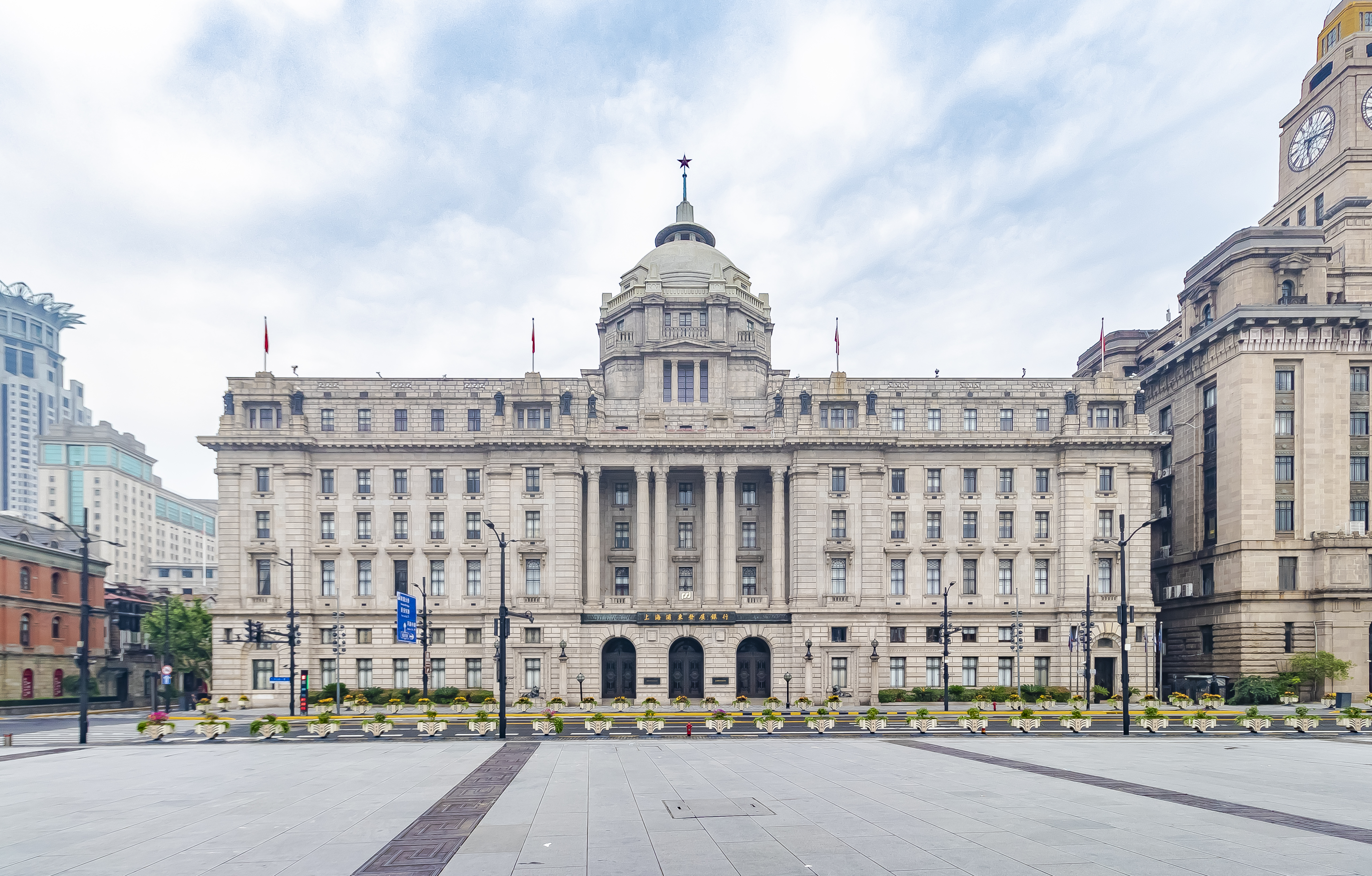
- The SPDB now occupies the HSBC Building, Shanghai on The Bund of Shanghai
- Native name: 上海浦东发展银行
- Type: Public company; State-owned enterprise
- Traded as: SSE: 600000
- Industry: Banking, finance
- Founded: 9 January 1993; 33 years ago
- Headquarters: Shanghai, China
- Key people: Gao Guofu (Chairman); Zhu Yuchen (President)
- Products: Financial services
- Website: www.spdb.com.cn

Shanghai Pudong Development Bank
- Chinese: 上海浦东发展银行
- Hanyu Pinyin: Shànghǎi Pǔdōng Fāzhǎn Yínháng
Transcriptions
Standard Mandarin
- Hanyu Pinyin: Shànghǎi Pǔdōng Fāzhǎn Yínháng

Shanghai Pudong Development Bank, branded as Pufa Bank in Chinese and SPD Bank in English, is a city-owned joint-stock commercial bank. It was established in 1993 and owned by the Shanghai Municipal Government.

Shanghai Pudong Development Bank issued a 400 million A-share offer on 23 September 1993, on the Shanghai Stock Exchange. It became the first shareholding commercial bank to list with both Central Bank and China Securities Regulatory Commission's approval since the enactment of "Commercial Bank Law" and "Securities Law". The registered capital reached RMB 2.41 billion. 320 million shares of the issue were listed on the Shanghai Stock Exchange on 10 November 1999 (stock code 600000).

== History ==
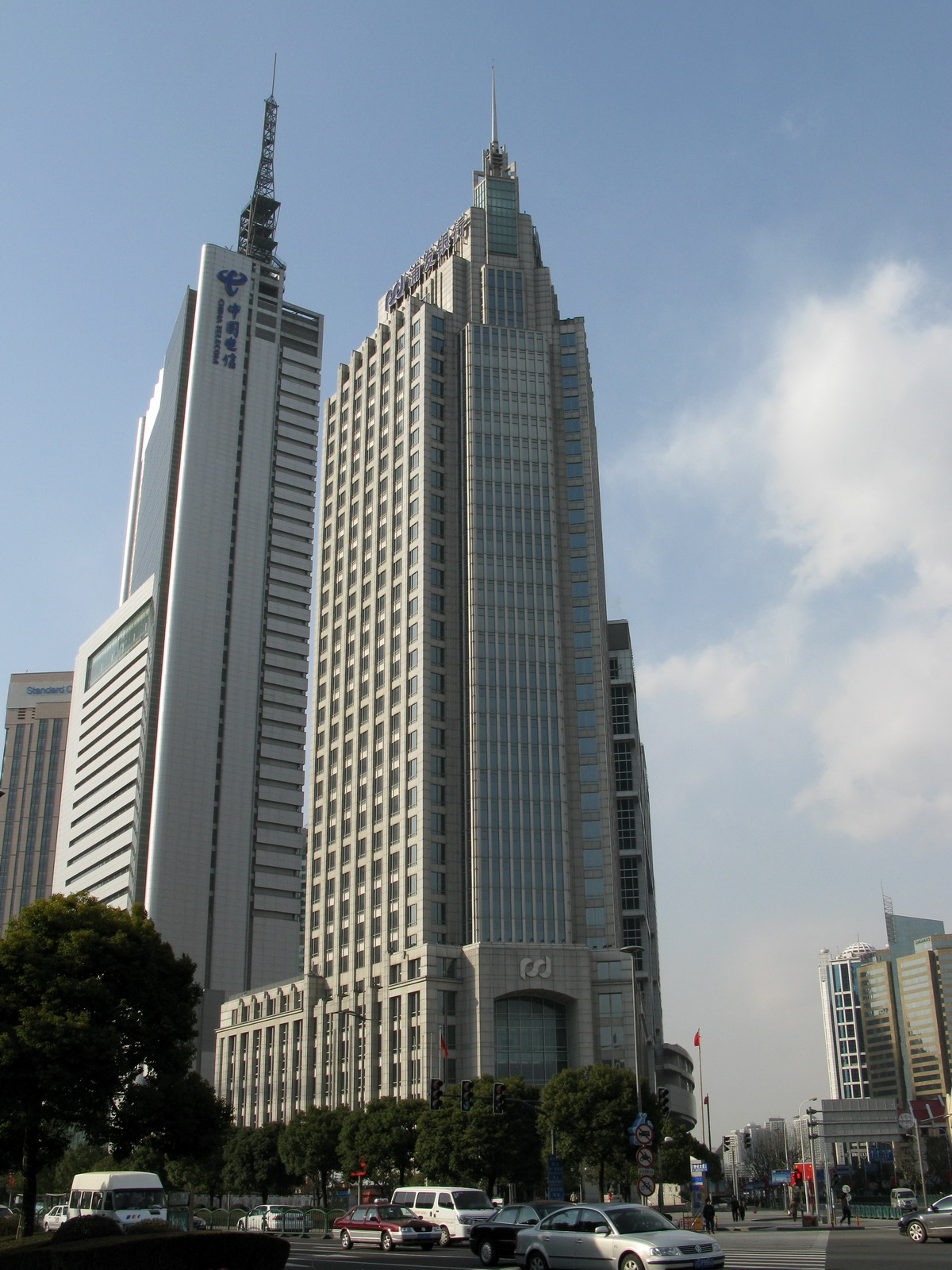
Pufa Tower, the Shanghai branch of SPDB, Pudong, Shanghai

Shanghai Pudong Development Bank partnered with Silicon Valley Bank in 2012 to create a separate Shanghai-based bank to lend to local technology startups. It was the first Sino-American joint venture bank. In 2024, SPD Silicon Valley Bank has been renamed into Shanghai Innovation Bank, 100% owned by SPD Bank.

In 2019, it was reported that the bank was under investigation for alleged money laundering and sanctions violations involving the North Korean regime. The bank allegedly moved money for the Foreign Trade Bank of the Democratic People's Republic of Korea that was used to finance the country's nuclear and ballistic missile programs.

== Criticism ==
=== Misappropriation in Chengdu ===
In April 2017, news broke that the Chengdu branch of Shanghai Pudong Development Bank (SPD Bank) was involved in a massive bad debt scandal amounting to hundreds of billions of yuan. This money was allegedly manipulated by four individuals through over 2,000 shell companies. Although SPD Bank initially denied any wrongdoing, it later admitted to irregularities at the branch. The Chengdu branch manager subsequently retired and was replaced by the manager of the Kunming branch.

=== Exploiting the image of deceased firefighters for advertising ===
An advertising campaign by SPD Bank sparked public outrage for exploiting the image of firefighters who died in the Liangshan forest fire to promote a credit card debt exemption service. Specifically, on the evening of 2 April 2019, SPD Bank's credit card center posted a poster stating "Exemption of outstanding credit card debts of martyrs in the Liangshan fire." This act was strongly condemned for being disrespectful to the sacrifice of the firefighters. By the afternoon of 3 April, SPD Bank had to publicly apologize and request the removal of the image.
