= Shengjing Bank =

Chinese banking company

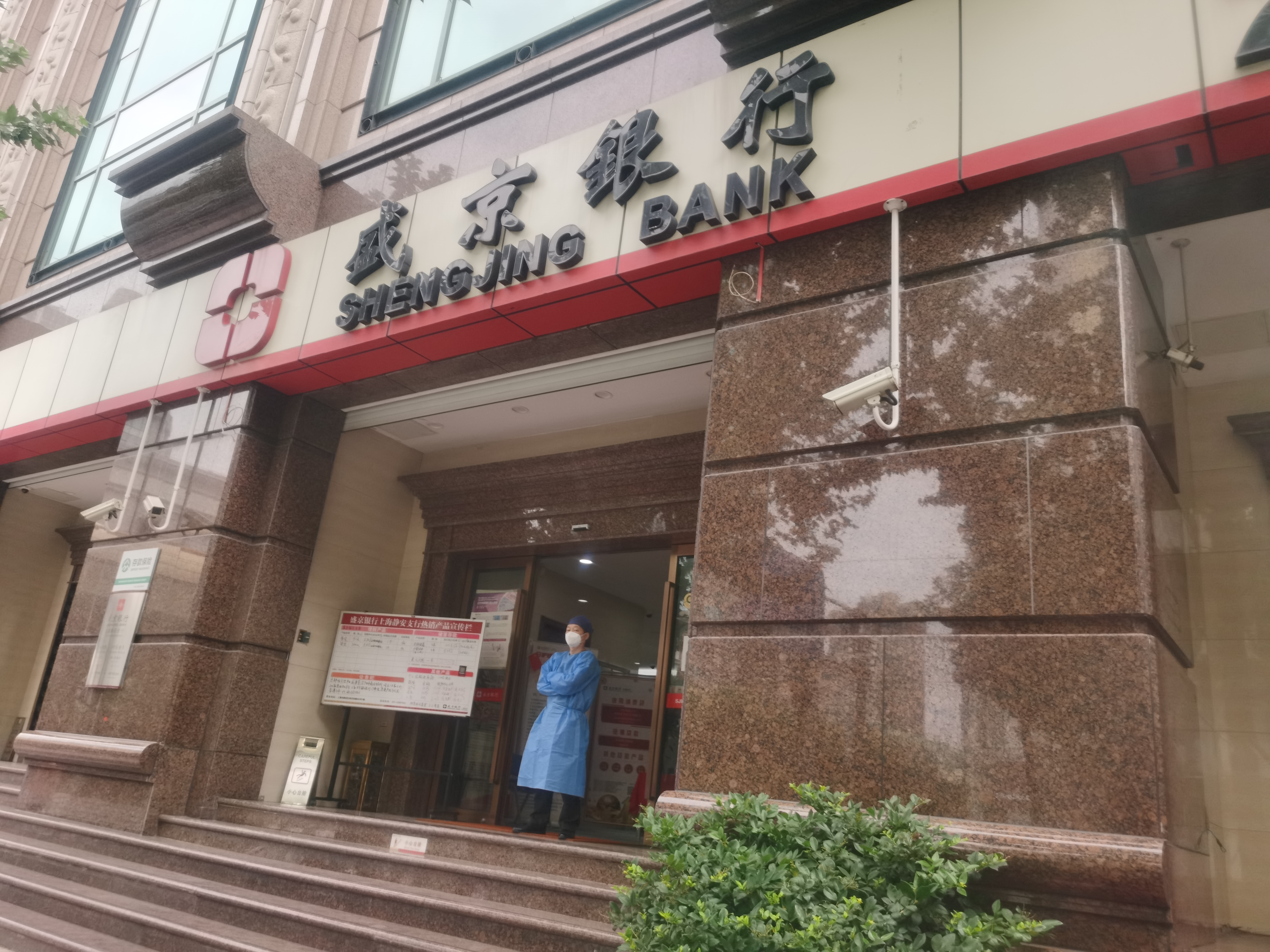
- Branch in Jing'an, Shanghai
- Native name: 盛京银行股份有限公司
- Type: Public
- Traded as: SEHK: 2066
- Founded: 18 October 1998
- Website: www.shengjingbank.com.cn

Shengjing Bank (in Chinese: 盛京银行) is a commercial bank, with its headquarters in Shenyang, Liaoning Province, China. It was established in 1996 as Shenyang City Commercial Bank and opened in Shenyang City only. It changed its name to Shengjing Bank in 2007 and has since opened branches in Beijing, Tianjin, Dalian, Yingkou, Huludao, Shanghai, Anshan, Changchun, Benxi, Panjin, Chaoyang, Fushun, Jinzhou, Fuxin, Dandong and Liaoyang.

As of fiscal year 2012/2013, Shengjing Bank's total assets were RMB355,432 million. Shenyang Hengxin owns approximately of 10.9% of equity interest in Shengjing Bank. Shenyang SASAC indirectly holds 100% interest in Shenyang Hengxin.

In 2014, Shengjing Bank wanted "to raise about $1.3 billion in a Hong Kong initial public offering". China Merchants Securities sponsored the initial public offering.

In 2015, Shengjing Bank announced it would issue "offshore RMB bonds".

In August 2025, Shengjing Bank received a proposal to be taken private by its largest shareholder, Shenyang Shengjing Financial Holding Investment, a state-backed entity majority owned by the Shenyang Municipal Government's Assets Supervision and Administration Commission. The initial offer valued the bank at HK$11.61 billion (approximately $1.49 billion), with a proposed price of HK$1.32 per Hong Kong–listed share, representing a premium to the last traded market price but a substantial discount to net asset value. The move highlighted growing reliance on government support among smaller Chinese banks amid prolonged weakness in the property sector.

In September 2025, Shenyang Shengjing Financial raised its privatisation bid to HK$1.60 per Hong Kong–listed share and increased its offer for the bank's domestic shares to 1.45 yuan. The bidder stated that the revised offer was final. Reports also linked Shengjing Bank's difficulties to its former association with the Evergrande Group, whose stake in the bank was gradually taken over by state-backed entities through auctions between 2021 and 2022. By the end of 2024, Shengjing Bank reported total assets of approximately 1.12 trillion yuan.

== See also ==
- Shenyang
- Banking in China
- Commercial banks in Northeast China

Dalian Bank, Shengjing Bank (Shenyang), Bank of Jilin (Changchun), Harbin Bank, etc.
