= Harbin Bank =

Chinese city-based commercial bank

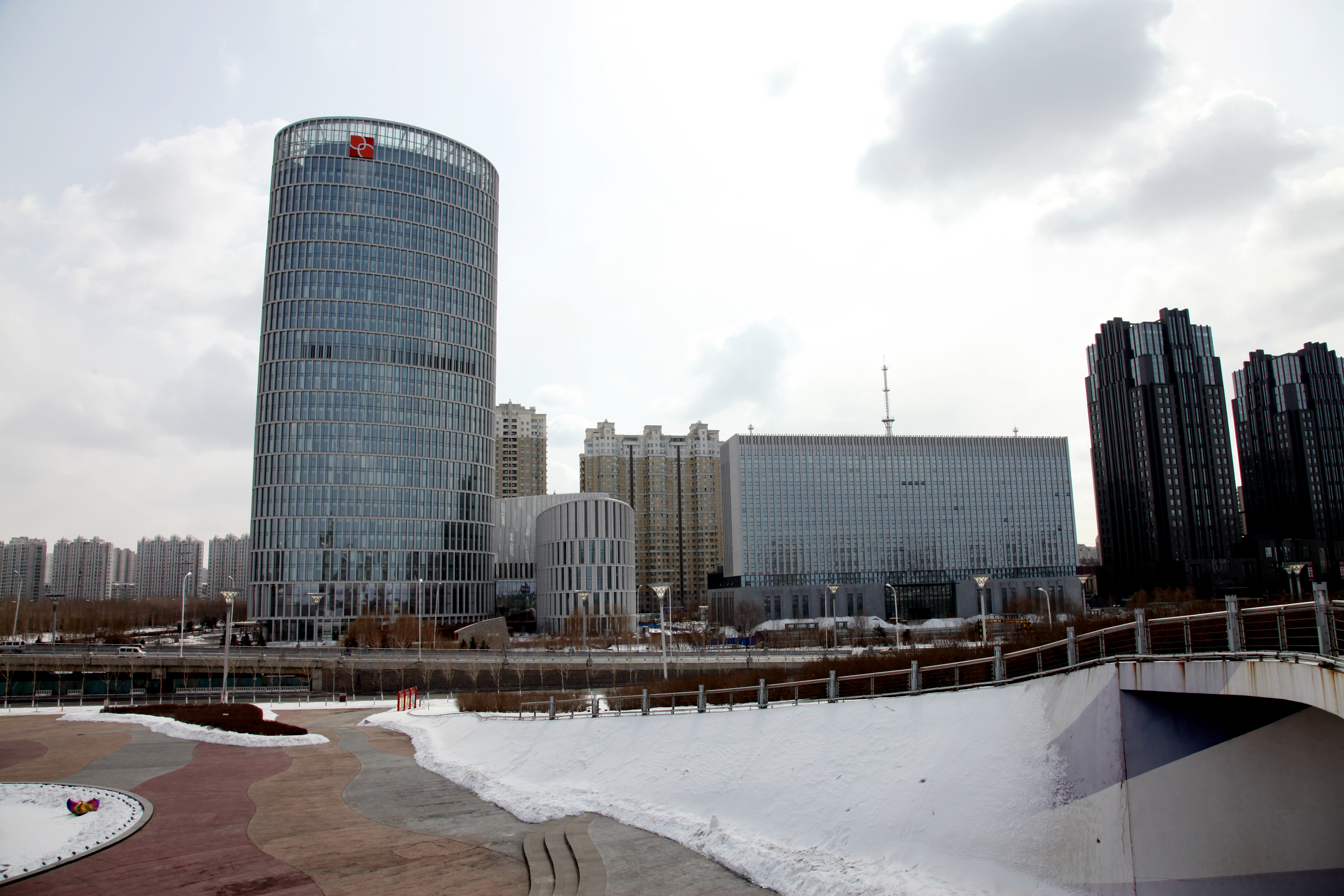
- Headquarters in Harbin
- Formerly: Harbin City Commercial Bank
- Type: public
- Traded as: unlisted (A share); SEHK: 6138 (H share)
- Industry: Financial services
- Founded: 1997
- Headquarters: Harbin, China
- Services: retail banking; corporate banking
- Website: www.hrbb.com.cn

Harbin Bank
- Simplified Chinese: 哈尔滨银行
- Traditional Chinese: 哈爾濱銀行
Transcriptions
Standard Mandarin
- Hanyu Pinyin: Hā' ěr bīn yín háng
Yue: Cantonese
- Jyutping: haa1 ji5 ban1 ngan4 hang4

Harbin City Commercial Bank
- Simplified Chinese: 哈尔滨市商业银行
- Traditional Chinese: 哈爾濱市商業銀行
Transcriptions

Harbin Bank Co., Ltd. is a Chinese city-based commercial bank (Chinese: 城市商业银行), with its headquarters in Harbin, Heilongjiang Province. It was established in 1997 as Harbin City Commercial Bank, opened its branches in Harbin City only, but changed its name to Harbin Bank in 2007 and has since opened branches in Dalian, Tianjin, Shuangyashan and Jixi. It ranks 4th by Comprehensive competitiveness among Chinese city commercial banks in 2011.

== History ==
The bank was formerly named "HRBank", a portmanteau of "Harbin" (name of the city) and "Bank". But due to its ambiguity, the name has been changed to the current one.

old logo

== See also ==
- Harbin
- Banking in China
- Commercial banks in Northeast China

Dalian Bank, Shengjing Bank (Shenyang), Bank of Jilin (Changchun)
