= Tian Xueren =

Chinese politician

- 田学仁

President of Jilin Bank
- In office January 2008 – June 2012
- Concurrent post: Communist Party Secretary

Executive Vice Governor of Jilin
- In office May 2007 – January 2008
- Governor: Han Changfu

Communist Party Secretary of Yanbian Korean Autonomous Prefecture
- In office January 2001 – December 2004
- Preceded by: Wang Rulin
- Succeeded by: Deng Kai

Communist Party Secretary of Jilin City
- In office February 1998 – January 2001
- Preceded by: Zhao Jiazhi
- Succeeded by: Wang Zhaohuan

Personal details
- Born: October 1947 (age 78–79) Kuandian Manchu Autonomous County, Liaoning, China
- Party: Chinese Communist Party (1971–2012; expelled)
- Education: Northeast Normal University; Graduate School of Chinese Academy of Social Sciences

Chinese name
- Traditional Chinese: 田學仁
- Simplified Chinese: 田学仁
Transcriptions
Standard Mandarin
- Hanyu Pinyin: Tián Xuérén

Tian Xueren (born October 1947) is a former Chinese politician who spent most of his career in Northeast China's Jilin province. He was investigated by the Chinese Communist Party's anti-graft agency in July 2012. He served as Communist Party Secretary and President of Jilin Bank from 2007 to 2012, and Executive Vice Governor of Jilin between 2004 and 2008.

== Life and career ==
Tian was born and raised in Kuandian Manchu Autonomous County, Liaoning. He graduated from Northeast Normal University and Graduate School of Chinese Academy of Social Sciences.

He began his political career in October 1958, and joined the Chinese Communist Party in October 1971.

He served as Deputy Head of Jilin Provincial Civil Affairs in 1985, and six years later promoted to the head position. In March 1994 he was promoted to become Deputy Communist Party Secretary of Changchun, capital of Jilin province, a position he held until 1997. Then he became the Deputy Communist Party Secretary of Jilin city, rising to Communist Party Secretary the next year. In January 2001 he served as Communist Party Secretary of Yanbian Korean Autonomous Prefecture, at the same time as holding the post of a Standing Committee of CCP Jilin Provincial Committee. In May 2007, he was appointed Executive Vice Governor of Jilin, he remained in that position until January 2008, when he was appointed Communist Party Secretary and President of Jilin Bank.

== Downfall ==
On November 5, 2011, he was suspected of "serious violations of discipline", said one-sentence statement issued by the ruling Communist Party's corruption watchdog body, the Central Commission for Discipline Inspection (CCDI).

In July 2012, he was expelled from the Chinese Communist Party and removed from office. On July 6, 2012, he was arrested by the Beijing Municipal Public Security Bureau. On November 1, 2013, he was sentenced to life imprisonment for taking over 19.19 million yuan in bribes, and all his personal property was confiscated. In July 2018, his sentence was commuted from life to 22 years.

Party political offices
Preceded by Zhao Jiazhi	Communist Party Secretary of Jilin City; 1998–2001	Succeeded by Wang Zhaohuan
Preceded by Wang Rulin	Communist Party Secretary of Yanbian Korean Autonomous Prefecture; 2001–2004	Succeeded by Deng Kai
