= Kuandian Manchu Autonomous County =

Kuandian 宽甸县 ᡴᡠᠸᠠᠨᡩᡳᠶᠠᠨ ᠰᡳᠶᠠᠨ
- Autonomous county
- 宽甸满族自治县 ᡴᡠᠸᠠᠨᡩᡳᠶᠠᠨ ᠮᠠᠨᠵᡠ ᠪᡝᠶᡝ ᡩᠠᠰᠠᠩᡤᠠ ᠰᡳᠶᠠᠨ; Kuandian Manchu Autonomous County
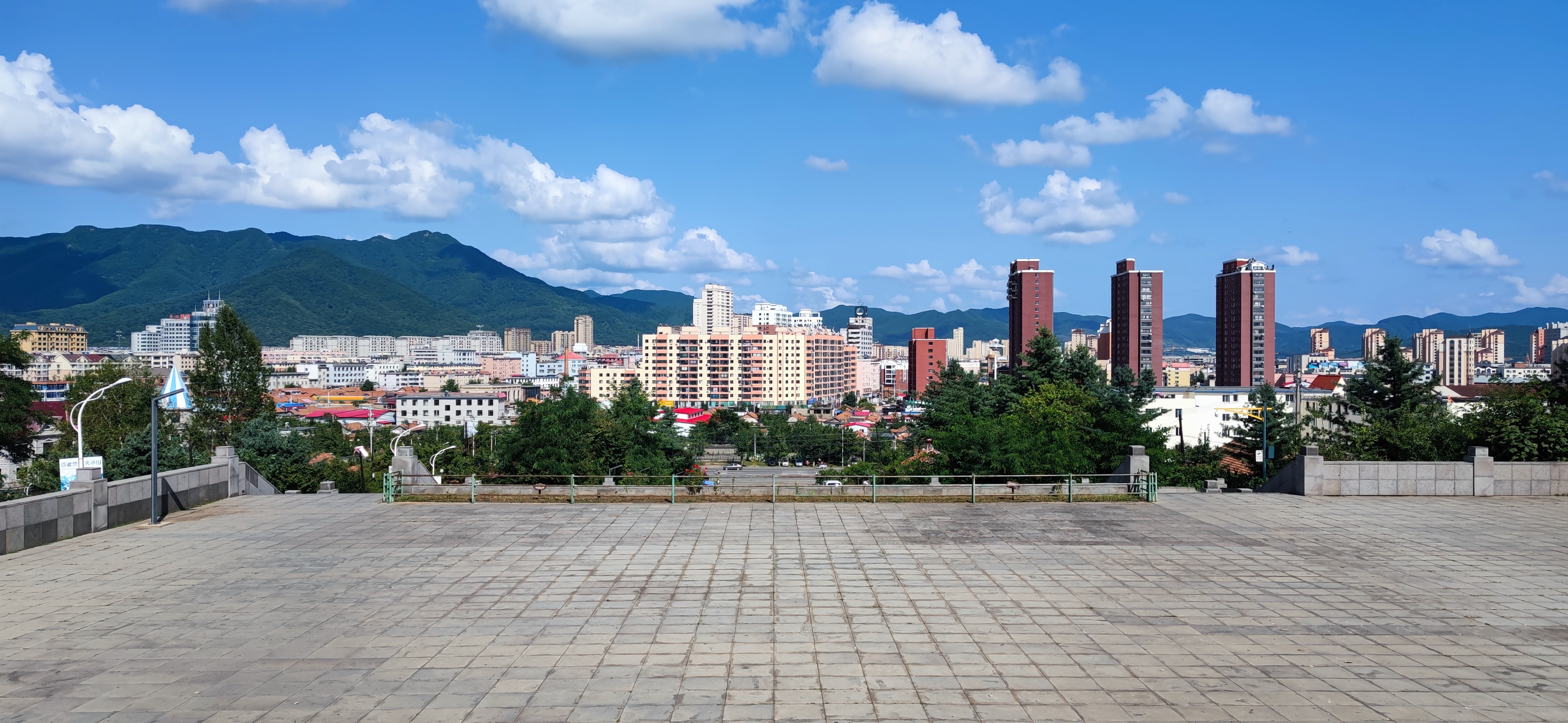

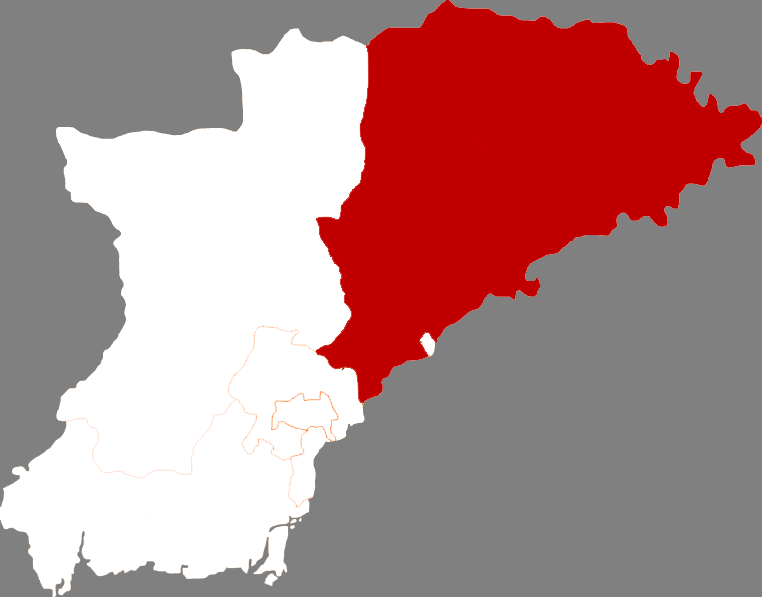
- Location in Dandong City

- Location of the county seat in Liaoning
- Coordinates: 40°44′N 124°47′E
- Country: China
- Province: Liaoning
- Prefecture-level city: Dandong
- County seat: Kuandian Town

Area
  - Total: 6,193.7 km^{2} (2,391.4 sq mi)
- Elevation: 284 m (932 ft)

Population (2020 census)
  - Total: 334,636
  - Density: 54.028/km^{2} (139.93/sq mi)
- Time zone: UTC+8 (China Standard)
- Postal code: 118200
- Website: www.lnkd.gov.cn

Kuandian Manchu Autonomous County (simplified Chinese: 宽甸满族自治县; traditional Chinese: 寬甸滿族自治縣; pinyin: Kuāndiàn Mǎnzú Zìzhìxiàn; Manchu: ᡴᡠᠸᠠᠨᡩᡳᠶᠠᠨ ᠮᠠᠨᠵᡠ ᠪᡝᠶᡝ ᡩᠠᠰᠠᠩᡤᠠ ᠰᡳᠶᠠᠨ; Möllendorff: kuwandiyan manju beye dasangga siyan) is a county of eastern Liaoning province, China, bordering North Korea to the southeast and Jilin in the northeast. It is under the administration of Dandong City, the centre of which lies 75 kilometres (47 mi) to the southwest, and is served by China National Highway 201. In Kuandian is the Hushan Great Wall, the most easterly section of the Great Wall of China. A short reconstruction of the wall is open to tourists. The area has an abandoned airstrip that was used by the Chinese airforce during the Korean War.

As of 2009, the county's population was 434,900 people.

== History ==
The area of present-day Kuandian belonged to the Yan state during the Warring States period, and was then brought under the Liaodong Commandery in the Qin Dynasty.

From the Eastern Han Dynasty until 408 CE, the southern part of the county was incorporated under the rule of various Chinese dynasties. The area became part of Goguryeo in 408 CE, and afterwards became part of the Tang Dynasty's Protectorate General to Pacify the East.

The county's name originates from the Kingdom of Balhae, when the area was known as Kuandianzi (Chinese: 寬甸子).

The area would come under the reign of the Liao dynasty, then the Jin dynasty, and then the Yuan dynasty.

In 1467, the Ming Dynasty built a defensive wall in the eastern part of the region that terminated at the Yalu River. Various forts were added in 1546 and 1573.

Kuandian County was established in 1876 under Fenghuang Subprefecture (Chinese: 鳳凰廳). The area belonged to Fengtian Province (奉天省) during the early days of the Republic of China.

The county was put under the jurisdiction of the prefecture-level city of Dandong in 1965. Kuandian County was approved as an autonomous county in September 1989, becoming the Kuandian Manchu Autonomous County.

== Administrative divisions ==
There are 19 towns, 2 townships and 1 ethnic township in the county. The county's seat of government is located in the town of Kuandian.

Name	Simplified Chinese	Hanyu Pinyin	Manchu	Möllendorff	Korean
Towns
Kuandian Town	宽甸镇	Kuāndiàn Zhèn	ᡴᡠᠸᠠᠨᡩᡳᠶᠠᠨ ᡴᠠᡩᠠᠯᠠᠩᡤᠠ	kuwandiyan kadalangga	관전진
Guanshui Town	灌水镇	Guànshuǐ Zhèn	ᡤᡠᠸᠠᠨ ᡧᡠᡳ ᡴᠠᡩᠠᠯᠠᠩᡤᠠ	guwan šui kadalangga	관수진
Penghai Town	硼海镇	Pénghǎi Zhèn	ᡦᡝᠩ ᡥᠠᡳ ᡴᠠᡩᠠᠯᠠᠩᡤᠠ	peng hai kadalangga	붕해진
Hongshi Town	红石镇	Hóngshí Zhèn	ᡥᠣᠩ ᠰᡥᡳ ᡴᠠᡩᠠᠯᠠᠩᡤᠠ	hong shi kadalangga	홍스진
Maodianzi Town	毛甸子镇	Máodiànzǐ Zhèn	ᠮᠠᠣ ᡩᡳᠠᠨᡯᡳ ᡴᠠᡩᠠᠯᠠᠩᡤᠠ	mao diandzi kadalangga	모전자진
Changdian Town	长甸镇	Zhǎngdiàn Zhèn	ᠴᠠᠩ ᡩᡳᠠᠨ ᡴᠠᡩᠠᠯᠠᠩᡤᠠ	cang dian kadalangga	장전진
Yongdian Town	永甸镇	Yǒngdiàn Zhèn	ᠶᠣᠩ ᡩᡳᠠᠨ ᡴᠠᡩᠠᠯᠠᠩᡤᠠ	yong dian kadalangga	영전진
Taipingshao Town	太平哨镇	Yǒngdiàn Zhèn	ᡨᠠᡳ ᡦᡳᠩ ᡧᠣ ᡴᠠᡩᠠᠯᠠᠩᡤᠠ	tai ping šo kadalangga	태평초진
Qingshangou Town	青山沟镇	Qīngshāngōu Zhèn	ᠴᡳᠩ ᠰᠠᠨ ᡤᠣᡠ ᡴᠠᡩᠠᠯᠠᠩᡤᠠ	cing san gou kadalangga	청산구진
Niumaowu Town	牛毛坞镇	Niúmáowù Zhèn	ᠨᡳᡠᠮᠠᡠᠸᡠ ᡴᠠᡩᠠᠯᠠᠩᡤᠠ	niumauwu kadalangga	우모坞진
Dachuantou Town	大川头镇	Dàchuāntóu Zhèn	ᡩᠠ ᠴᡠᠠᠨ ᡨᠣᡠ ᡴᠠᡩᠠᠯᠠᠩᡤᠠ	da cuan tou kadalangga	대천두진
Qingyishan Town	青椅山镇	Qīngyǐshān Zhèn	ᠴᡳᠩ ᡳ ᡧᠠᠨ ᡴᠠᡩᠠᠯᠠᠩᡤᠠ	cing i šan kadalangga	청의산진
Yangmuchuan Town	杨木川镇	Yángmùchuān Zhèn	ᠶᠠᠩ ᠮᡠ ᠴᡠᠠᠨ ᡴᠠᡩᠠᠯᠠᠩᡤᠠ	yang mu cuan kadalangga	양목천진
Hushan Town	虎山镇	Hǔshān Zhèn	ᡥᡠ ᡧᠠᠨ ᡴᠠᡩᠠᠯᠠᠩᡤᠠ	hu šan kadalangga	호산진
Zhenjiang Town	振江镇	Zhènjiāng Zhèn	ᠵᡝᠨ ᠵᡳᠠᠩ ᡴᠠᡩᠠᠯᠠᠩᡤᠠ	jen jiang kadalangga	진강진
Budayuan Town	步达远镇	Bùdáyuǎn Zhèn	ᠪᡠ ᡩᠠ ᠶᡠᠠᠨ ᡴᠠᡩᠠᠯᠠᠩᡤᠠ	bu da yuan kadalangga	보달원진
Daxicha Town	大西岔镇	Dàxīchà Zhèn	ᡩᠠ ᡧᡳ ᠴ᠋ᠠ ᡴᠠᡩᠠᠯᠠᠩᡤᠠ	da ši c'a kadalangga	대서차진
Bahechuan Town	八河川镇	Bāhéchuān Zhèn	ᠪᠠ ᡥᡝ ᠴᡠᠸᠠᠨ ᡴᠠᡩᠠᠯᠠᠩᡤᠠ	ba he cuwan kadalangga	팔하천진
Shuangshanzi Town	双山子镇	Shuāngshānzǐ Zhèn	ᡧᡠᠠᠩ ᡧᠠᠨ ᡯᡳ ᡴᠠᡩᠠᠯᠠᠩᡤᠠ	šuang šan dzi kadalangga	쌍산자진
Townships
Shihugou Township	石湖沟乡	Shíhúgōu Xiāng	ᠰᡥᡳ ᡥᡠ ᡤᠣᡠ ᡤᠠᡧᠠᠨ	shi hu gou gašan	석호구향
Gulouzi Township	古楼子乡	Gǔlóuzǐ Xiāng	ᡤᡠᠯᠣᡠᡯᡳ ᡤᠠᡧᠠᠨ	guloudzi gašan	고루자진
Ethnic Townships
Xialuhe Korean Ethnic Township	下露河朝鲜族乡	Xiàlùhé Cháoxiǎnzú Xiāng	ᠰᡳᠠ ᠯᡠ ᡥᡝ ᠴᠣᠣᡥᡳᠶᠠᠨ ᡠᡴᠰᡠᡵᠠᡳ ᡤᠠᡧᠠᠨ	sia lu he coohiyan uksurai gašan	하로하조선족향

== Geography ==
Kuandian occupies the eastern half of Dandong City and is situated among the Changbai Mountains, on the northwest (right) bank of middle-lower reaches of the Yalu River, across which it borders the North Korean provinces of North Pyongan and Chagang. Domestically, it borders Ji'an (Jilin) to the northeast, Fengcheng to the west, Benxi to the northwest, and Huanren County to the north. It has a total area of 6,193.7 km^{2} (2,391.4 sq mi) and 216.5 km (134.5 mi) of the Sino-Korean border.

=== Climate ===
Kuandian has a monsoon-influenced humid continental climate (Köppen Dwa) characterised by very warm, humid summers, due to the monsoon, and long, cold, and very dry winters, due to the Siberian anticyclone. The four seasons here are distinctive. A majority of the annual rainfall occurs in July and August. The monthly 24-hour average temperatures ranges from −11.3 °C (11.7 °F) in January to 22.6 °C (72.7 °F) in July, while the annual mean is 7.5 °C (45.5 °F). Due to the mountainous location, temperatures tend to be cooler, and summer rainfall is heavier. The average relative humidity is 71%, and the frost-free period is 140 days.

Climate data for Kuandian, elevation 260 m (850 ft), (1991–2020 normals, extremes 1981–present)
Month	Jan	Feb	Mar	Apr	May	Jun	Jul	Aug	Sep	Oct	Nov	Dec	Year
Record high °C (°F)	7.7 (45.9)	14.5 (58.1)	22.6 (72.7)	28.3 (82.9)	32.6 (90.7)	35.7 (96.3)	36.5 (97.7)	37.2 (99.0)	31.4 (88.5)	27.0 (80.6)	19.1 (66.4)	9.2 (48.6)	37.2 (99.0)
Mean daily maximum °C (°F)	−3.5 (25.7)	0.4 (32.7)	6.8 (44.2)	15.5 (59.9)	21.7 (71.1)	25.3 (77.5)	27.4 (81.3)	27.6 (81.7)	23.5 (74.3)	16.1 (61.0)	6.2 (43.2)	−1.9 (28.6)	13.8 (56.8)
Daily mean °C (°F)	−10.6 (12.9)	−6.2 (20.8)	0.8 (33.4)	8.8 (47.8)	15.3 (59.5)	19.9 (67.8)	23.0 (73.4)	22.6 (72.7)	16.9 (62.4)	9.1 (48.4)	0.5 (32.9)	−8.0 (17.6)	7.7 (45.8)
Mean daily minimum °C (°F)	−16.4 (2.5)	−12.0 (10.4)	−4.7 (23.5)	2.2 (36.0)	9.0 (48.2)	14.8 (58.6)	19.4 (66.9)	18.5 (65.3)	11.4 (52.5)	3.2 (37.8)	−4.3 (24.3)	−13.2 (8.2)	2.3 (36.2)
Record low °C (°F)	−34.0 (−29.2)	−30.2 (−22.4)	−20.8 (−5.4)	−7.6 (18.3)	−0.3 (31.5)	6.4 (43.5)	10.4 (50.7)	5.9 (42.6)	−1.2 (29.8)	−8.4 (16.9)	−22.3 (−8.1)	−27.7 (−17.9)	−34.0 (−29.2)
Average precipitation mm (inches)	9.4 (0.37)	18.2 (0.72)	23.8 (0.94)	50.5 (1.99)	84.2 (3.31)	128.6 (5.06)	275.4 (10.84)	273.1 (10.75)	84.8 (3.34)	60.4 (2.38)	40.7 (1.60)	15.7 (0.62)	1,064.8 (41.92)
Average precipitation days (≥ 0.1 mm)	4.3	5.2	6.3	8.1	10.5	13.3	16.3	14.0	7.7	8.0	7.3	6.0	107
Average snowy days	6.4	6.1	5.7	1.6	0	0	0	0	0	0.5	4.7	7.4	32.4
Average relative humidity (%)	67	64	60	58	65	75	84	83	77	71	70	69	70
Mean monthly sunshine hours	189.4	187.5	219.7	217.6	241.1	198.3	154.9	187.8	213.6	192.8	152.3	159.8	2,314.8
Percentage possible sunshine	63	62	59	54	54	44	34	45	58	57	52	56	53
Source 1: China Meteorological Administrationall-time extreme temperature
Source 2: Weather China

== Demographics ==
=== Ethnic groups ===
The county is majority Manchu as of 2002.

Ethnic Composition of Kuandian Manchu Autonomous County (2002)
Ethnic Group	Population	Percentage
Manchu	232,248	53.42%
Han	195,346	44.93%
Korean	4,925	1.13%
Mongols	1,562	0.35%
Hui	398	0.09%
Other	203	0.05%

=== Historic population ===
Historical population
Year	Pop.	±%
1907	176,018	—
1915	197,039	+11.9%
1932	324,680	+64.8%
1940	236,748	−27.1%
1949	302,714	+27.9%
1953	294,594	−2.7%
1964	348,814	+18.4%
1982	431,096	+23.6%
1985	436,001	+1.1%
1991	444,609	+2.0%
2005	437,651	−1.6%

Population censuses in the county have been undertaken since 1907. The county's population has declined since its peak of 444,609 people in 1991.

=== Urbanization ===
During the People's Republic of China, the county's urban population, and proportion of people living in urban environments has grown significantly. In 1949, the year the People's Republic of China was proclaimed, 1.8% of the county's population lived in urban areas. By 1953, this rose to 4.0%. In 1982, 9.2% of the county's population lived in urban areas, which rose to 15.3% by 1985, 23.8% by 1991, and 25.5% by 1995. At 2005, 23.7% of the county's population lived in rural areas.

== Economy ==
Kuandian's mineral deposits include boron, iron, lead, zinc, coal, copper, magnesite, and talc. The county's boron output accounts for about 50% of China's total, and the area is sometimes called "boron sea" (Chinese: 硼海; pinyin: péng hǎi).

== Transport ==
National Highway 201 and the Tieling–Changdian Highway (Chinese: 铁长线) passes through the county. The county is also served by Fenghuangcheng–Shanghekou Railway (凤上铁路).

== Notable people ==
- Yu Zhenwu (born 1931) - pilot
- Tian Xueren (born 1947) - politician
- Zhang Jiehui (born 1957) - politician
- Zhang Shaochun (born 1958) - politician
- Zhu Yuchen (born 1961) - business executive
- Wang Qiang (1975-2005) - serial killer
- He Xiangyu (born 1986) - contemporary artist
- Jin Jingzhe (born 1963) - physician, politician
