= Xu Jianyi =

Chinese politician and entrepreneur

- 徐建一

Chairman of FAW Group
- In office December 2010 – 15 March 2015
- Preceded by: Zhu Yanfeng
- Succeeded by: Xu Ping

President of FAW Group
- In office December 2007 – December 2010
- Preceded by: Zhu Yanfeng
- Succeeded by: Xu Xianping

Communist Party Secretary of Jilin City
- In office September 2006 – December 2007
- Preceded by: Jiao Zhengzhong
- Succeeded by: Zhou Huachen

Mayor of Jilin City
- In office September 2006 – December 2007
- Preceded by: Jiao Zhengzhong
- Succeeded by: Zhang Xiaopei

Personal details
- Born: December 1953 (age 72) Fushan District, Yantai, Shandong, China
- Party: Chinese Communist Party (expelled)
- Education: Jilin University
- Occupation: Politician, entrepreneur

Xu Jianyi (Chinese: 徐建一; pinyin: Xú Jiànyī; born December 1953 in Fushan District, Yantai, Shandong) is a former Chinese politician and entrepreneur. He was the Chairman of FAW Group, the delegate of the 17th and 18th National Congress of the Chinese Communist Party, the member of the 11th and 12th National People's Congress. On March 15, 2015, Xu Jianyi was placed under investigation by the Communist Party's anti-corruption agency. In 2017, Xu was sentenced to 11 years in prison for bribery.

== Career ==
Xu Jianyi was born in Fushan District, Yantai, Shandong, traces his ancestry to Nanjing. He went to work in April 1970 and joined Chinese Communist Party in June 1986. In 1975 Xu went to FAW Group. In 1990–1994, Xu Jianyi went to Changchun Automobile Research Institute (长春汽车研究所). In December 2004, Xu became the mayor of Jilin City, and he became the Communist Party Secretary of Jilin City in September 2006. In December 2007, he became the President of FAW Group, a Chinese state-owned automotive manufacturing company. Xu Jianyi became the Chairman of FAW Group in December 2010.

== Downfall ==
On March 15, 2015, Xu Jianyi was placed under investigation by the Central Commission for Discipline Inspection, the party's internal disciplinary body, for "serious violations of laws and regulations". Before the investigation, FAW Group officers are investigated by the local commission for Discipline Inspection of the Chinese Communist Party.

On August 13, 2015, the CCDI announced his expulsion from the Chinese Communist Party. In the announcement, the anti-graft body cited a litany of abuses, including "not carrying out decisions made by the [party] organisation," working to seek promotion for his son, accepting cash gifts, purchased real estate which "contravened the interests of the state", illegally procured bonuses, took bribes to seek gain for others in the promotion of subordinates and operations of businesses, and obstructed and interfered with the investigation into his wrongdoing. He was indicted on bribery charges, though the announcements did not say that his bribes were "massive" in scale, unlike most other announcements of this type.

On February 9, 2017, Xu was sentenced on 11 years and 6 months in prison for taking bribes worth 12.18 million yuan (~$1.77 million) by the First Intermediate People's Court in Beijing.

Government offices
Preceded by Jiao Zhengzhong	Mayor of Jilin City; 2006–2007	Succeeded by Zhang Xiaopei
Party political offices
Preceded by Jiao Zhengzhong	Communist Party Secretary of Jilin City; 2006–2007	Succeeded by Zhou Huachen
Business positions
Preceded by Zhu Yanfeng	President of FAW Group; 2007–2010	Succeeded by Xu Xianping
Preceded by Zhu Yanfeng	Chairman of FAW Group; 2010–2015	Succeeded by Xu PingXu Ping
