= Zhou Huachen =

Chinese politician

- 周化辰

Vice Chairman of the Standing Committee of Jilin People's Congress
- In office February 2011 – January 2016
- Chairman: Sun Zhengcai; Wang Rulin; Bayanqolu

Communist Party Secretary of Jilin City
- In office January 2008 – April 2011
- Preceded by: Xu Jianyi
- Succeeded by: Zhang Xiaopei

Communist Party Secretary of Baishan
- In office July 2006 – January 2008
- Preceded by: Li Wei
- Succeeded by: Yan Baotai

Mayor of Baishan
- In office January 2004 – July 2006
- Preceded by: Li Shuguo
- Succeeded by: Liu Xilan

Communist Party Secretary of Dunhua
- In office August 1997 – February 1999
- Preceded by: Luan Shengkuan
- Succeeded by: Liu Guifeng

Mayor of Dunhua
- In office December 1995 – August 1997
- Preceded by: Luan Shengkuan
- Succeeded by: Liu Guifeng

Personal details
- Born: June 1952 (age 73) Qian'an County, Hebei, China
- Party: Chinese Communist Party

Zhou Huachen (Chinese: 周化辰; pinyin: Zhōu Huàchén; born June 1952) is a former Chinese politician who spent most of his career in northeast China's Jilin province. He was investigated by China's top anti-graft agency in June 2018. Previously he served as vice chairman of the Standing Committee of Jilin People's Congress. He was a delegate to the 17th National Congress of the Chinese Communist Party.

== Biography ==
Zhou was born in Qian'an County, Hebei, in June 1952. During the Cultural Revolution, he was a sent-down youth in his home-county and then was transferred to Dunhua, a county-level city of the Yanbian Korean Autonomous Prefecture in Jilin. In February 1973, he became a teacher at Xinxiang Primary School (新乡小学) and later became a township leader in 1980. In January 1986, he was appointed deputy director of Dunhua Industrial Bureau, and became director of Dunhua Township Enterprise Bureau in August of that same year. He became assistant mayor of Dunhua in May 1987, and was made vice mayor in February 1990. He became mayor in December 1995, and then party secretary, the top political position in the city, beginning in August 1997. In February 1999, he was vice mayor of Yanbian Korean Autonomous Prefecture, and held that office until March 2001, when he was appointed deputy secretary-general of Jilin Provincial People's Government and deputy director of its General Office. He served as mayor of Baishan from January 2004 to July 2006, and party secretary, the top political position in the city, from July 2006 to January 2008. In January 2008, he was appointed party secretary of Jilin City, concurrently serving as vice chairman of the Standing Committee of Jilin People's Congress since February 2011.

=== Downfall ===
On 12 June 2018, he was put under investigation for alleged "serious violations of discipline and laws" by the Central Commission for Discipline Inspection (CCDI), the party's internal disciplinary body, and the National Supervisory Commission, the highest anti-corruption agency of China. His predecessor Xu Jianyi was sacked for graft in March 2015.

Government offices
Preceded by Luan Shengkuan	Mayor of Dunhua; 1995–1997	Succeeded by Liu Guifeng
Preceded by Li Shuguo	Mayor of Baishan; 2004–2006	Succeeded by Liu Xilan
Party political offices
Preceded by Luan Shengkuan	Communist Party Secretary of Dunhua; 1997–1999	Succeeded by Liu Guifeng
Preceded by Li Wei	Communist Party Secretary of Baishan; 2006–2008	Succeeded by Yan Baotai
Preceded by Xu Jianyi	Communist Party Secretary of Jilin City; 2008–2011	Succeeded by Zhang Xiaopei
