= Zhang Shaochun =

Chinese politician

- 张少春

Vice Minister of Finance
- In office November 2006 – March 2018

Personal details
- Born: February 1958 (age 68) Kuandian County, Liaoning, China
- Party: Chinese Communist Party (1978-2018, expelled)
- Education: Dongbei University of Finance and Economics

Chinese name
- Traditional Chinese: 張少春
- Simplified Chinese: 张少春
Transcriptions
Standard Mandarin
- Hanyu Pinyin: Zhāng Shàochūn

Zhang Shaochun (Chinese: 张少春; born February 1958) is a former Chinese politician who served as the Vice Minister of Finance. He was dismissed from his position in May 2018 for investigation by the Central Commission for Discipline Inspection and the National Supervisory Commission.

== Career ==
Zhang Shaochun was born in February 1958, and he was graduated from Dongbei University of Finance and Economics. In 1994, he entered to work at the Ministry of Finance, as the deputy director of the Office. He was appointed as the Director of the Law Division and the Education, Science, and Culture Division.

In 2003, Zhang was appointed as the Minister Assistant of the Ministry of Finance, until 2006. In 2006, he was appointed as the Vice Minister of Finance until 2018.

== Investigation ==
On May 7, 2018, Zhang Shaochun was placed under investigation by the Central Commission for Discipline Inspection, the Chinese Communist Party's internal disciplinary body, and the National Supervisory Commission, the highest anti-corruption agency of the People's Republic of China, for "serious violations of regulations and laws". He was expelled from the Chinese Communist Party on September 20. He was detained on October 18 and was indicted on suspicion of accepting bribes on November 22. On December 24, he pleaded guilty to bribery during his first trial at the Second Intermediate People's Court of Beijing. According to the indictment, he used his various positions between 1995 and 2018 to benefit others in business operations, position adjustments, and school enrollment for children and in return, he illegally accepted money and property worth more than 66.98 million yuan (about US$9.7 million), directly or through his relatives.

On May 13, 2019, Zhang was sentenced on 15 years in prison and fined 6 million yuan. Zhang was charged with accepting bribes worth 66.98 million yuan, by the Second Intermediate People's Court of Beijing.
