= Bank of Jilin =

Bank of Jilin Co., Ltd.

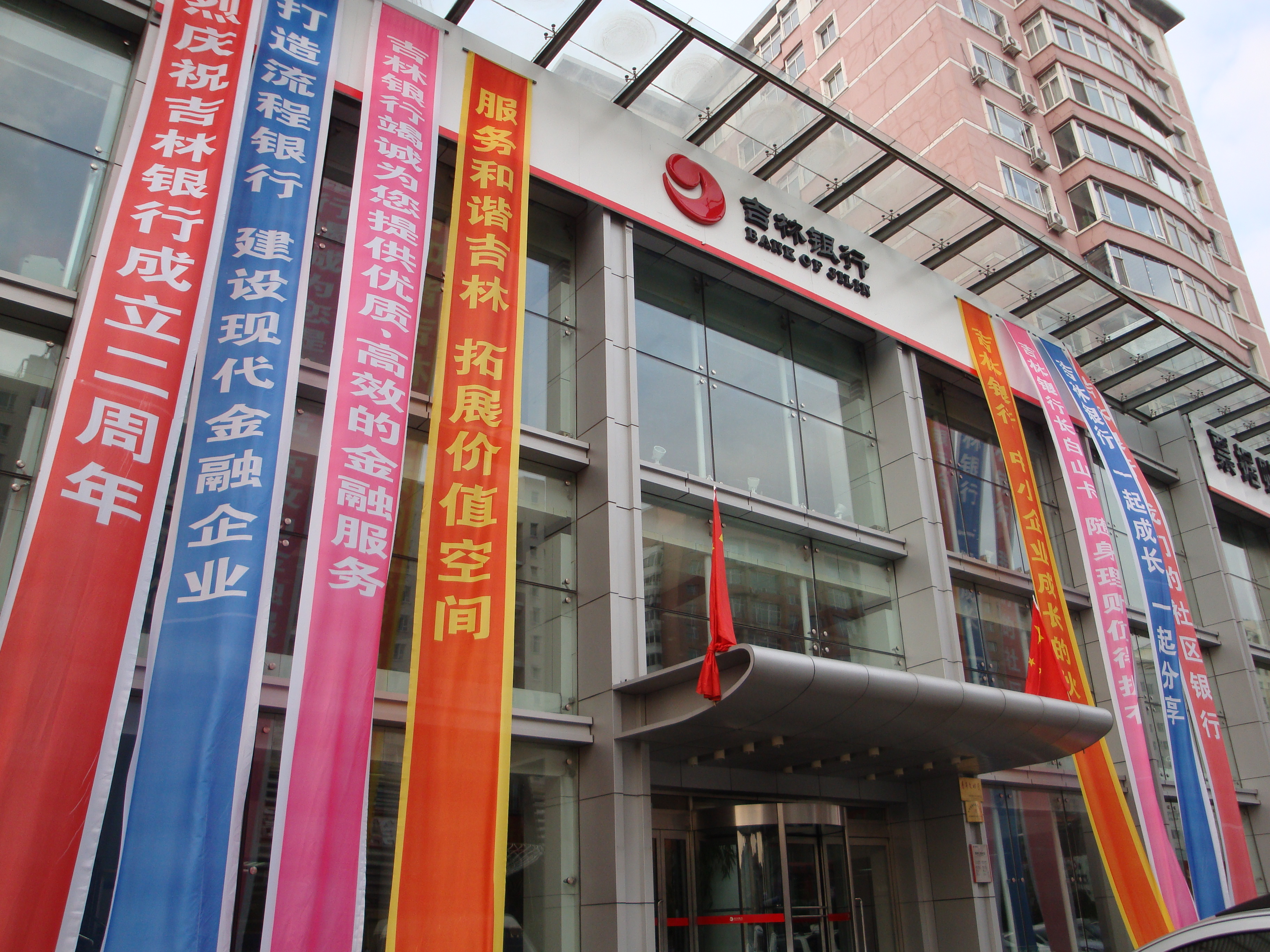
- Native name: 吉林銀行股份有限公司
- Type: Private
- Industry: Financial services
- Founded: September 18, 1998 (27 years ago)
- Headquarters: Jilin, China
- Website: www.jlbank.com.cn

Bank of Jilin (in Chinese: 吉林银行) is a commercial bank approved by China Banking Regulatory Commission, with its headquarters in Changchun, Jilin Province, China. As of the end of 2010, Bank of Jilin assets stood at 147.8 billion yuan (US$23.75 billion), up 87% since the establishment, deposits reached 117.4 billion yuan (US$18.86 billion), an increase by 61% compared to establishment; loan balance of 79 billion yuan (US$12.69 billion), an increase to 148% since establishment. Net profit of more than three years accounted for nearly 28 billion yuan (US$4.5 billion) and profitability of the firm has been among the highest in the province.

== History ==
Bank of Jilin was originally established as Changchun City Commercial Bank in 1997, and later changed its name to Bank of Jilin in October 2007 upon merger with Jilin and Liaoyuan City Commercial Banks. In 2008, it further absorbed Tonghua, Siping, Baishan and Songyuan Commercial Banks, and opened a new branch in Yanbian.

In December 2009, Dalian Branch was established marking the bank as an inter-regional Joint Stock Commercial Bank. Subsequently, Shenyang, Tianjin, Shanghai and Beijing branches were also established.

== Products and services ==
Bank of Jilin provides retail banking options for Deposits, Loans, Internet & mobile banking, micro-financing etc. Besides these, the other services provided include International trade financing, import/export bills, shipping guarantees, foreign currency exchange, remittance options like Western Union, SWIFT etc., treasury operations and inter-bank deposits.

The bank also provides entrusted loan services to government enterprises and large corporate entities (Non-banking financial company). Currently as per PBOC regulations, only authorized financial companies and banks are allowed to lend money. Using the entrusted loan services provided by the bank, these NBFC's can indirectly lend money to their customers.

== See also ==
- Changchun
- Jilin
- Banking in China
- Commercial banks in Northeast China

Dalian Bank, Shengjing Bank (Shenyang), Bank of Jilin, Harbin Bank, etc.
