= 88 BC =

88 BC in various calendars
- Gregorian calendar: 88 BC; LXXXVIII BC
- Ab urbe condita: 666
- Ancient Egypt era: XXXIII dynasty, 236
- Pharaoh: Ptolemy IX Lathyros, 1
- Ancient Greek Olympiad (summer): 173rd Olympiad (victor)¹
- Assyrian calendar: 4663
- Balinese saka calendar: N/A
- Bengali calendar: −681 – −680
- Berber calendar: 863
- Buddhist calendar: 457
- Burmese calendar: −725
- Byzantine calendar: 5421–5422
- Chinese calendar: 壬辰年 (Water Dragon); 2610 or 2403 — to — 癸巳年 (Water Snake); 2611 or 2404
- Coptic calendar: −371 – −370
- Discordian calendar: 1079
- Ethiopian calendar: −95 – −94
- Hebrew calendar: 3673–3674
- Hindu calendars
- Vikram Samvat: −31 – −30
- Shaka Samvat: N/A
- Kali Yuga: 3013–3014
- Holocene calendar: 9913
- Iranian calendar: 709 BP – 708 BP
- Islamic calendar: 731 BH – 730 BH
- Javanese calendar: N/A
- Julian calendar: N/A
- Korean calendar: 2246
- Minguo calendar: 1999 before ROC 民前1999年
- Nanakshahi calendar: −1555
- Seleucid era: 224/225 AG
- Thai solar calendar: 455–456
- Tibetan calendar: ཆུ་ཕོ་འབྲུག་ལོ་ (male Water-Dragon); 39 or −342 or −1114 — to — ཆུ་མོ་སྦྲུལ་ལོ་ (female Water-Snake); 40 or −341 or −1113

Year 88 BC was a year of the pre-Julian Roman calendar. At the time it was known as the Year of the Consulship of Sulla and Rufus (or, less frequently, year 666 Ab urbe condita) and the First Year of Houyuan. The denomination 88 BC for this year has been used since the early medieval period, when the Anno Domini calendar era became the prevalent method in Europe for naming years.

== Events ==
=== By place ===
==== Roman Republic ====
- The Social War ends with the defeat of the Italian allies by the Romans.
- August: The consul Lucius Cornelius Sulla becomes the first Roman commander to march on Rome with his army and to capture the city by force. This extraordinary act is prompted by his desire to maintain his proconsular command for the First Mithridatic War in Asia Minor. Sulla then murdered his enemy P. Sulpicius Rufus and forced Gaius Marius to flee to Africa.
- The Dardani, Scordisci, and the Maedi attack the Roman province of Macedonia.

==== Greece ====
- May – King Mithridates VI of Pontus invades Greece. Defeating the Roman forces four times in succession, he conquers Bithynia, Phrygia, Mysia, Lycia, Pamphylia, Ionia and Cappadocia. The Roman province of Asia is dismantled. On the king's orders, the local authorities in every city of the province round up and put to death all resident Italians in a single day (App.Mith.§§85–91). Plutarch (Sulla 24.4) says that 150,000 are killed, other sources calculate a figure of 80,000 people.

==== China ====
- Emperor Wu of Han makes preparations for the six-year-old Liu Fuling to be made Crown Prince and establishes Huo Guang as the future regent. The emperor executes Fuling's mother Lady Gouyi so that she cannot dominate the state while Fuling is a child emperor.

== Deaths ==
- Demetrius III Eucaerus, king of the Seleucid Empire
- Gnaeus Domitius Ahenobarbus, Roman consul
- Lady Gouyi, mother of Zhao of Han (b. 113)
- Manius Aquillius, Roman consul and general
- Ptolemy X Alexander I, king (pharaoh) of Egypt
- Publius Sulpicius Rufus, Roman tribune of the plebs, murdered by Sulla
- Quintus Mucius Scaevola Augur, Roman consul
- Quintus Poppaedius Silo, Italian tribe leader
