= Li Yannian (musician) =

Chinese musician during the Han dynasty

Li Yannian (Chinese: 李延年; pinyin: Lǐ Yánnián; died 90 BC) was a Chinese musician during the Han dynasty. He became a court musician during Emperor Wu's reign, but was eventually executed for treason.

His wrote the song Jiaren Qu (literally: The Beauty Song), describing a lady with exceptional beauty. Upon hearing this song, the Emperor did not believe there could be such a woman on earth, but his sister Princess Pingyang mentioned Li has a younger sister who could match the description, so Emperor Wu took Li's sister Li Furen as a concubine. Li Yannian himself allegedly was homosexual. When Emperor re-established the Imperial Music Bureau, Li Yannian was appointed a musician in the court. Li Yannian's brother Li Guangli also became a general in the Han armies.

== Jiarenqu ==
Jiarenqu (佳人曲, The Beauty Song) Book of the Later Han 67:34

北方有佳人, There is a beauty in the north,
絕世而獨立. who stands out among the generations.
一顧傾人城, One look will topple the men of the city.
再顧傾人國. A second look will topple the men of the country.
寧不知傾城與傾國. I would rather not know about toppled cities and toppled countries,
佳人難再得. because a beauty of this caliber may not come around again!

== Death, execution, and treason ==
After the death of his sister, Yannian's family began to lose Wu's favour. In 90 BC, much of the Li family was executed on multiple charges, including treason. According to one source, Li was executed in 90 BC during a struggle between the Li family and Empress Wei's family.
