= Luan Da =

Chinese 2nd-century BC religious figure

- Born: Yue, China
- Died: 112 BC
- Cause of death: Execution
- Spouse: Grand Princess Wei

Luan Da
- Traditional Chinese: 欒大
- Simplified Chinese: 栾大
Transcriptions
Standard Mandarin
- Hanyu Pinyin: Luán Dà
- Wade–Giles: Luan^{1} Ta^{4}
- IPA: [lwǎn tâ]

Luan Da (Chinese: 欒大; died 112 BC) was a Chinese occultist (fangshi) during the Western Han dynasty. He was said to come from Yue, an informal term for the southeastern commanderies of the Principality of Wu or Yang Province. He professed to know the secrets to immortality, transmutation, control over the Yellow River, and communication with the dead and the divine. Possessing the gift of gab and adept at confidence tricks, Luan Da gained the favour of Emperor Wu of Han. In the space of a few months, he rose from a commoner to great influence, holding titles and land, and marrying one of the emperor's daughters. However, he could not fulfill his promise to Emperor Wu, failing to produce a means to immortality. He gradually lost the emperor's favour and went on a purported visit to immortals; however, he was eventually captured and executed. At the apex of his career, many of his fellow mystics held him up as their role model and sought to emulate him. His death was a sign of the trade's fall from favour; laws were passed to restrict the practice of mediumship, even penalising those who married its practitioners.

== Background ==
=== Cultural background ===
In early imperial China (the Qin and Han dynasties), religion centered around the realms of shen (spirits) and yin (shadow). These realms were considered sacred, and religious figures attempted to contact their inhabitants through elaborate ceremonies in which the perceptions of the practitioner and audience were blurred through the use of smoke, incense, and music. Other practices were also employed to further manipulate the practitioner's senses. For example, a chief priest would fast and meditate before he performed a sacrifice. The deprivation of food was thought to make him more susceptible to perceive shen, yin, and other phenomena within the smoke during the ritual. During the Han dynasty, alleged mediums would fall into trances or perform ritual dances to accomplish supernatural feats. Some of these events were documented in the Zhou-era Classic of Poetry.

=== Emperor Wu of Han ===
Emperor Wu of Han was a superstitious man, and believed that he could attain good health and immortality through spiritual means. One such method involved collecting morning dew on a platter and mixing crushed jade with it to form a "spiritual dew". The emperor routinely drank this "spiritual dew" and only stopped after he fell severely ill from it.

The emperor employed several men who claimed to be able to produce elixirs of immortality or who could communicate with spiritual beings. Shaoweng, the court mystic who preceded Luan Da and had studied under the same teacher, performed a ritual that was exposed to be a fraud. Embarrassed that he had been tricked, the emperor ordered Shaoweng's execution and kept quiet about the affair. Shaoweng purportedly died from consuming horse liver, which was thought to be poisonous at the time. Later, Emperor Wu reconsidered Shaoweng's fraud, wondering if perhaps some of his mystical arts had been genuine. The emperor realized that his chance for immortality might have passed with Shaoweng's execution, and began to search for a new mystic.

== Career ==
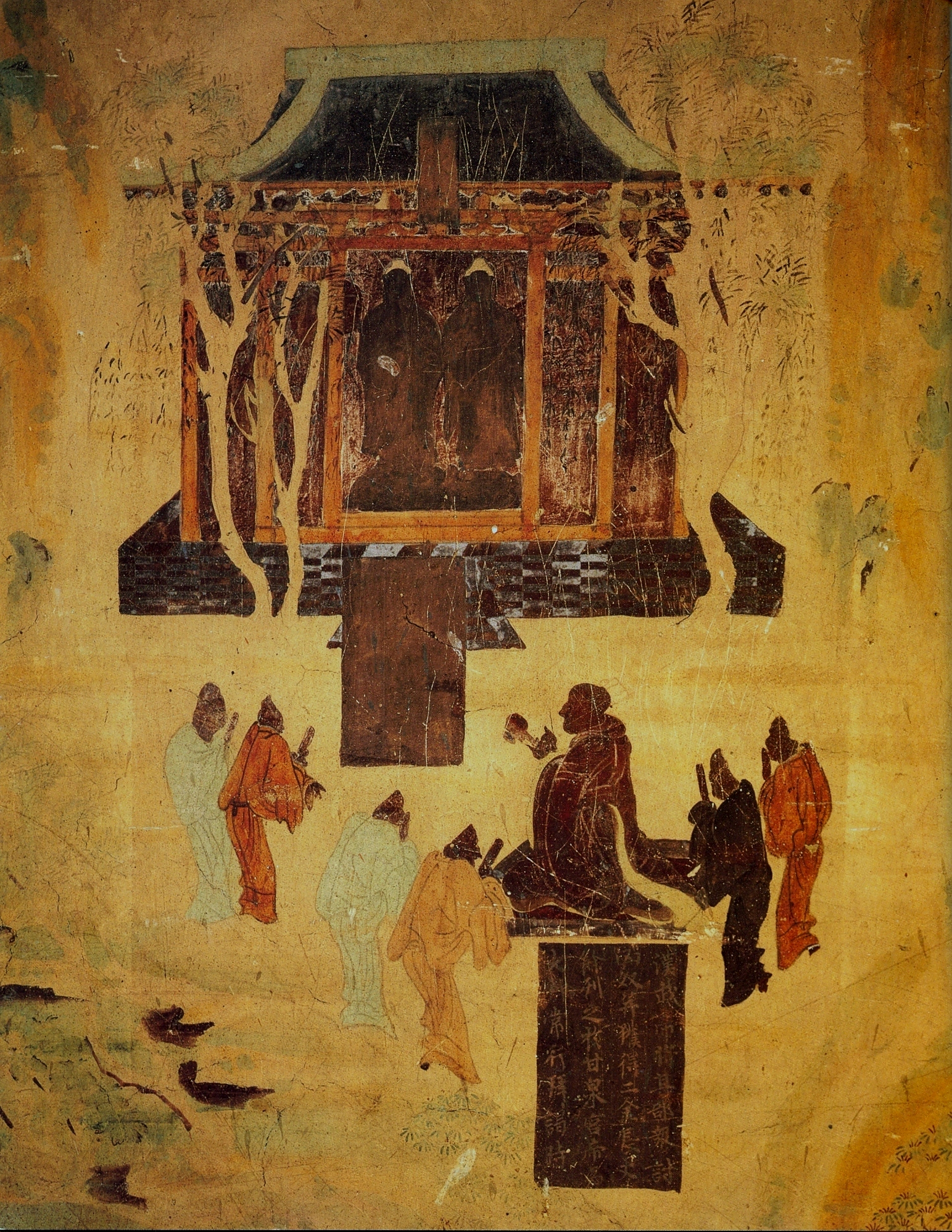
Emperor Wu of Han worshiping Buddha

=== Early life ===
Not much is known about Luan Da's early life, only that he was born in Yue and was the eldest child in his family. Records do not even reveal his full name; the Da (大; big) simply signified his seniority over his siblings. It was conventional at the time to omit surnames for minor figures in the annals of Chinese history, and thus this is not unusual.

=== Rise to power ===
The state of Yue was renowned for its mediums, and Luan Da was a fine example. The Shiji described him as "tall and a brilliant speaker", who was "fertile in techniques" and a master of esoteric arts, such as shadow play. He was originally a mystic in the court of the emperor's brother, Liu Ji, the Prince of Jiaodong. Liu Ji's wife had mentioned Luan Da to her brother, the Marquis of Lecheng. Trying to boost his standing with Emperor Wu, the Marquis told the emperor of Shaoweng's far more capable fellow disciple, Luan Da, in 113 BC.

Upon their meeting, Emperor Wu inquired into Luan Da and his teacher's powers. In response, Luan Da boasted that he had met immortals. He also claimed that with enough stature and skill at alchemy, one could create gold, manufacture a means to achieve immortality, dam the Yellow River (at the time flowing south of Shandong along the Si and Huai Rivers' courses after initial attempts to repair the damage of its 132 BC flood had failed), and become an immortal. Luan Da then expressed concern at how Shaoweng had been killed, but the excited emperor assured him that the rumours of Shaoweng's execution were false. The emperor, in his enthusiasm, offered Luan Da anything if he would take Shaoweng's place and discover the secret of immortality from his allegedly immortal master. To this, Luan Da replied:

"Your servant's masters seek nothing of men, it is men who seek of them. If Your Majesty is determined to invite them here, then ennoble your envoys, make them imperial relatives, treat them with courtesy due guests, and do not humble them. Let your envoys each hang their seals of office from their girdles, and then you can send them to converse with spiritual beings. Whether the spiritual beings will accede or not is still uncertain, but if you bestow high honors on your envoys, then they may be induced to come."

Remembering his experience with Shaoweng, the emperor turned cautious and tested Luan Da; he requested the mystic to display his power. Luan Da set down a Xiangqi board and, while chanting, caused the chess pieces to charge at one another. The emperor was reassured that Luan Da truly had power. The trick was achieved by coating the pieces in a mixture of rooster's blood, iron shavings, and "magnetic dust". In Science and Civilisation in China (1986), Joseph Needham discusses the details of this feat and proposed that lodestone was likely used: powdered magnetite would not have been very effective.

At that time, the Yellow River was flooding, causing widespread devastation to the people and the rice harvests. As Luan Da had claimed that he could dam the river, Emperor Wu felt that it would be wise to encourage the mystic to take up the task by quickly pleasing him. The emperor granted Luan Da the title of the General of Five Boons, and almost as an afterthought, three other such titles: the General of Heavenly Practitioners, the General of the Earth Practitioners, and General Grand Communicator. Emperor Wu also lavished gifts on him; he was granted the marquisate of Letong, giving him some 2,000 households to rule over, and the emperor also gave him a luxurious mansion, a thousand servants, opulent transportation, many decorations, a seal labelled "General of Heavenly Way", and even the hand in marriage of Grand Princess Wei, the emperor's eldest daughter, accompanied by a dowry estimated at 10,000 catties of gold. The emperor himself, along with envoys, members of the imperial family, and high-ranking officials often invited Luan Da to dine or paid him house calls merely to ask how he was doing. With his marquisate and five generalships, Luan Da had become a man of great standing only a few months after his introduction to the emperor. He was no longer merely Emperor Wu's subject, but an envoy of the immortal beings with status equal to the emperor.

In possession of these newly-bestowed honours, Luan Da spent every evening at home, attempting to summon spirits. According to the Shiji, no spirits appeared, but only "a multitude of ghosts who gathered around". These, the text claims, he was able to command. The Shiji's author, Sima Qian, was scornful of Luan Da, noting that "Everyone on the seacoast of Yan and Qi began waving their arms about, declaring that they possessed secret arts and could summon spirits and immortal ones." Indeed, Luan Da's dramatic growth in reputation and stature became a great topic of discussion in the Han capital of Chang'an, and mystics were eager to imitate his success.

=== Fall from power and death ===
By the summer after his elevation, Luan Da had forgotten the emperor's request for an audience with the immortals. Emperor Wu, anxious to achieve immortality, sent an envoy to remind his court mystic of his task. Luan Da attempted to delay, but eventually realised he had to appease the emperor and allay his suspicions. The mystic decided to put on an act of journeying to meet the immortals. With a group of followers, he travelled to Shandong. Emperor Wu, however, was already suspicious, and sent a spy to follow Luan Da.

The spy followed the court mystic to Mount Tai, where he performed a ritual with his followers, although no one saw any immortals. Luan Da ordered his followers to stay behind while he went ahead to meet the immortals, telling them that the spiritual beings would not descend to meet with lowly servants. The spy tailed Luan Da as he went forth alone, but only saw the mystic walk along the beach. Luan Da returned to his group and reported that he had seen his immortal master and that they were to report back to the emperor. Angered by Luan Da's deceit, the spy rushed back to the capital before the mystic to inform Emperor Wu. The emperor, incensed at Luan Da's confidence tricks, decided to play along when the mystic returned to see what lies he would tell.

When Luan Da returned, he told the emperor of his falsified meeting with the immortals; however, he sensed that the emperor did not believe him. Before long, the emperor broke out in a rage, ordering Luan Da to tell what he had actually done. Dumbfounded, Luan Da attempted to continue his lies; however, the emperor called for the spy to come forth and expose the lies. Lost for words, Luan Da was arrested on Emperor Wu's order, and executed by having his body chopped into two at the waist. The emperor extended his fury to the Marquis of Lecheng for introducing Luan Da, having him beheaded and his body then defiled.

Later in the Han dynasty, mystics like Luan gradually lost their influence as the rulers passed many laws against them. Mediums were not allowed to barter their crafts alongside roads, and some were even forbidden to make a living at such a craft at all. Those married to shamans were not even allowed to hold government office, though this law was often bypassed. Luan Da's fall signaled the beginning of the end for these mystics.

== See also ==
- Mysticism
- Religion in China
