= Lady Li =

Concubine of Emperor Wu of Han

Lady Li 李夫人
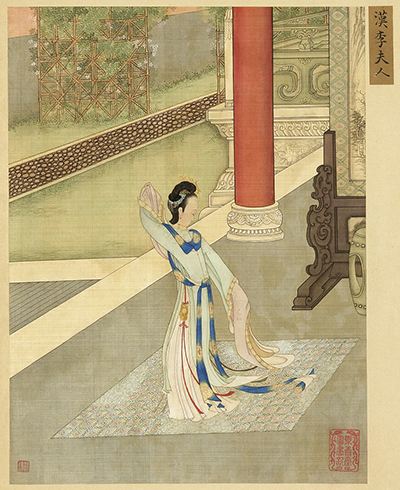
- A portrait of Lady Li in the album Gathering Gems of Beauty (畫麗珠萃秀)
- Born: Zhongshan
- Died: between 104 and 101 BC
- Burial: Yingling, near Maoling
- Spouse: Emperor Wu of Han
- Issue: Liu Bo, Prince Ai of Changyi
Posthumous name
- Empress Xiàowǔ 孝武皇后
- Clan: Li (李)
- Relatives: Li Yannian (brother); Li Guangli (brother); Liu He (grandson)

Lady Li (Note: The name Li Yan is not recorded in history) (Chinese: 李夫人; pinyin: Lǐ Fūrén, died between 104 and 101 BC) was a Han dynasty concubine of Emperor Wu. Civil unrest broke out between her family and Wei Zifu's family. Moreover, her brother Li Guangli defected to the Xiongnu and became a traitor to China. As a result, Emperor Wu ordered her relatives to be tried and executed, leading to the downfall of her and her family.

== Biography ==
=== As concubine ===
She was allegedly the inspiration for The Beauty Song, composed by her brother Li Yannian.

Lady Li was born in an entertainer family; she was a dancer. Her parents and brothers were also entertainers. Lady Li's brother Li Yannian was a musician for Princess Pingyang. After he performed The Beauty Song (Chinese: 佳人曲; pinyin: jiārén qǔ) for Emperor Wu, the Emperor asked Li Yannian if he knew of such a woman, to which Princess Pingyang responded that the song was about Li's sister. The Emperor thus requested to meet with Lady Li, and she became one of his concubines. She had one son named Bo (髆).

However, although composed in the persona of Han Wudi, there is doubt as to the actual authorship of this and similar poems.

=== Treason and execution of her family ===
In the civil unrest between the Li family and Empress Wei Zifu's family, several of Li's relatives were killed and executed. At the time Empress Wei Zifu was the head wife of Liu Che, and Wei and Li were jealous of each other.

Moreover, Li Guangli later surrendered to the Xiongnu circa 90-89 BC and was accused of being a traitor. Li's family was then tried and executed for treason.

With the suicide of Emperor Wu's crown prince Liu Ju in 91 BC, her son Liu Bo was among the candidates for the title of crown prince. However, the title ultimately went to young Liu Fuling, who succeeded Emperor Wu as Emperor Zhao of Han. In any case, Liu Bo predeceased his father. Her grandson, Liu Bo's son, Prince He of Changyi, was enthroned as emperor as Emperor Zhao's successor, but was removed from his position after 27 days by Huo Guang. Li's grandson was impeached on 1127 charges of misconduct committed, and afterwards, Li's grandson was not included on the official historical list of Han emperors.

=== Death ===
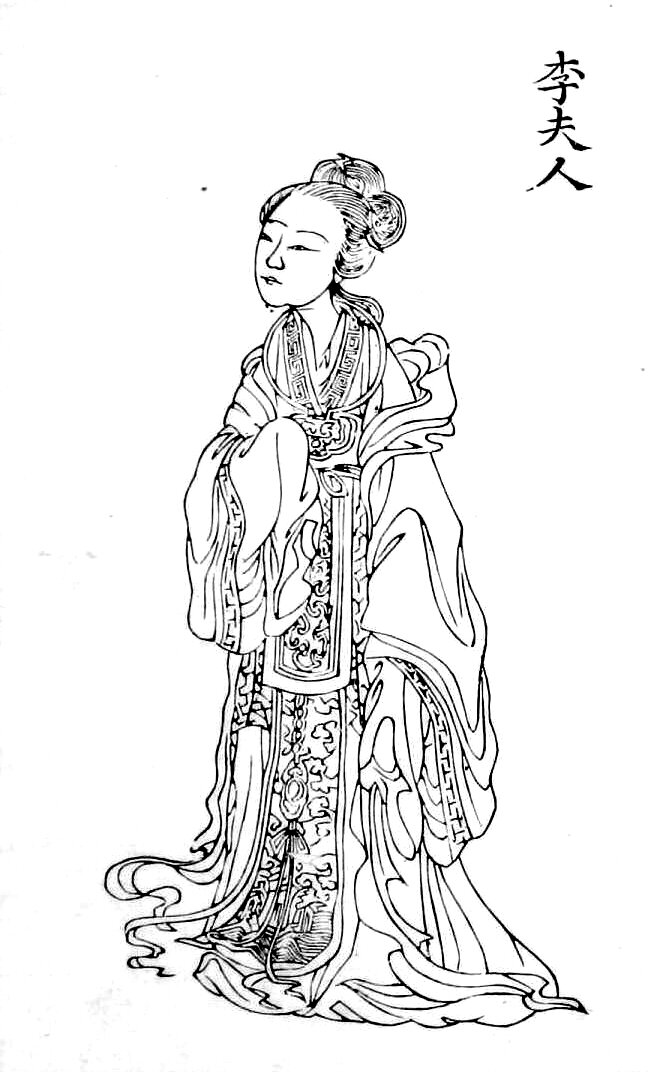
An illustration of Lady Li from the Qing dynasty book Baimei xinyong tuzhuan

At the end of her life, Lady Li became gravely ill. She refused to allow Emperor Wu to see her face, citing the loss of her beauty. Upon Wudi's urging, Li went further and refused to even speak. As such, Wudi left unhappily. The lady's sisters then admonished her for not allowing the emperor to see her face.

The date of Lady Li's death is unrecorded, but is calculated to be between 104 and 101 BC, as her brother Li Guangli was sent to attack Dayuan twice during this period, and it was recorded that Lady Li had died before Li Guangli returned from his second expedition. But soon later Li Guangli defected to the Xiongnu, and her family was executed for treason.

== Popular culture ==
- Portrayed by Zhan Jie in the 1990 TV series Han Wudi
- Portrayed by He Jiayi in the 2000 BMN TV series The Prince of Han Dynasty
- Portrayed by Gao Tingting in the 2005 CCTV TV series The Emperor in Han Dynasty
- Portrayed by Zhang Xuan in the 2014 Zhejiang Huace Film and Now TV collaborative TV series The Virtuous Queen of Han
- Portrayed by Fala Chen in the 2014 HT TV series Sound of the Desert

== See also ==
- Hanjian
