= Princess Eyi =

Chinese princess (died 80 BCE)

Princess Eyi 鄂邑公主
- Died: 80 BCE; Chang'an
- Burial: Lantian County, Shaanxi
- Son: Wen Xin (文信)
- Clan: House of Liu
- Father: Emperor Wu of Han
- Alternative names and titles: Mistress Gai (盖主); Grand Princess Gai (盖长公主); Grand Princess Eyigai (鄂邑盖长公主); Grand Princess Eyi (鄂邑长公主)

Princess Eyi (Before 94 BC - died 80 BCE) was a Chinese princess, the daughter of Emperor Wu of Han and sister of Emperor Zhao of Han.

== Life ==
Her precise date of birth and the identity of her mother remain undisclosed in historical records. She is prominently recognized for her political engagements and involvement in various conspiratorial activities.

When her younger brother, Emperor Zhao, ascended to the throne at the age of 8, she assumed control of the state seals and was conferred the title of Grand Princess. This honor, typically reserved for daughters born to an empress, was bestowed upon her along with 13,000 fiefs. She was assumed guardianship of the emperor and played a pivotal role within the royal family, overseeing the administration of the imperial palaces. Enjoying the emperor's profound respect akin to that accorded to his mother, she wielded unrestricted authority in appointing and dismissing officials within the inner palace, regardless of gender. Additionally, she controlled access to the palaces, managed the emperor's personal finances, including income and expenditures, and determined the composition and duties of the palace guards. Consequently, she wielded significant influence in the Han court politics, commanding widespread respect and influence that none dared to ignore or underestimate. Even the most powerful ministers of the government, such as Huo Guang and Shangguan Jie, held her in high regard and relied on her counsel. Shangguan Jie, in particular, sought her assistance in his political maneuvers and conspiratorial undertakings.

=== Role in the marriage of the Emperor ===
She played a crucial role in arranging the marriage between her brother, the emperor, and the Grand Empress Dowager Shangguan. Lady Shangguan's father Shangguan An was a friend of Emperor Zhao's sister, Princess Eyi, and her lover, Ding Wairen (丁外人). In 84 BC, Ding was encouraged by an advisor to persuade the princess regarding the benefits of their union. It was argued that the Shangguans' influence would strengthen through the marriage, potentially aiding Ding in legitimizing his relationship with Princess Eyi. Subsequently, Princess Eyi consented, leading to the appointment of the young Lady Shangguan as an imperial consort with the rank of jieyu. The following year, in 83 BC, she was elevated to the position of empress.

=== First conspiracy ===
During Emperor Zhao's reign, the Shangguan family sought to honor Ding for his role in facilitating the marriage between Empress Shangguan and the Emperor by proposing his elevation to the rank of marquess. However, their proposal was declined by Huo, who also rejected subsequent efforts to appoint Ding to significant governmental positions. These actions led Princess Eyi to harbor resentment towards Huo's authority. Together with the Shangguans, Prince Dan of Yan, and Vice Prime Minister Sang Hongyang (桑弘羊), who opposed the dismantling of his financial monopoly, they formed an anti-Huo faction. In 80 BC, Prince Dan submitted a report to Emperor Zhao, alleging improper exercise of imperial authority by Huo. The conspirators' scheme involved prompting Emperor Zhao to authorize an investigation, after which Shangguan Jie and Sang planned to apprehend and promptly execute Huo. However, upon receiving the report, Emperor Zhao, aged 14 at the time, chose not to take immediate action. The following day, he summoned Huo to the palace and absolved him of the accusations. Emperor Zhao reasoned that the alleged actions occurred recently and at a distance from Prince Dan, casting doubt on the report's veracity. This incident did not initially reveal the anti-Huo conspiracy, but it left an impression of the young emperor's discernment among his contemporaries.

=== Second conspiracy ===
Later in the same year, the conspirators made another attempt. Their plan involved Princess Eyi inviting Huo to a banquet with the intention of ambushing and assassinating him. Subsequently, they aimed to depose Emperor Zhao and install Prince Dan as the new emperor. Allegedly, the Shangguans planned to eliminate Prince Dan upon his arrival in the capital and declare Shangguan Jie as emperor. The conspiracy was exposed by a servant of Princess Eyi, leading to the arrest and execution of the conspirators and their entire families. Princess Eyi and Prince Dan chose to end their own lives.

== Archaeological finds ==
A section of the Juyan Bamboo Slips (Chinese: 居延漢簡; pinyin: Jūyán hànjiǎn) excavated in 1970 refers to a 'senior princess', which is widely believed to denote Princess Eyi. The slips describe that Princess Eyi committed suicide in 80 BCE and that her granddaughter later became Queen of Hejian (Chinese: 河間; pinyin: Héjiān).

In 2014, it was reported that the Shaanxi Archaeological Research Institute had excavated a large Han tomb in Huaxu Town (Chinese: 華胥鎮), Lantian County, which belonged to Princess Eyi. The burial had originally been suggested to belong to Jing Ke, who attempted to assassinate King Zheng of Qin in 227 BCE. However, wuzhu coins found in the tomb were cast in the yuanshou period (122–117 BCE) of Emperor Wu of Han, while the bricks used for the tomb interior suggested a date prior to 74 BCE. Additionally, the height of the tomb fit the specifications for a member of the Han nobility, and the terracotta figures accompanying the burial were specifically used by the imperial house. Finally, researchers examined the deceased's bones and found that they belonged to an adult female, leading them to conclude that the tomb was that of Princess Eyi.
