= Li Guangli =

Chinese military general

- Traditional Chinese: 李廣利
- Simplified Chinese: 李广利
Transcriptions
Standard Mandarin
- Hanyu Pinyin: Lǐ Guǎnglì
- Wade–Giles: Li Kuang-li

Li Guangli (died 89 BC) was a Chinese military general of the Western Han dynasty and a member of the Li family favoured by Emperor Wu of Han. His brother Li Yannian was also close to Emperor Wu. With the suicide of Emperor Wu's crown prince Liu Ju in 91 BC, his nephew Liu Bo was among the candidates for the title of crown prince.

Li was a brother-in-law of Emperor Wu, whose favourite concubine was his sister Lady Li, and was the chosen general in the War of the Heavenly Horses. His supplies for his second sortie are described as being 100,000 cattle, 30,000 horses, and many mules and camels.

Li besieged the city of Erh-shih (probably near Samarkand) to obtain certain fine horses of the Ferghana that had been demanded by the Han Empire but refused. He was given the title "General of Erh-shih" (貳師將軍) in expectation of success. He diverted the river that supplied the inner city with water, and he "received three thousand horses in tribute."

In 90 BC, when Li was campaigning in the north against the Xiongnu Empire, his wife was imprisoned in the capital after being involved in a political scandal involving their in-law Liu Qumao (one of Liu's sons had married one of the Li's daughters). Li sought a quick victory, hoping to win his wife's release. He overextended his army and was decisively defeated by a Xiongnu army of 50,000 led by their Chanyu Hulugu. Li surrendered to the Xiongnu, and the Chanyu gave him his daughter for marriage. However, about a year later, he was executed, becoming a human sacrifice, after having a conflict with Wei Lü (衛律), another Han defector who was favoured by the Chanyu.
