= Yangjiawan terracotta army =

Funeral terracotta army in Shaanxi, China

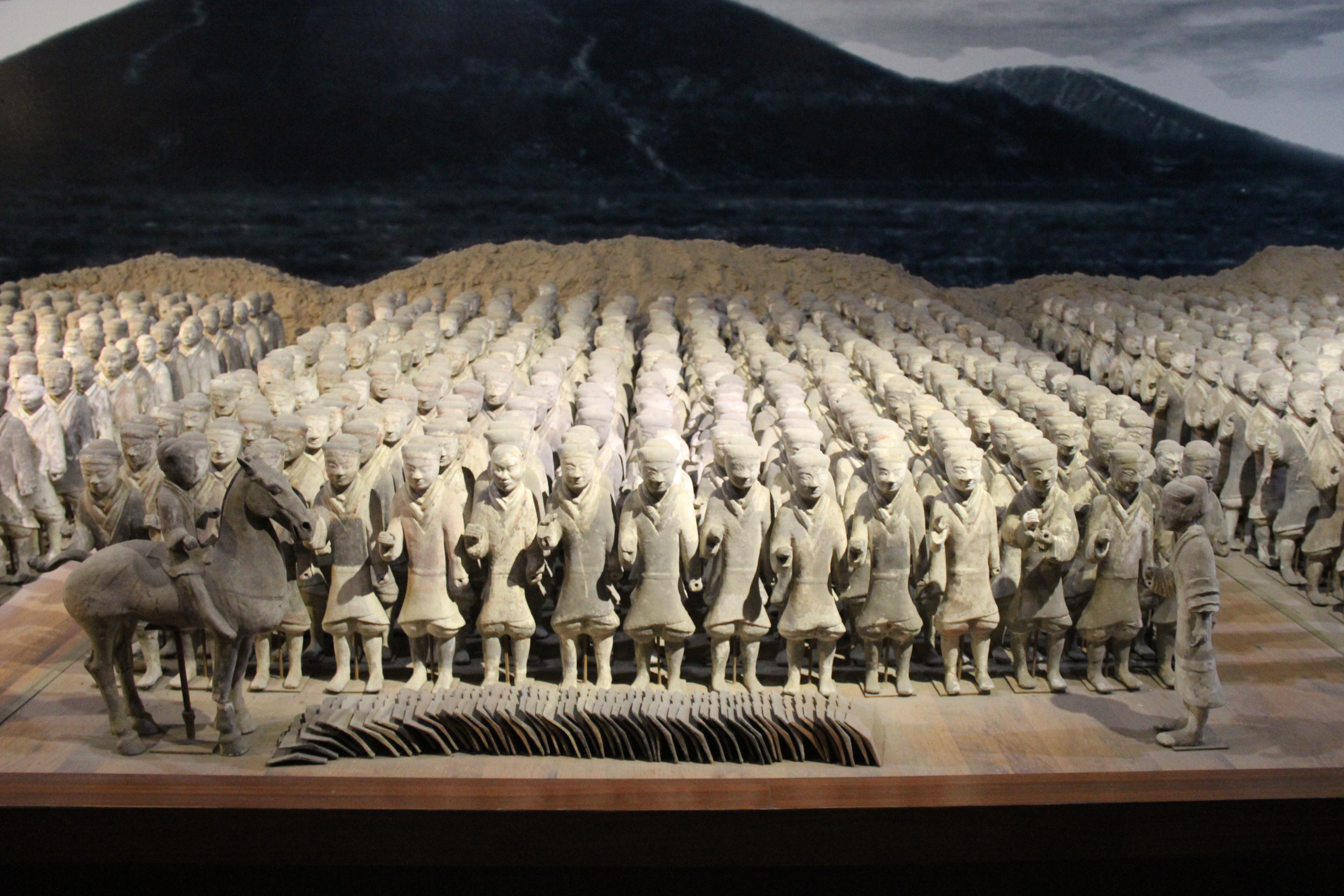
Western Han Terracotta Army of Yangjiawan

The Yangjiawan terracotta army (Ch: 杨家湾兵马俑) is a small funeral terracotta army of the Western Han period, which was excavated in Yangjiawan, in the region of Xianyang, Shaanxi, a few kilometers north of Xi'an. The terracotta army belong to auxiliary tombs to the mausoleum of the first Han Emperor Gaozu (ruled 202–195 BCE) at Changling. The terracottas are now on display in the Xianyang Museum. One of the tombs (Yangjiawan 4) is thought to have belonged to the Western Han general Zhou Bo, who died in 169, or his son. The tomb has about 3,000 cavalry statuettes, with an approximate height of 60 cm.

Compared to the early and much more famous Terracotta Army of the first Qin dynasty Emperor Qin Shihuang (210 BCE), the terracotta statue of Yangjiawan are much smaller in size, but also much less militaristic, much softer and elegant in their style: "Horse tails curl in fanciful fashion and human figures possess a doll-like innocence". All this was possibly in response to the Han perception of Qin Shihuang as a tyrannical ruler. Still, they continue a trend in naturalistic sculpture which was initiated by the Terracotta Army of Qin Shihuang, departing from the much simpler and sparser sculptural tradition of the preceding centuries, as seen in the Taerpo horserider (4th-3rd century BCE) for example.

== Gallery ==
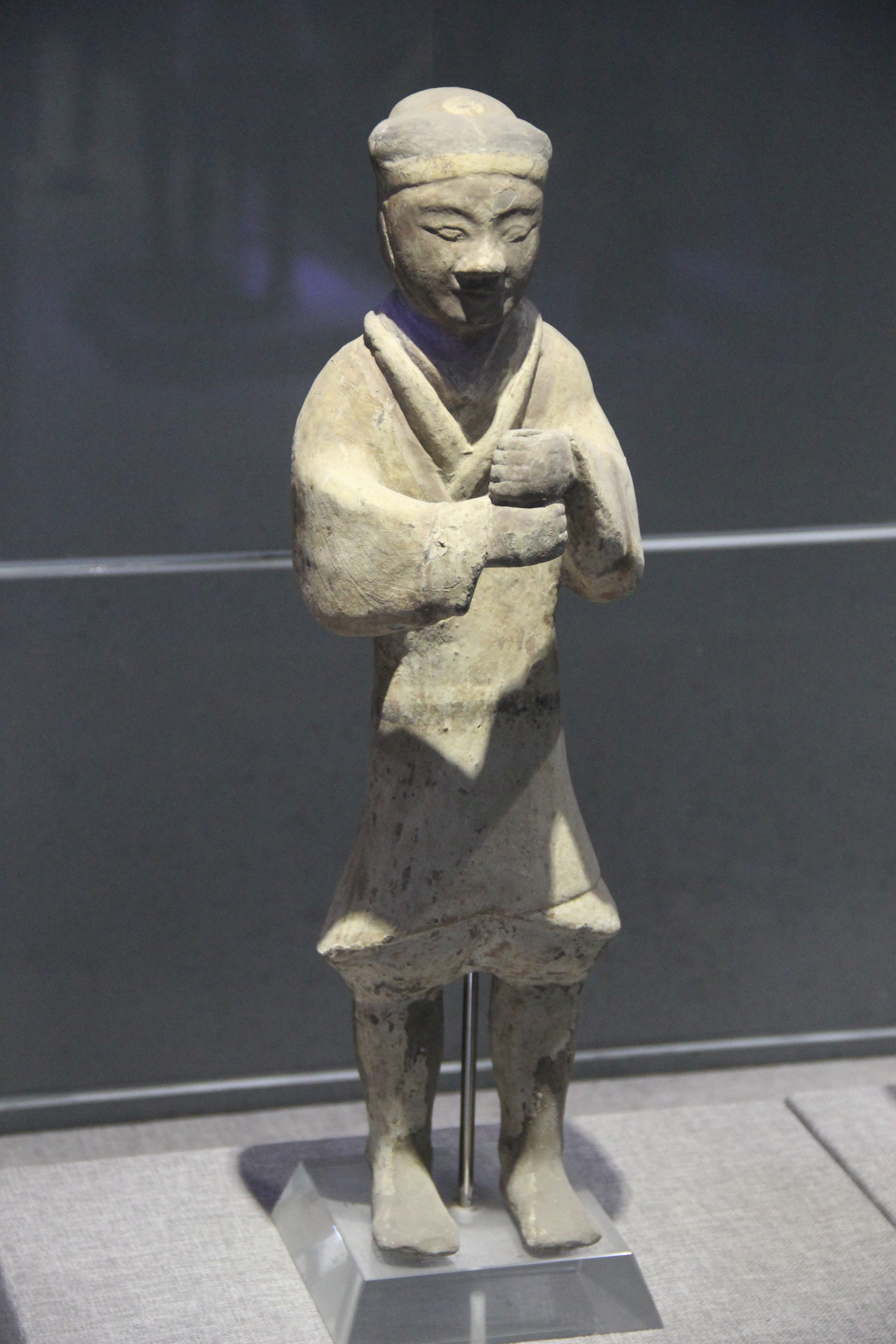
Flag holder

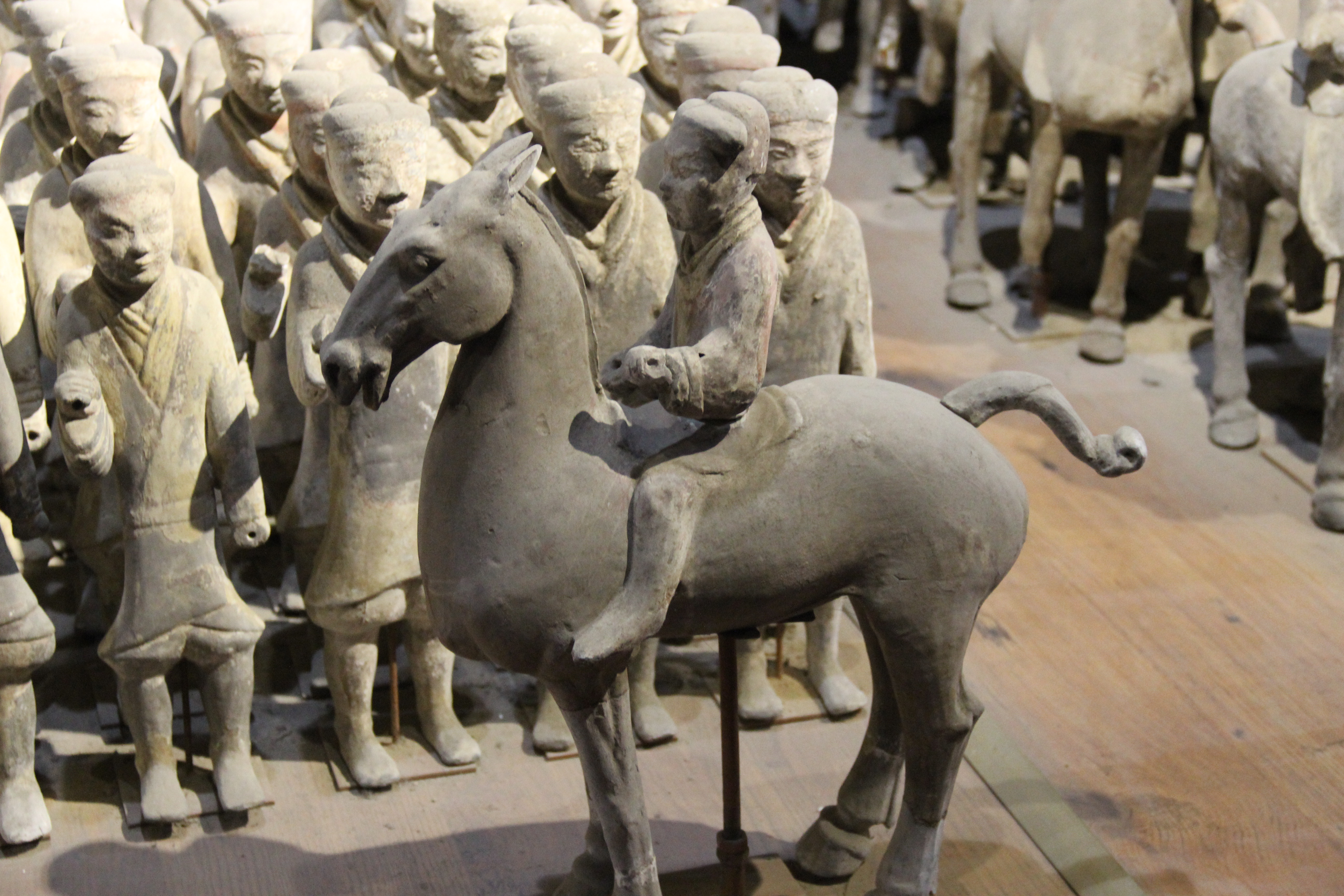
Horserider and foot soldiers, Western Han Terracotta Army of Yangjiawan

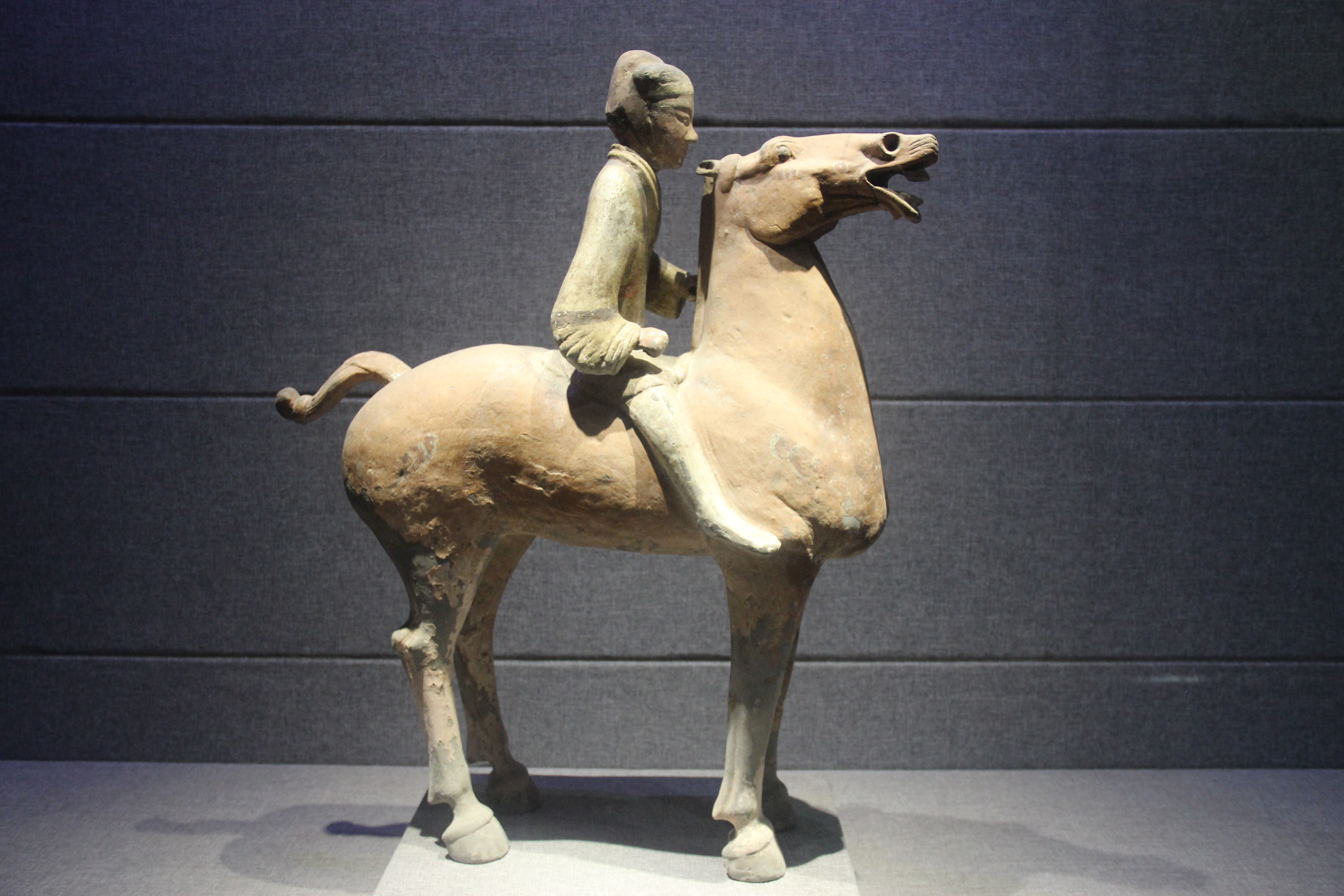
Large cavalryman

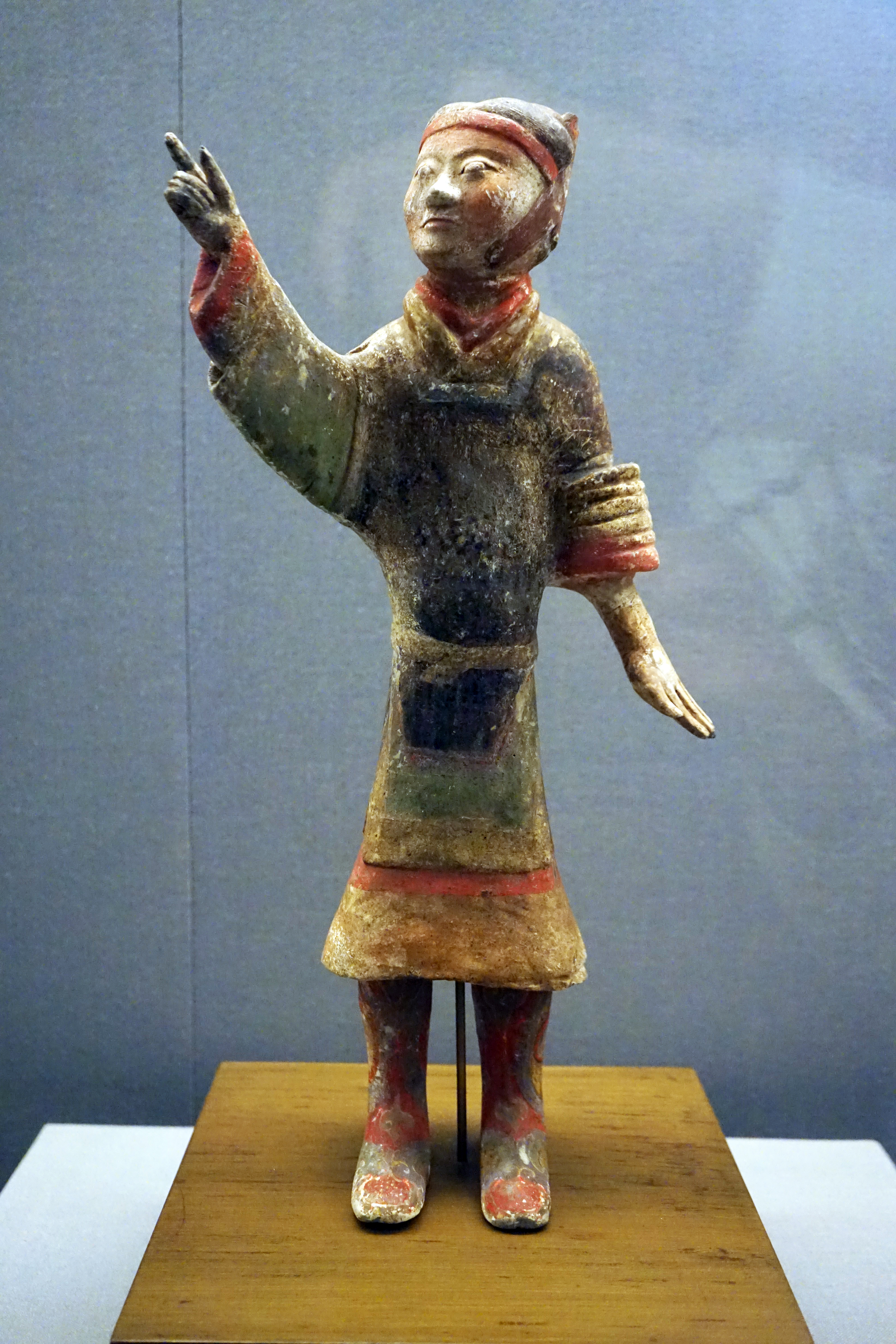
A painted soldier

== See also ==
- Yangling terracotta army
