= Lady Gouyi =

Consort of Emperor Wu of Han

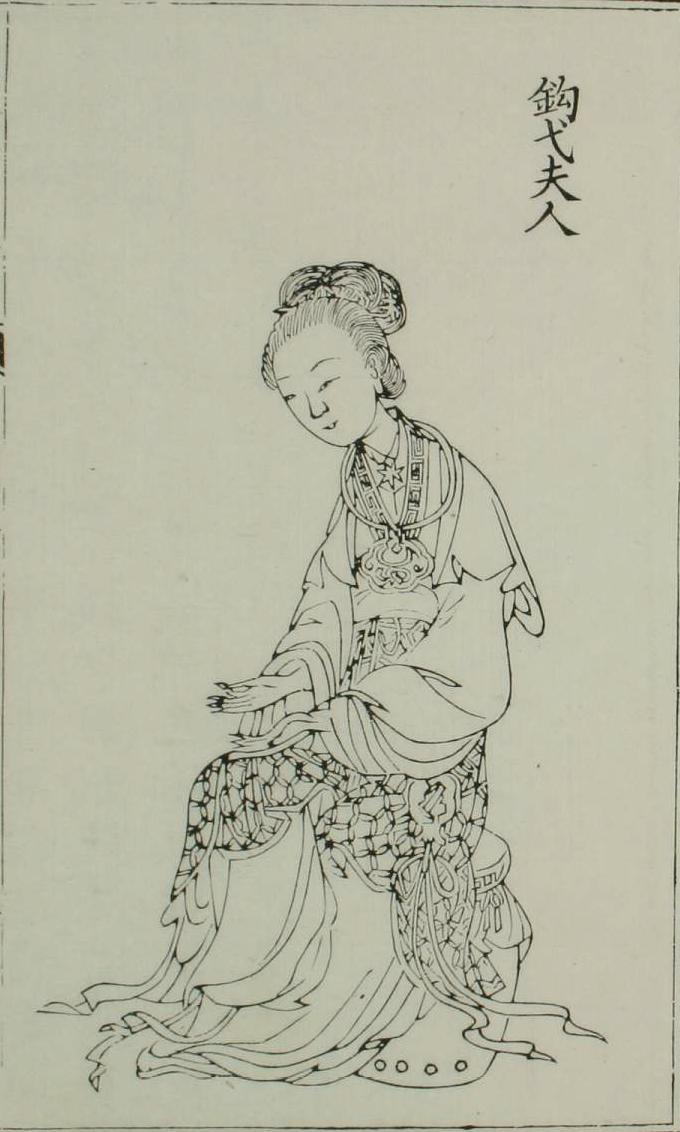
An 18th-century portrayal of Lady Gouyi from the Qing dynasty book Bai mei xin yong

Lady Gouyi (Chinese: 鉤弋夫人; pinyin: Gōuyì Fūrén; Wade–Giles: Kou-i Fu-jen; 113–88 BC), also known as Zhao Jieyu (Chinese: 趙婕妤; Consort Zhao), or Zhao Gouyi (趙鉤弋), was a consort of Emperor Wu of the Chinese Han dynasty, and the mother of Emperor Zhao of Han.

Near the end of his long reign, Emperor Wu made her young son Liu Fuling his heir apparent, but ordered the death of Lady Gouyi to prevent her from usurping power from the boy emperor. After Fuling acceded to the throne, he posthumously named her as empress dowager and built for her the Yunling mausoleum, which is now a Major Historical and Cultural Site of China.

== Life ==
Lady Gouyi was a native of Hejian Commandery, born into the Zhao family. Her given name is unknown. Her father was castrated after committing an offence and served as a minor eunuch in Chang'an (now Xi'an), the capital of the Han empire.

It was said that Lady Gouyi's fists were always clenched. When Emperor Wu of Han was having a hunting expedition in Hejian, Zhao was summoned to his presence. When the emperor touched her hands, her fists miraculously opened up, revealing a jade hook in one of them. Emperor Wu was pleased and took her as a consort, naming her Lady Quan ("fist") and Lady Gouyi ("hook"). Awarded the consort rank of 婕妤 (jieyu, meaning "handsome fairness"), she was also known as Zhao Jieyu.

Zhao Jieyu lived in the Gouyi Palace, within the imperial Ganquan Palace outside of Chang'an. It was said that following a 14-month pregnancy—the same length as the mythical Emperor Yao, she gave birth to a son, named Liu Fuling, in 94 BC. Emperor Wu was pleased with the child's connection with the sage emperor, and named a gate in the palace the "Gate of Yao's Mother".

The favour shown to Lady Gouyi and her son led to speculations that Emperor Wu wanted to demote Crown Prince Liu Ju, the son of Empress Wei Zifu, and make Fuling the heir apparent. The court was thrown into chaos when there were accusations of witchcraft and necromancy (巫蠱之禍) implicating Prince Ju and the empress. Hundreds of people were executed and Empress Wei and Prince Ju were both forced to commit suicide in 91 BC.

== Death ==
After much hesitation, Emperor Wu made Fuling the heir apparent. Because Fuling was a child, the emperor feared that Lady Gouyi would seize power after his death, as Empress Lü had done after the death of Emperor Gao about a century earlier. Emperor Wu appointed the trusted official Huo Guang as the future regent, and summoned Lady Gouyi. He berated her for no apparent reason and ordered her imprisonment. When she kowtowed and looked at him in bewilderment, he said "Out, quickly! You cannot be saved!" She was taken to prison and died soon afterward in 88 BC.

According to the Book of Han, she died of "anxiety", whereas Sima Guang's Zizhi Tongjian explicitly states that she was "ordered to die". Modern scholars generally agree that she was killed.

After her death, Emperor Wu explained to his attendants that a child emperor with a young mother would lead to unrest, and the empress dowager would wield unchecked and absolute power as Empress Lü did, although he acknowledged that his action might be misunderstood by "children and fools".

== Mausoleum ==
Emperor Wu died in 87 BC, and the young Prince Fuling acceded to the throne as Emperor Zhao of Han. He conferred the title empress dowager to his mother posthumously, and mobilized 20,000 troops to construct a mausoleum for Lady Gouyi, called the Yunling. He established the Yunling County and moved 3,000 households there to look after the tomb.

The Yunling, located in modern Chunhua County, Shaanxi Province, was declared a Major National Historical and Cultural Site (designation 7-0667) in 2013. The mausoleum was robbed in July 2016. In November 2017, the Shaanxi Police arrested 91 suspected tomb robbers and smugglers and recovered more than 1,100 artifacts.

== Legends ==
Over the centuries, many legends grew out of the death of Lady Gouyi. It was said that her body did not become cold in death and emitted a fragrance, and that when her coffin was later opened, there was nothing inside but a silk slipper. She became revered as a Taoist immortal. Another legend, recorded in the Yunyang ji, says that Emperor Wu built a rostrum in the Ganquan Palace to communicate with Lady Gouyi's spirit. A blue bird often perched on the rostrum, but disappeared after Emperor Xuan acceded to the throne in 73 BC.
