= List of emperors of the Han dynasty =

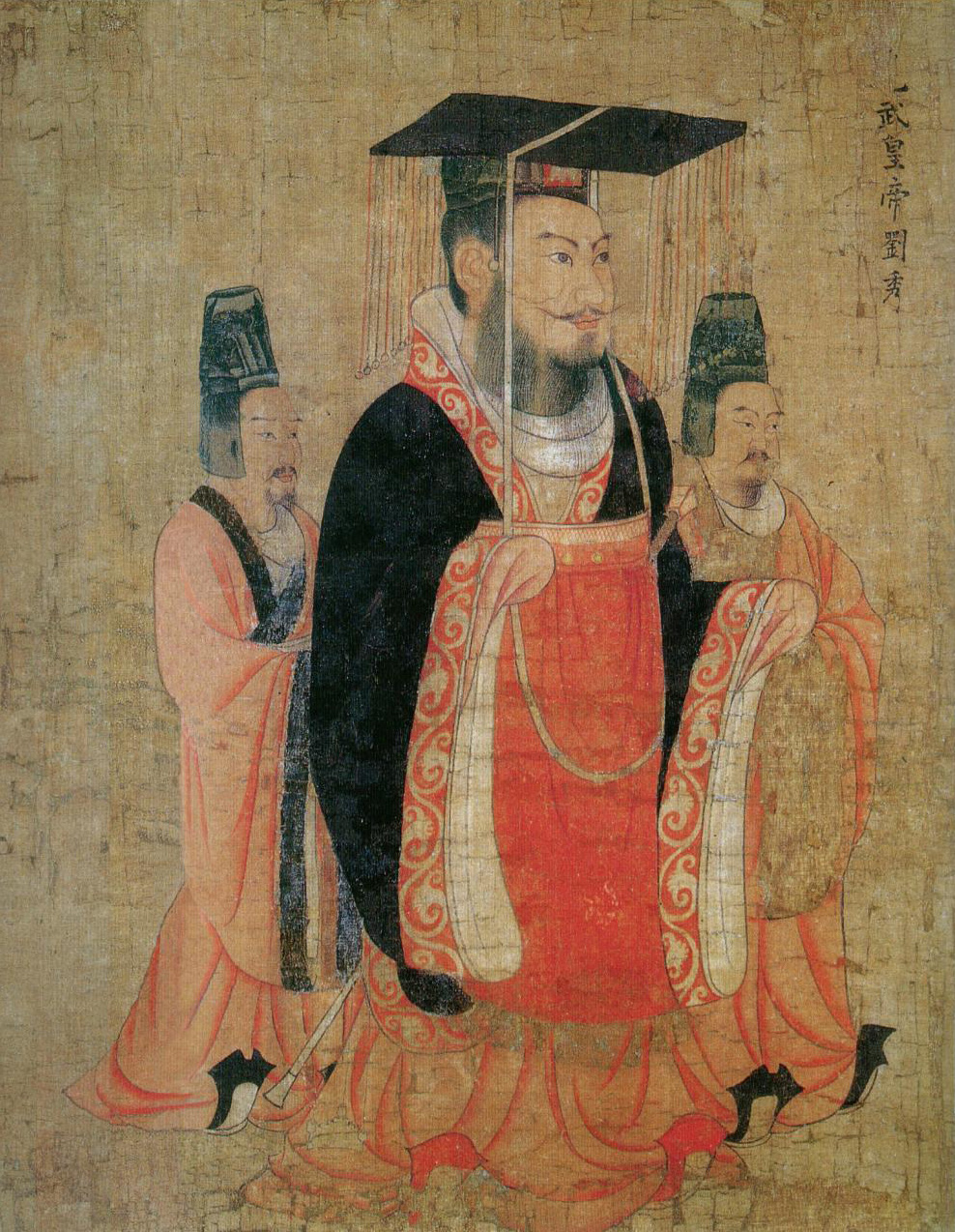
Emperor Guangwu of Han (r. 25–57 AD), as depicted by the Tang artist Yan Liben (600–673)

The emperors of the Han dynasty were the supreme heads of government during the second imperial dynasty of China; the Han dynasty (202 BC – 220 AD) followed the Qin dynasty (221–206 BC) and preceded the Three Kingdoms (220–265 AD). The era is conventionally periodised into the Western Han (202 BC – 9 AD) and Eastern Han (25–220 AD).

The Han dynasty was founded by the peasant rebel leader Liu Bang, known posthumously as Emperor Gao (r. 202–195 BC). The longest reigning emperor of the dynasty was Emperor Wu (r. 141–87 BC), who reigned for 54 years. The dynasty was briefly interrupted by the Xin dynasty of the former regent Wang Mang, but he was killed during a rebellion on 6 October 23 AD. The Han dynasty was reestablished by Liu Xiu, known posthumously as Emperor Guangwu (r. 25–57 AD) or Guangwu Di, who claimed the throne on 5 August 25 AD. The last Han emperor, Emperor Xian (r. 189–220 AD), was a puppet monarch of Chancellor Cao Cao (155–220 AD), who dominated the court and was made King of Wei. On 11 December 220, Cao's son Pi usurped the throne as Emperor Wen of Wei (r. 220–226 AD) and ended the Han dynasty.

The emperor was the supreme head of government. He appointed all of the highest-ranking officials in central, provincial, commandery, and county administrations. He also functioned as a lawgiver, the highest court judge, commander-in-chief of the armed forces, and high priest of the state-sponsored religious cults.

== Naming conventions ==
=== Emperor ===
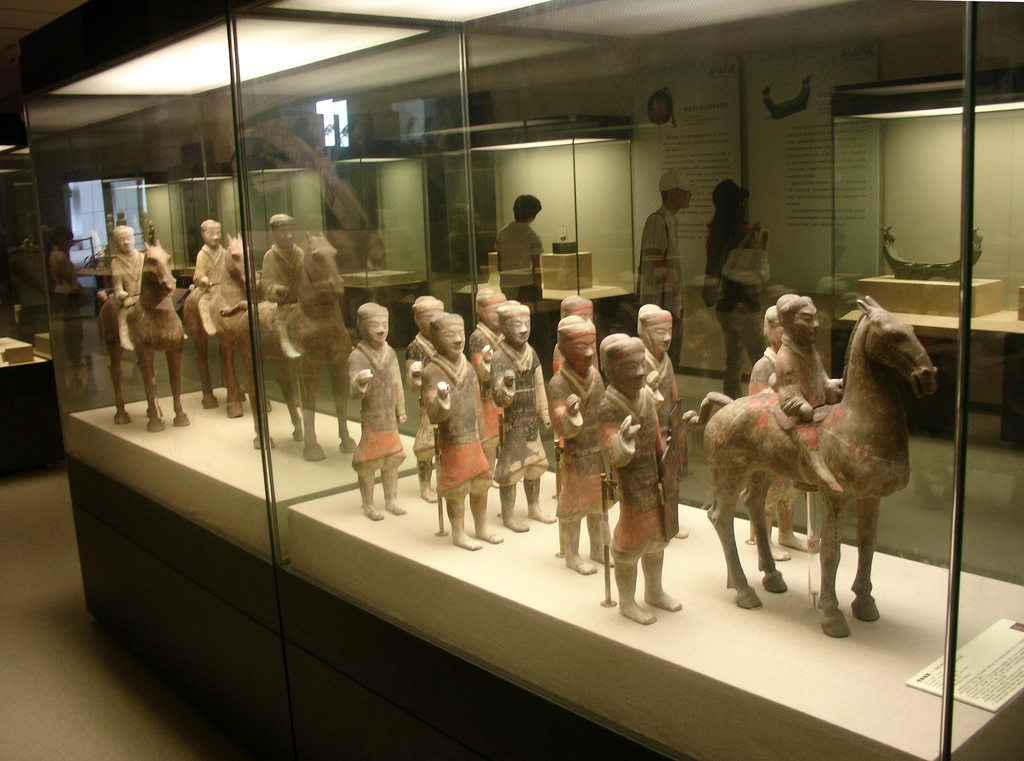
Western Han pottery miniatures of infantry (foreground) and cavalry (background) from a royal tomb

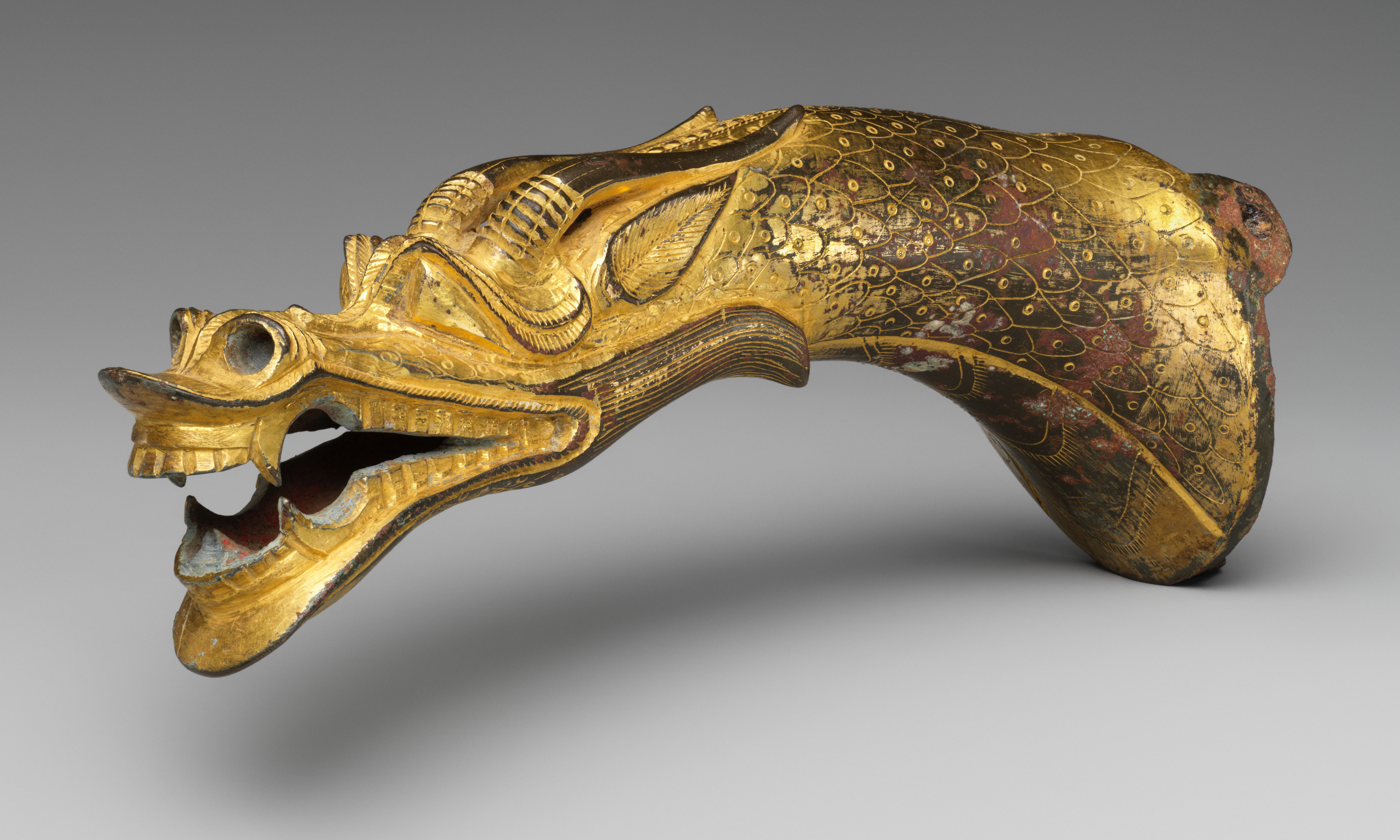
An Eastern Han gilded bronze handle with traces of red pigment, in the shape of a dragon's head; for Han emperors, the dragon could represent either good or bad omens depending on circumstance.

The rulers of the previous Shang (c. 1600 – c. 1050 BC) and Zhou (c. 1056 – 256 BC) dynasties were referred to as 'king' (王 wáng). By the time of the Zhou dynasty, they were also referred to as the Son of Heaven. In 221 BC, King Ying Zheng of Qin completed the conquest of all the Warring States of ancient China. To elevate himself above the Shang and Zhou kings, he accepted the new title of Emperor (皇帝 huángdì) and is known to posterity as Qin Shi Huang, the 'First Emperor' of Qin. The new title of emperor was created by combining the titles for the Three Sovereigns and Five Emperors from Chinese mythology. This title was used by each successive ruler of China until the fall of the Qing dynasty in 1911.

=== Posthumous, temple, and era names ===
From the Shang until the Sui dynasty (581–618) dynasty, Chinese rulers (both kings and emperors) were referred to by their posthumous names in records and historical texts. Temple names, first used during the reign of Emperor Jing of Han (r. 157–141 BC), were used exclusively in later records and historical texts when referring to emperors who reigned during the Tang (618–907), Song (960–1279), and Yuan (1271–1368) dynasties. During the Ming (1368–1644) and Qing (1644–1911) dynasties, a single era name was used for each emperor's reign and became the preferred way to refer to Ming and Qing emperors in historical texts.

Use of the era name was formally adopted during the reign of Emperor Wu of Han (r. 141–87 BC), yet its origins can be traced back further. The oldest method of recording years—which had existed since the Shang—set the first year of a ruler's reign as year one. When an emperor died, the first year of a new reign period would begin. This system was changed by the 4th century BC when the first year of a new reign period did not begin until the first day of the lunar New Year following a ruler's death. When Duke Huiwen of Qin assumed the title of king in 324 BC, he changed the year count of his reign back to the first year. For his newly adopted calendar established in 163 BC, Emperor Wen of Han (r. 180–157 BC) also set the year count of his reign back to the beginning.

Since six was considered a lucky number, the emperors Jing and Wu changed the year count of their reigns back to the beginning every six years. Since every six-year period was successively marked as yuannian (元年), eryuan (二元), sanyuan (三元), and so forth, this system was considered too cumbersome by the time it reached the fifth cycle wuyuan sannian (五元三年) in 114 BC. In that year, a government official suggested that the Han court retrospectively rename every "beginning" with new characters; Emperor Wu accepted this reform in 110 BC. Since Emperor Wu had just performed the religious Feng Shan sacrifice at Mount Taishan, he named the new era yuanfeng (元封). This event is regarded as the formal establishment of era names in Chinese history. Emperor Wu changed the era name once more when he established the 'Great Beginning' (太初 Taichu) calendar in 104 BC. From this point until the end of Western Han, the court established a new era name every four years of an emperor's reign. By the Eastern Han, there was no set interval for establishing new era names, which were often introduced for political reasons and celebrating auspicious events.

== Regents and empress dowagers ==
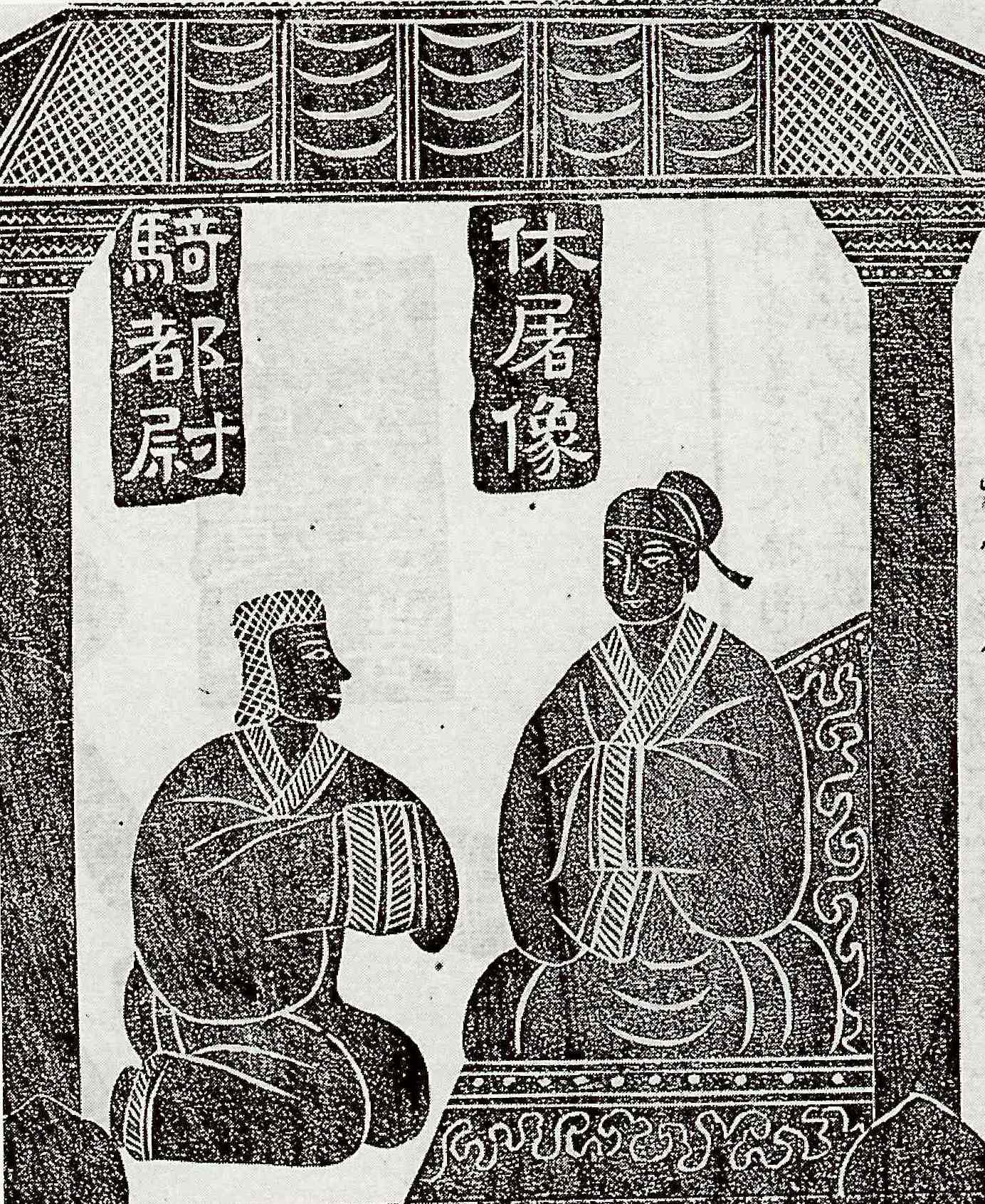
An ink rubbing of The story of Jin Midi, a 2nd-century AD stone relief at the Wu Liang shrines in Jiaxiang, Shandong

At times, especially when an infant emperor was placed on the throne, a regent, often the empress dowager or one of her male relatives, would assume the duties of the emperor until he reached his majority. Sometimes the empress dowager's faction—the consort clan—was overthrown in a coup d'état. For example, Empress Lü Zhi (d. 180 BC) was the de facto ruler of the court during the reigns of the child emperors Qianshao (r. 188–184 BC) and Houshao (r. 184–180 BC). Her faction was overthrown during the Lü Clan disturbance of 180 BC and Liu Heng was named emperor (posthumously known as Emperor Wen). Before Emperor Wu died in 87 BC, he had invested Huo Guang (d. 68 BC), Jin Midi (d. 86 BC), and Shangguan Jie (上官桀; d. 80 BC) with the power to govern as regents over his successor Emperor Zhao of Han (r. 87–74 BC). Huo Guang and Shangguan Jie were both grandfathers to Empress Shangguan (d. 37 BC), wife of Emperor Zhao, while the ethnically-Xiongnu Jin Midi was a former slave who had worked in an imperial stable. After Jin died and Shangguan was executed for treason, Huo Guang was the sole ruling regent. Following his death, the Huo family faction was overthrown by Emperor Xuan of Han (r. 74–49 BC), in revenge for Huo Guang poisoning his wife Empress Xu Pingjun (d. 71 BC) so that he could marry Huo's daughter Empress Huo Chengjun (d. 54 BC).

== List of emperors ==
Below is a complete list of emperors of the Han dynasty, including their personal, posthumous, and era names. Excluded from the list are de facto rulers such as regents and empress dowagers.

Western Han (202 BC – 9 AD)
Sovereign	Personal name		Reigned from	Reigned until	Posthumous name (Note: Besides Liu Bang and Liu Xiu, the word xiao (孝 'filial') was prefixed to all posthumous names, although it is usually omitted by scholars. The word huangdi (皇帝 emperor) is also abbreviated. Commonly only the second character is used; e.g., Wudi (武帝, Emperor Wu) for Xiaowu Huangdi (孝武皇帝).)		Temple name		Era name		Years (Note: The years of the Chinese lunisolar calendar do not correspond exactly with the years given in the column for era names. Some years given in the table also belong to two reign periods because some era names were adopted before the beginning of the following year.)
Emperor Gaozu	Liu Bang	劉邦	28 February 202 BC	1 June 195 BC	Emperor Gao	高皇帝	Taizu	太祖	—		
Emperor Hui	Liu Ying	劉盈	23 June 195 BC	26 September 188 BC	Emperor Xiaohui	孝惠皇帝	—N/a		—		
Emperor Qianshao	Liu Gong	劉恭	19 October 188 BC	15 June 184 BC	—N/a		—N/a		—		
Emperor Houshao	Liu Hong	劉弘	15 June 184 BC	14 November 180 BC	—N/a		—N/a		—		
Emperor Wen	Liu Heng	劉恆	14 November 180 BC	6 July 157 BC	Emperor Xiaowen	孝文皇帝	Taizong	太宗	Qianyuan	前元	179–164 BC
Emperor Wen	Liu Heng	劉恆	14 November 180 BC	6 July 157 BC	Emperor Xiaowen	孝文皇帝	Taizong	太宗	Houyuan	後元	163–156 BC
Emperor Jing	Liu Qi	劉啟	14 July 157 BC	9 March 141 BC	Emperor Xiaojing	孝景皇帝	—N/a		Qianyuan	前元	156–150 BC
Emperor Jing	Liu Qi	劉啟	14 July 157 BC	9 March 141 BC	Emperor Xiaojing	孝景皇帝	—N/a		Zhongyuan	中元	149–143 BC
Emperor Jing	Liu Qi	劉啟	14 July 157 BC	9 March 141 BC	Emperor Xiaojing	孝景皇帝	—N/a		Houyuan	後元	143–141 BC
Emperor Wu	Liu Che	劉徹	10 March 141 BC	29 March 87 BC	Emperor Xiaowu	孝武皇帝	Shizong	世宗	Jianyuan	建元	141–135 BC
Emperor Wu	Liu Che	劉徹	10 March 141 BC	29 March 87 BC	Emperor Xiaowu	孝武皇帝	Shizong	世宗	Yuanguang	元光	134–129 BC
Emperor Wu	Liu Che	劉徹	10 March 141 BC	29 March 87 BC	Emperor Xiaowu	孝武皇帝	Shizong	世宗	Yuanshuo	元朔	128–123 BC
Emperor Wu	Liu Che	劉徹	10 March 141 BC	29 March 87 BC	Emperor Xiaowu	孝武皇帝	Shizong	世宗	Yuanshou	元狩	122–117 BC
Emperor Wu	Liu Che	劉徹	10 March 141 BC	29 March 87 BC	Emperor Xiaowu	孝武皇帝	Shizong	世宗	Yuanding	元鼎	116–111 BC
Emperor Wu	Liu Che	劉徹	10 March 141 BC	29 March 87 BC	Emperor Xiaowu	孝武皇帝	Shizong	世宗	Yuanfeng	元封	110–105 BC
Emperor Wu	Liu Che	劉徹	10 March 141 BC	29 March 87 BC	Emperor Xiaowu	孝武皇帝	Shizong	世宗	Taichu	太初	104–101 BC
Emperor Wu	Liu Che	劉徹	10 March 141 BC	29 March 87 BC	Emperor Xiaowu	孝武皇帝	Shizong	世宗	Tianhan	天漢	100–97 BC
Emperor Wu	Liu Che	劉徹	10 March 141 BC	29 March 87 BC	Emperor Xiaowu	孝武皇帝	Shizong	世宗	Taishi	太始	96–93 BC
Emperor Wu	Liu Che	劉徹	10 March 141 BC	29 March 87 BC	Emperor Xiaowu	孝武皇帝	Shizong	世宗	Zhenghe	征和	92–89 BC
Emperor Wu	Liu Che	劉徹	10 March 141 BC	29 March 87 BC	Emperor Xiaowu	孝武皇帝	Shizong	世宗	Houyuan	後元	88–87 BC
Emperor Zhao	Liu Fuling	劉弗陵	30 March 87 BC	5 June 74 BC	Emperor Xiaozhao	孝昭皇帝	—N/a		Shiyuan	始元	86–80 BC
Emperor Zhao	Liu Fuling	劉弗陵	30 March 87 BC	5 June 74 BC	Emperor Xiaozhao	孝昭皇帝	—N/a		Yuanfeng	元鳳	80–75 BC
Emperor Zhao	Liu Fuling	劉弗陵	30 March 87 BC	5 June 74 BC	Emperor Xiaozhao	孝昭皇帝	—N/a		Yuanping	元平	74 BC
Marquis of Haihun	Liu He	劉賀	18 July; 74 BC	14 August 74 BC	—N/a		—N/a		Yuanping	元平	74 BC
Emperor Xuan	Liu Bingyi	劉病已	10 September 74 BC	10 January 49 BC	Emperor Xiaoxuan	孝宣皇帝	Zhongzong	中宗	Benshi	本始	73–70 BC
Emperor Xuan	Liu Bingyi	劉病已	10 September 74 BC	10 January 49 BC	Emperor Xiaoxuan	孝宣皇帝	Zhongzong	中宗	Dijie	地節	69–66 BC
Emperor Xuan	Liu Bingyi	劉病已	10 September 74 BC	10 January 49 BC	Emperor Xiaoxuan	孝宣皇帝	Zhongzong	中宗	Yuankang	元康	65–61 BC
Emperor Xuan	Liu Bingyi	劉病已	10 September 74 BC	10 January 49 BC	Emperor Xiaoxuan	孝宣皇帝	Zhongzong	中宗	Shenjue	神爵	61–58 BC
Emperor Xuan	Liu Bingyi	劉病已	10 September 74 BC	10 January 49 BC	Emperor Xiaoxuan	孝宣皇帝	Zhongzong	中宗	Wufeng	五鳳	57–54 BC
Emperor Xuan	Liu Bingyi	劉病已	10 September 74 BC	10 January 49 BC	Emperor Xiaoxuan	孝宣皇帝	Zhongzong	中宗	Ganlu	甘露	53–50 BC
Emperor Xuan	Liu Bingyi	劉病已	10 September 74 BC	10 January 49 BC	Emperor Xiaoxuan	孝宣皇帝	Zhongzong	中宗	Huanglong	黃龍	49 BC
Emperor Yuan	Liu Shi	劉奭	29 January 49 BC	8 July 33 BC	Emperor Xiaoyuan	孝元皇帝	Gaozong	高宗	Chuyuan	初元	48–44 BC
Emperor Yuan	Liu Shi	劉奭	29 January 49 BC	8 July 33 BC	Emperor Xiaoyuan	孝元皇帝	Gaozong	高宗	Yongguang	永光	43–39 BC
Emperor Yuan	Liu Shi	劉奭	29 January 49 BC	8 July 33 BC	Emperor Xiaoyuan	孝元皇帝	Gaozong	高宗	Jianzhao	建昭	38–34 BC
Emperor Yuan	Liu Shi	劉奭	29 January 49 BC	8 July 33 BC	Emperor Xiaoyuan	孝元皇帝	Gaozong	高宗	Jingning	竟寧	33 BC
Emperor Cheng	Liu Ao	劉驁	4 August 33 BC	17 April; 7 BC	Emperor Xiaocheng	孝成皇帝	Tongzong	統宗	Jianshi	建始	32–28 BC
Emperor Cheng	Liu Ao	劉驁	4 August 33 BC	17 April; 7 BC	Emperor Xiaocheng	孝成皇帝	Tongzong	統宗	Heping	河平	28–25 BC
Emperor Cheng	Liu Ao	劉驁	4 August 33 BC	17 April; 7 BC	Emperor Xiaocheng	孝成皇帝	Tongzong	統宗	Yangshuo	陽朔	24–21 BC
Emperor Cheng	Liu Ao	劉驁	4 August 33 BC	17 April; 7 BC	Emperor Xiaocheng	孝成皇帝	Tongzong	統宗	Hongjia	鴻嘉	20–17 BC
Emperor Cheng	Liu Ao	劉驁	4 August 33 BC	17 April; 7 BC	Emperor Xiaocheng	孝成皇帝	Tongzong	統宗	Yongshi	永始	16–13 BC
Emperor Cheng	Liu Ao	劉驁	4 August 33 BC	17 April; 7 BC	Emperor Xiaocheng	孝成皇帝	Tongzong	統宗	Yuanyan	元延	12–9 BC
Emperor Cheng	Liu Ao	劉驁	4 August 33 BC	17 April; 7 BC	Emperor Xiaocheng	孝成皇帝	Tongzong	統宗	Suihe	綏和	8–7 BC
Emperor Ai	Liu Xin	劉欣	7 May; 7 BC	15 August 1 BC	Emperor Xiao'ai	孝哀皇帝	—N/a		Jianping	建平	6–3 BC
Emperor Ai	Liu Xin	劉欣	7 May; 7 BC	15 August 1 BC	Emperor Xiao'ai	孝哀皇帝	—N/a		Yuanshou	元壽	2–1 BC
Emperor Ping	Liu Kan	劉衎	17 October 1 BC	3 February 6 AD	Emperor Xiaoping	孝平皇帝	Yuanzong	元宗	Yuanshi	元始	1–5 AD
Ruzi Ying (Note: Ruzi was prince, rather than emperor of Han. Officially, the throne of emperor of Han was vacant during 6–9 AD.)	Liu Ying	劉嬰	17 April; 6 AD	10 January 9 AD	—N/a		—N/a		Jushe	居攝	6–8 AD
Ruzi Ying	Liu Ying	劉嬰	17 April; 6 AD	10 January 9 AD	—N/a		—N/a		Chushi	初始	9 AD

Continuation of the Han under the Xin dynasty (9–23 AD)
Sovereign	Personal name		Reigned from	Reigned until	Posthumous name		Temple name		Era name		Years
Gengshi Emperor	Liu Xuan	劉玄	11 March 23 AD	November 25 AD	King Wushun of Huaiyang	淮陽王	Yanzong	延宗	Gengshi	更始	23–25 AD

Eastern Han (25–220 AD)
Sovereign	Personal name		Reigned from	Reigned until	Posthumous name		Temple name		Era name		Years
Emperor Guangwu	Liu Xiu	劉秀	5 August 25 AD	29 March 57 AD	Emperor Guangwu	光武皇帝	Shizu	世祖	Jianwu	建武	25–56 AD
Emperor Guangwu	Liu Xiu	劉秀	5 August 25 AD	29 March 57 AD	Emperor Guangwu	光武皇帝	Shizu	世祖	Jianwu-zhongyuan	建武中元	56–57 AD
Emperor Ming	Liu Zhuang	劉莊	29 March 57 AD	5 September 75 AD	Emperor Xiaoming	孝明皇帝	Xianzong	顯宗	Yongping	永平	57–75 AD
Emperor Zhang	Liu Da	劉炟	5 September 75 AD	9 April; 88 AD	Emperor Xiaozhang	孝章皇帝	Suzong	肃宗	Jianchu	建初	76–84 AD
Emperor Zhang	Liu Da	劉炟	5 September 75 AD	9 April; 88 AD	Emperor Xiaozhang	孝章皇帝	Suzong	肃宗	Yuanhe	元和	84–87 AD
Emperor Zhang	Liu Da	劉炟	5 September 75 AD	9 April; 88 AD	Emperor Xiaozhang	孝章皇帝	Suzong	肃宗	Zhanghe	章和	87–88 AD
Emperor He	Liu Zhao	劉肇	9 April 88 AD	13 February 106 AD	Emperor Xiaohe	孝和皇帝	Muzong	穆宗	Yongyuan	永元	89–105 AD
Emperor He	Liu Zhao	劉肇	9 April 88 AD	13 February 106 AD	Emperor Xiaohe	孝和皇帝	Muzong	穆宗	Yuanxing	元興	105 AD
Emperor Shang	Liu Long	劉隆	13 February 106 AD	21 September 106 AD	Emperor Xiaoshang	孝殤皇帝	—N/a		Yanping	延平	106 AD
Emperor An	Liu Hu	劉祜	23 September 106 AD	30 April 125 AD	Emperor Xiao'an	孝安皇帝	Gongzong	恭宗	Yongchu	永初	107–113 AD
Emperor An	Liu Hu	劉祜	23 September 106 AD	30 April 125 AD	Emperor Xiao'an	孝安皇帝	Gongzong	恭宗	Yuanchu	元初	114–120 AD
Emperor An	Liu Hu	劉祜	23 September 106 AD	30 April 125 AD	Emperor Xiao'an	孝安皇帝	Gongzong	恭宗	Yongning	永寧	120–121 AD
Emperor An	Liu Hu	劉祜	23 September 106 AD	30 April 125 AD	Emperor Xiao'an	孝安皇帝	Gongzong	恭宗	Jianguang	建光	121–122 AD
Emperor An	Liu Hu	劉祜	23 September 106 AD	30 April 125 AD	Emperor Xiao'an	孝安皇帝	Gongzong	恭宗	Yanguang	延光	122–125 AD
Marquess of Beixiang	Liu Yi	劉懿	18 May 125 AD	10 December 125 AD	—N/a		—N/a		Yanguang	延光	125 AD
Emperor Shun	Liu Bao	劉保	16 December 125 AD	20 September 144 AD	Emperor Xiaoshun	孝順皇帝	Jingzong	敬宗	Yongjian	永建	126–132 AD
Emperor Shun	Liu Bao	劉保	16 December 125 AD	20 September 144 AD	Emperor Xiaoshun	孝順皇帝	Jingzong	敬宗	Yangjia	陽嘉	132–135 AD
Emperor Shun	Liu Bao	劉保	16 December 125 AD	20 September 144 AD	Emperor Xiaoshun	孝順皇帝	Jingzong	敬宗	Yonghe	永和	136–141 AD
Emperor Shun	Liu Bao	劉保	16 December 125 AD	20 September 144 AD	Emperor Xiaoshun	孝順皇帝	Jingzong	敬宗	Han'an	漢安	142–144 AD
Emperor Shun	Liu Bao	劉保	16 December 125 AD	20 September 144 AD	Emperor Xiaoshun	孝順皇帝	Jingzong	敬宗	Jiankang	建康	144 AD
Emperor Chong	Liu Bing	劉炳	20 September 144 AD	15 February 145 AD	Emperor Xiaochong	孝沖皇帝	—N/a		Yongxi	永熹	145 AD
Emperor Zhi	Liu Zuan	劉纘	6 March 145 AD	26 July 146 AD	Emperor Xiaozhi	孝質皇帝	—N/a		Benchu	本初	146 AD
Emperor Huan	Liu Zhi	劉志	1 August 146 AD	25 January 168 AD	Emperor Xiaohuan	孝桓皇帝	Weizong	威宗	Jianhe	建和	147–149 AD
Emperor Huan	Liu Zhi	劉志	1 August 146 AD	25 January 168 AD	Emperor Xiaohuan	孝桓皇帝	Weizong	威宗	Heping	和平	150 AD
Emperor Huan	Liu Zhi	劉志	1 August 146 AD	25 January 168 AD	Emperor Xiaohuan	孝桓皇帝	Weizong	威宗	Yuanjia	元嘉	151–153 AD
Emperor Huan	Liu Zhi	劉志	1 August 146 AD	25 January 168 AD	Emperor Xiaohuan	孝桓皇帝	Weizong	威宗	Yongxing	永興	153–154 AD
Emperor Huan	Liu Zhi	劉志	1 August 146 AD	25 January 168 AD	Emperor Xiaohuan	孝桓皇帝	Weizong	威宗	Yongshou	永壽	155–158 AD
Emperor Huan	Liu Zhi	劉志	1 August 146 AD	25 January 168 AD	Emperor Xiaohuan	孝桓皇帝	Weizong	威宗	Yanxi	延熹	158–167 AD
Emperor Huan	Liu Zhi	劉志	1 August 146 AD	25 January 168 AD	Emperor Xiaohuan	孝桓皇帝	Weizong	威宗	Yongkang	永康	167 AD
Emperor Ling	Liu Hong	劉宏	17 February 168 AD	13 May 189 AD	Emperor Xiaoling	孝靈皇帝	—N/a		Jianning	建寧	168–172 AD
Emperor Ling	Liu Hong	劉宏	17 February 168 AD	13 May 189 AD	Emperor Xiaoling	孝靈皇帝	—N/a		Xiping	熹平	172–178 AD
Emperor Ling	Liu Hong	劉宏	17 February 168 AD	13 May 189 AD	Emperor Xiaoling	孝靈皇帝	—N/a		Guanghe	光和	178–184 AD
Emperor Ling	Liu Hong	劉宏	17 February 168 AD	13 May 189 AD	Emperor Xiaoling	孝靈皇帝	—N/a		Zhongping	中平	184–189 AD
Emperor Shao	Liu Bian	劉辯	15 May 189 AD	28 September 189 AD	King Huai of Hongnong	少皇帝	—N/a		Guangxi	光熹	189 AD
Emperor Shao	Liu Bian	劉辯	15 May 189 AD	28 September 189 AD	King Huai of Hongnong	少皇帝	—N/a		Zhaoning	昭寧	189 AD
Emperor Xian	Liu Xie	劉協	28 September 189 AD	11 December 220 AD	Emperor Xiaoxian	孝獻皇帝	—N/a		Yonghan	永漢	189 AD
Emperor Xian	Liu Xie	劉協	28 September 189 AD	11 December 220 AD	Emperor Xiaoxian	孝獻皇帝	—N/a		Chuping	初平	190–193 AD
Emperor Xian	Liu Xie	劉協	28 September 189 AD	11 December 220 AD	Emperor Xiaoxian	孝獻皇帝	—N/a		Xingping	興平	194–195 AD
Emperor Xian	Liu Xie	劉協	28 September 189 AD	11 December 220 AD	Emperor Xiaoxian	孝獻皇帝	—N/a		Jian'an	建安	196–220 AD
Emperor Xian	Liu Xie	劉協	28 September 189 AD	11 December 220 AD	Emperor Xiaoxian	孝獻皇帝	—N/a		Yankang	延康	220 AD

== Timeline ==
=== Legend ===
- Orange denotes Western Han monarchs
- Teal denotes Han monarchs following the collapse of the Xin dynasty but prior to the Eastern Han
- Pink denotes Eastern Han monarchs

== See also ==
- Dynasties in Chinese history
- List of Chinese monarchs
