= Huo Chengjun =

Empress of China from 70 to 66 BC

Huo Chengjun 霍成君
- Empress of the Han dynasty (70 - 66 B.C.)

Empress of the Western Han dynasty
- Reign: 17 April 70 - 17 September 66 BC
- Predecessor: Empress Xu
- Successor: Empress Wang
- Died: 54 BC; Chang'an, Han China
- Cause of death: Suicide
- Spouse: Emperor Xuan of Han
- Clan: Huo (霍) (by birth); Liu (劉) (by marriage)
- Dynasty: Han Dynasty
- Father: Huo Guang (霍光), Marquis of Bolu
- Mother: Lady Xian (顯氏)

Huo Chengjun (Chinese: 霍成君) (died 54 BC) was an empress of the Chinese Western Han dynasty. She was the second wife of Emperor Xuan. Her father was the statesman Huo Guang, who served as regent for Emperor Zhao and who remained exceedingly powerful during Emperor Xuan's reign until his death in April 68 BC. Her mother's surname was Xian (顯).

== Family background ==
It is not known when Chengjun was born to Huo Guang and Lady Xian. What is known is that she grew up in a household with such great power that in many ways, it regarded itself and was regarded as the real imperial household. She became accustomed to luxury living when she was young, and part of that was manifested in her customs of rewarding her servants with great wealth. She had an older sister who married Shangguan An, a son of Shangguan Jie; their daughter became Emperor Zhao's wife, Empress Xiaozhao.

== Marriage ==
In 74 BC, Emperor Zhao died at age 20. Huo initially selected his nephew, Prince He of Changyi as the new emperor. However, after Prince He quickly showed his unsuitability to be an emperor, Huo removed him from the throne and selected a commoner, the great-grandson of Emperor Wu and grandnephew of Emperor Zhao, Liu Bingyi (劉病已), to be emperor, and he accepted the throne as Emperor Xuan.

Emperor Xuan was already married to Xu Pingjun when he accepted the throne, and he created Xu an imperial consort. When it came time to create an empress, the officials, knowing that it was Lady Xian's wishes, largely wanted Emperor Xuan to marry Huo Chengjun and create her empress. Emperor Xuan did not explicitly reject this proposal, but issued an order to seek out the sword that he owned as a commoner. Getting the hint, the officials recommended Consort Xu as empress, and she was created as such late in 74 BC.

Lady Xian would not be denied what she wanted—having her daughter as an empress. In 71 BC, Empress Xu was pregnant when Lady Xian came up with a plot. She bribed Empress Xu's female physician Chun Yuyan (淳于衍), under guise of giving Empress Xu medicine after she gave birth, to poison her. Chunyu did so, and Empress Xu died shortly after she gave birth. Her doctors were initially arrested to investigate whether they cared for the empress properly. Lady Xian, alarmed, informed Huo Guang what had actually happened, and Huo, not having the heart to turn in his wife, instead signed Chunyu's release.

On 17 April 70 BC, Emperor Xuan created Huo Chengjun empress. Accustomed to luxury living, her palace expenditures far exceeded the late Empress Xu. She tried to maintain a good relationship with her niece, Grand Empress Dowager Shangguan, but their relationship appeared to be not as cordial as Grand Empress Dowager Shangguan's relationship with the late Empress Xu, because Grand Empress Dowager Shangguan was intimidated by Empress Huo's status as her aunt.

== Removal and death ==
In April 68 BC, Huo Guang died. Emperor Xuan and Grand Empress Dowager Shangguan made the nearly-unprecedented act of personally attending Huo's wake and built an impressive mausoleum for Huo. After Huo's death, Emperor Xuan assumed far more personal powers than he had during Huo's lifetime. Empress Huo's brother Huo Yu (霍禹), nephews Huo Yun (霍雲) and Huo Shan (霍山), and brothers-in-law Fan Mingyou (范明友) and Deng Guanghan (鄧廣漢) remained in key posts, however.

In May 67 BC, Emperor Xuan created Prince Shi—the late Empress Xu's son—crown prince, and created Empress Xu's father Xu Guanghan (許廣漢) the Marquess of Ping'en—an action that Huo Guang had opposed. Lady Xian was shocked and displeased, because if her daughter were to have a son later, that son could only be a prince and not the future emperor. She instructed Empress Huo to murder the crown prince. Allegedly, Empress Huo did make multiple attempts to do so, but failed each time. Around this time, the emperor also heard rumors that the Huos had murdered Empress Xu, which led him to begin stripping the Huos of actual power, while giving them impressive titles.

In 66 BC, after there had been increasing public rumors that the Huos had murdered Empress Xu, Lady Xian finally revealed to her son and grandnephews that she had, indeed, murdered Empress Xu. In fear of what the emperor might do if he had actual proof, Lady Xian, her son, her grandnephews, and her sons-in-law formed a conspiracy to depose the emperor. The conspiracy was discovered, and the entire Huo clan was executed by Emperor Xuan.

Emperor Xuan then issued an edict deposing Empress Huo on 17 September, in which he made no reference to what her family allegedly did but accused her of trying to poison Crown Prince Shi. She was kept in an unused palace. In 54 BC, he was set to exile her to another even more distant palace, and she committed suicide.

Chinese royalty
Preceded by Empress Xu Pingjun	Empress of Western Han Dynasty; 17 Apr 70 – 17 Sep 66 BC	Succeeded by Empress Wang
