= Xu Pingjun =

Empress of China from 74 to 71 BC

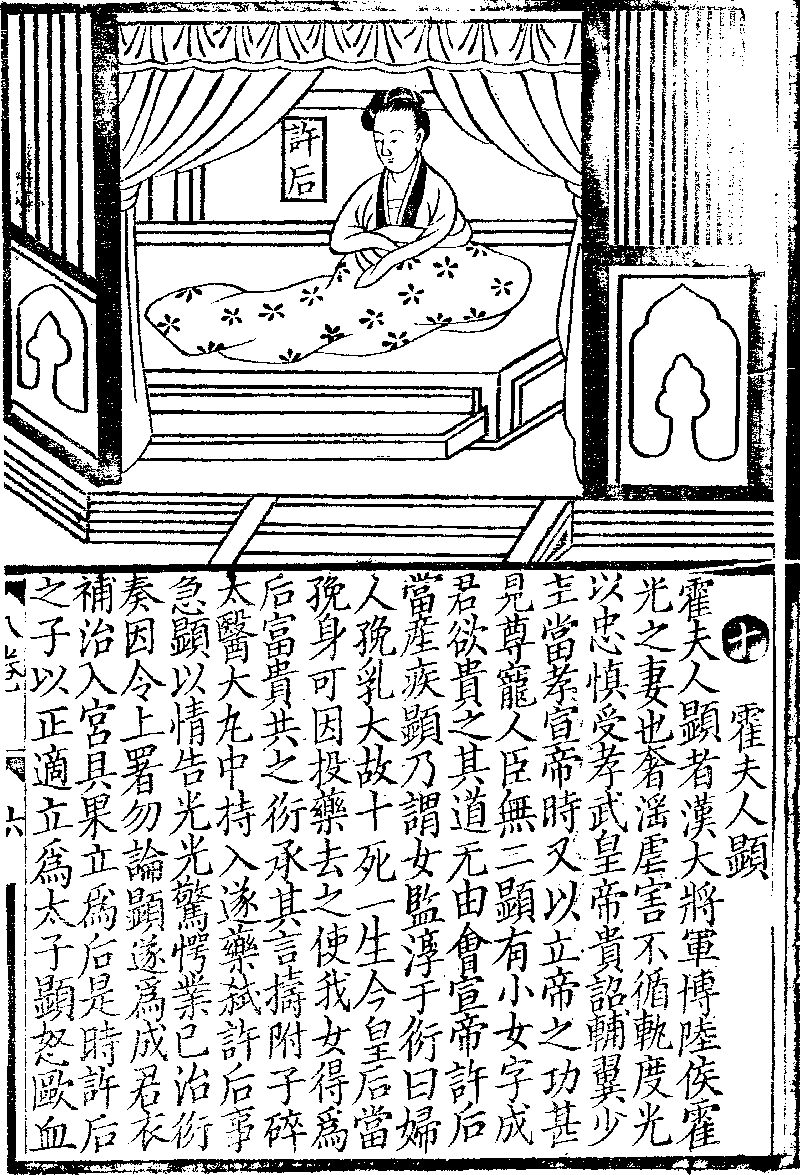

Empress of the Han dynasty
- Tenure: 10 September 74 BC – 1 March 71 BC
- Predecessor: Empress Shangguan
- Successor: Empress Huo
- Born: 89 BC Changyi County, Shanyang Commandery (modern day Jinxiang County, Shandong)
- Died: 1 March 71 BC (aged 18) Chang'an (modern day Xi'an, Shaanxi)
- Spouse: Emperor Xuan of Han
- Issue: Emperor Yuan of Han
Posthumous name
- Empress Gongai (恭哀皇后)
- Father: Xu Guanghan, Marquis Dai of Pingen

Xu Pingjun (Chinese: 許平君) (89? BC – 1 March 71 BC), formally Empress Gong'ai (恭哀皇后; lit. ''the respectful and lamentable empress''), was an empress of the Chinese Western Han dynasty as the first wife of Emperor Xuan. She was murdered by poisoning by Huo Guang's wife Lady Xian (顯氏). She was also the mother of Emperor Yuan.

== Family background ==
Xu Pingjun was born into a family that had some minor privileges but had also suffered under the reign of Emperor Wu. It is not known exactly when she was born, but probably circa 89 BC. Her father Xu Guanghan (許廣漢) was an assistant to the Prince of Changyi when young, and later became an imperial attendant. Later, while accompanying Emperor Wu on a trip, he accidentally took the saddle of another attendant and was charged with theft; his sentence was castration. After castration, he became a eunuch at court, and served as a minor official.

== Marriage to then-commoner Liu Bingyi ==
Xu Pingjun's future husband Liu Bingyi was the only surviving descendant of Liu Ju, Emperor Wu's crown prince who was forced into a failed rebellion in 91 BC when he was still an infant. He was spared, but was made a commoner and, as an orphan, he had to survive on the largess of others, including his grandfather's old subordinate Zhang He (張賀), who was also castrated by Emperor Wu as punishment for having been Crown Prince Ju's subordinate, and who became a chief eunuch.

Around 76 BC, Zhang wanted to marry his granddaughter to Bingyi, but his brother Zhang Anshi (張安世), then an important official, opposed this, fearing that it would bring trouble. Zhang, instead, invited Xu Guanghan, a subordinate to him, to dinner and persuaded him to marry his daughter, Pingjun. When Xu's wife heard this, she became extremely angry and refused, but because Zhang was Xu's superior, Xu did not dare to renege on the promise, and Bingyi and Pingjun were married, in a ceremony entirely paid by Zhang (because Bingyi could not afford to). Zhang also paid the bride price. After their marriage, Bingyi depended on his wife's family for support. In 75 BC, Pingjun bore him a son, Liu Shi.

== As empress ==
In 75 BC, an unexpected development occurred. After the death of Bingyi's granduncle, Emperor Zhao, the regent Huo Guang, having been dissatisfied with his initial selection of the Prince of Changyi as the new Emperor, deposed Prince He and offered the throne to the commoner Bingyi instead. Bingyi accepted and took the throne as Emperor Xuan.

After her husband became emperor, Pingjun was initially created an imperial consort. When it came time to create an empress, the officials largely wanted Emperor Xuan to marry Huo Guang's daughter Huo Chengjun and create her empress. Emperor Xuan did not explicitly reject this proposal, but issued an order to seek out the sword that he owned as a commoner. Getting the hint, the officials recommended Consort Xu as empress, and she was created as such on 31 December 74 BC. He initially wanted to create his father-in-law Xu Guanghan a marquis, but Huo opposed this, reasoning a eunuch who had suffered castration as a punishment should not be made a marquis. Instead, Xu was given the title "Lord of Changcheng" (昌成君).

As empress, Empress Xu was known for her humility and thriftiness. She was also known for devotion to Empress Dowager Shangguan, often meeting her for meals.

== Death ==
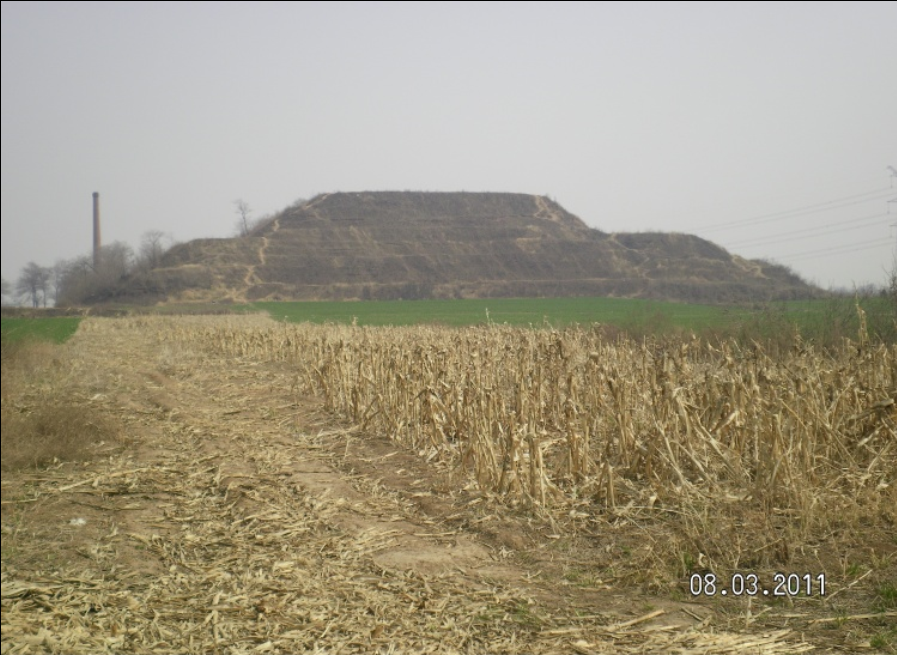
Tomb of Empress Xu south of Xi'an, Shaanxi

Huo Guang's wife, Lady Xian, would not be denied her wish of making her daughter an empress. In 71 BC, Empress Xu was pregnant when Lady Xian came up with a plot. She bribed Empress Xu's female physician Chunyu Yan (淳于衍), under guise of giving Empress Xu medicine after she gave birth, to poison her. Chunyu did so (with aconitum), and Empress Xu died shortly after she gave birth. Her doctors were initially arrested to investigate whether they cared for the empress properly. Lady Xian, alarmed, informed Huo Guang what had actually happened, and Huo, not having the heart to turn in his wife, instead signed Chunyu's release. It is not known what happened to Empress Xu's newborn child, but since Chinese historical sources at that time did not pay much attention to children who die young, presumably the child died early.

Empress Xu was buried with full imperial honours near, but not with, her husband, whose third wife Empress Wang was later buried with him. Her son Liu Shi would become crown prince and later Emperor Yuan after surviving attempts on his life by Empress Xu's successor, Empress Huo. The Huo clan would be destroyed in 66 BC.

Chinese royalty
Preceded by Empress Shangguan	Empress of the Western Han dynasty 31 Dec 74 – 1 Mar 71 BC	Succeeded by Empress Huo Chengjun
