= Empress Wang (Xuan) =

Empress of China from 64 to 48 BC

Empress of the Western Han dynasty
- Reign: 26 March 64 - 10 January 48 BC
- Predecessor: Empress Huo Chengjun
- Successor: Empress Wang Zhengjun

Empress Dowager of the Western Han dynasty
- Reign: January 48 - 8 July 33 B.C.
- Predecessor: Empress Dowager Shangguan
- Successor: Empress Dowager Wang

Grand Empress Dowager of the Western Han dynasty
- Reign: July 33 - 22 September 16 B.C.
- Predecessor: Grand Empress Dowager Shangguan
- Successor: Grand Empress Dowager Wang
- Died: 22 September 16 B.C.
- Spouse: Emperor Xuan
Posthumous name
- Empress Xiaoxuan (孝宣皇后)
- Clan: Wang (王) (by birth); Liu (劉) (by marriage)
- Dynasty: Han dynasty
- Father: Wang Fengguang

Empress Wang (王皇后, personal name unknown) (died 22 September 16 BC), formally Empress Xiaoxuan (孝宣皇后), semi-formally Empress Dowager Qiongcheng (邛成太后), to distinguish her from her daughter-in-law Wang Zhengjun, with the same family name, but otherwise unrelated to her) was an empress during the Western Han dynasty. She was the third wife of Emperor Xuan.

== Early life ==
Empress Wang's father Wang Fengguang (王奉光) was a hereditary acting marquess (關內侯) when he met Emperor Xuan while he was still a commoner, based on their common interest in cockfighting. According to legend, she was betrothed to several men in succession, but each time her fiancé died before marriage could occur. After Emperor Xuan became emperor, he took her as a concubine (as Consort Wang), but she was not one of his favourites.

Emperor Xuan's first wife, Empress Xu Pingjun was poisoned in 71 BC by the ambitious Xian (顯), the wife of the regent Huo Guang, who wanted to make her daughter Huo Chengjun empress, an objective that she was successful in after Empress Xu's death. While Huo Chengjun was empress, she allegedly tried unsuccessfully several times to poison Empress Xu's son Crown Prince Liu Shi, to make her potential future son the imperial heir.

== Empress ==
After the Huo clan was destroyed and Empress Huo deposed in 66 BC, Emperor Xuan considered who amongst his consorts to create as his empress. At that time, he favoured Consorts Hua, Zhang, and Wei, each of whom had borne him children. He almost settled on Consort Zhang as his new empress. However, he became hesitant, remembering how Empress Huo had tried to murder the crown prince. He therefore resolved to create as his empress someone who was childless and kind. He decided on Consort Wang, and created her empress on 26 March 64 BC and gave her a luxurious life. He also created her father, Wang Fengguang, the Marquess of Qiongcheng (邛成侯). Emperor Xuan put Prince Shi in her care, and she cared for him well. Despite her position, she was never one of Emperor Xuan's favourites and she rarely saw him. Of course, she had no problem with this and was satisfied with her power, which was superior to all wives, courtiers and even male relatives of the royal family.

Empress Wang would have a role in Crown Prince Shi's eventual choice of a wife. In the mid-50s BC, Consort Sima, the favourite consort of Prince Shi died from an illness. Prince Shi was grief-stricken and became ill and depressed. Emperor Xuan was concerned, so he had Empress Wang select the most beautiful of the young ladies in waiting and had them sent to Prince Shi. Wang Zhengjun was one of the ladies in waiting chosen. She, soon as the mother of his first-born son Liu Ao (later Emperor Cheng), would eventually become his wife and empress.

Empress Wang was not known to have had significant political influence as an empress.

== Empress dowager and grand empress dowager ==
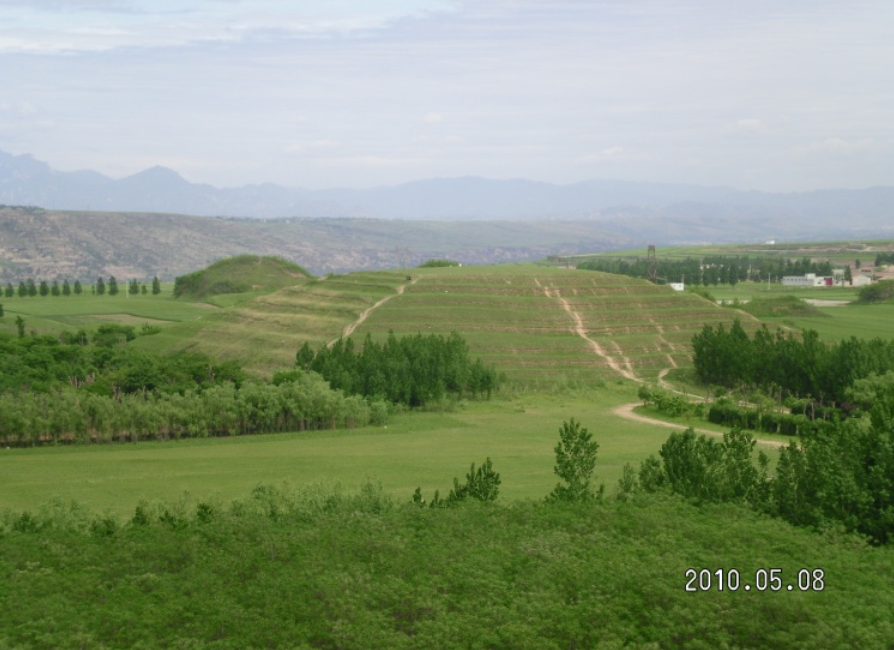
Tomb of Empress Wang in Xi'an, Shaanxi

After her husband Emperor Xuan died in January 48 BC and her stepson Prince Shi took the throne as Emperor Yuan, she held the title of empress dowager. She would outlive him as well.

After Emperor Yuan died in July 33 BC, his son, Crown Prince Ao, took the throne as Emperor Cheng. Empress Wang then held the title of grand empress dowager, and she became also semi-formally known as Empress Dowager Qiongcheng (based on her father's title) to be distinguished with her daughter-in-law. She did not appear to have much political influence during the reigns of either Emperor Yuan or Cheng, even though they appeared to genuinely love and respect her as a mother/grandmother.

She died in September 16 BC and was buried with her husband, Emperor Xuan according to tradition.

Chinese royalty
Preceded by Empress Huo Chengjun	Empress of the Western Han dynasty 26 Mar 64– Jan 48 BC	Succeeded by Empress Wang Zhengjun
