= Zhang Chang =

Zhang Chang may refer to:

- Zhang Chang (swimmer), swimmer who competed at the 2007 World Aquatics Championships
- Zhang Chang (Han dynasty), Han Dynasty official
- Zhang Chang (Jin dynasty), Jin dynasty rebel
