= Huo =

Huo (Chinese: 霍; pinyin: Huò; Jyutping: Fok3) is a Chinese surname. It is pronounced as Fok in Cantonese.

During the Zhou dynasty, King Wu awarded land to his brother Shuchu (叔處) in "Huo" (modern Huozhou, Shanxi), and Shuchu's descendants adopted "Huo" as their family name.

== Notable people ==
- Huo Qubing (霍去病; 140–117 BC), Western Han dynasty general, elder half-brother of Huo Guang
- Huo Guang (霍光; d. 68 BC), Huo Qubing's half-brother, Western Han dynasty statesman,younher half-brother of Huo Qubing, father of Huo Chenjun
- Huo Chengjun (霍成君; d. 54 BC), Huo Guang's daughter, Second empress consort of Emperor Xuan
- Huo Jun (霍峻; 177–216), Eastern Han dynasty general
- Huo Yi (霍弋), Huo Jun's son, Shu general of the Three Kingdoms period
- Huo Ji (霍冀; 1516–1575), Ming dynasty official
- Huo Yuanjia (霍元甲; 1868–1910), Qing dynasty martial artist
- Henry Fok Ying-tung (霍英東; Huo Yingdong; 1923–2006), Hong Kong businessman
- Timothy Fok Tsun-ting (霍震霆; Huo Zhenting; b. 1946), Henry Fok's eldest son, Hong Kong politician and entrepreneur
- Ian Fok Tsun-wan (霍震寰; Huo Zhenhuan; b. 1949), Henry Fok's second son, Hong Kong entrepreneur
- Canning Fok Kin-ning (霍建寧; Huo Jianning; b. 1951), Hong Kong entrepreneur
- Clarence Fok Yiu-leung (霍耀良; Huo Yaoliang; b. 1958), Hong Kong film director and producer
- Serge Huo-chao-si (霍 ??; Huo Chaosi; b. 1968), French Cartoonist
- Wallace Huo Chien-hwa (霍建華; Huo Jianhua; b. 1979), Taiwanese actor and singer
- Huo Siyan (霍思燕; b. 1981), actress
- Raulito Carbonell Huo (born c. 1950), Puerto Rican actor, comedian, singer and lawyer of Catalan and Chinese descent
- Henry Huo (霍尊; b. 1990), Chinese singer-composer
