= Shanyang Commandery =

Historic commandery of China

Shanyang Commandery (Chinese: 山陽郡) was a historical commandery in China, located in present-day southern Shandong province.

In the early Han dynasty, Shanyang was part of the Liang Kingdom. In 144 BC Liang was split into five kingdoms among the sons of King Xiao, with Liu Ding gaining Shanyang. Ding died in 136 BC, posthumously known as the King Ai (哀) of Shanyang, and the territory was converted into a commandery.

In 97 BC, Emperor Wu granted Shanyang to his son Liu Bo (劉髆) as the Changyi Kingdom (昌邑國). Bo ruled for 11 years and was known as the King Ai (哀) of Changyi. His successor Liu He was selected as the new Han emperor by regent Huo Guang in 74 BC, and the kingdom was converted to a commandery.

In 2 AD it administered 23 counties and marquessates, including Changyi (昌邑), Nanpingyang (南平陽), Chengwu (成武), Huling (湖陵), Dongniang (東嬢), Fangyu (方與), Tuo (橐), Juye (鉅野), Shanfu (單父), Bo (薄), Duguan (都關), Chengdu (城都), Huang (黃), Yuanqi (爰戚), Gaocheng (郜成), Zhongxiang (中鄉), Pingle (平樂), Zheng (鄭), Xiaqiu (瑕丘), Zixiang (甾鄉), Lixiang (栗鄉), Quxiang (曲鄉) and Xiyang (西陽). The total population was 801,288 individuals, or 172,847 households.

After the establishment of the Eastern Han dynasty, a number of counties and marquessates were merged. In 140 AD, the commandery administered 10 counties, namely Changyi, Dongmin (東緡), Juye, Gaoping (高平), Hulu (湖陆), Nanpingyang, Fangyu, Xiaqiu, Jinxiang (金鄉) and Fangdong (防東). The population was 606,091 individuals, or 109,898 households.

In Jin dynasty, Gaoping Principality (高平國) was established on the lands of Shanyang Commandery. The region became the Gaoping Commandery from Liu Song dynasty onwards.
