= Grand Empress Dowager Shangguan =

Empress of China from 83 to 74 BC

Grand Empress Dowager Shangguan 上官太皇太后

Empress of the Western Han dynasty
- Tenure: 24 April 83 BC –5 June 74 BC
- Predecessor: Empress Wei
- Successor: Empress Xu

Empress Dowager of the Han Dynasty
- Tenure: 18 July - 14 August 74 BC
- Predecessor: Empress Dowager Wang
- Successor: Empress Dowager Qiongcheng

Grand Empress Dowager of the Han Dynasty
- Tenure: 10 September 74 BC - 27 October 37 BC
- Predecessor: Grand Empress Dowager Dou
- Successor: Grand Empress Dowager Qiongcheng
- Born: 88 BC
- Died: 2 October 37 BC (aged 52)
- Spouse: Emperor Zhao of Han
Posthumous name
- Empress Xiaozhao (孝昭皇后)
- Father: Shangguan An
- Mother: Lady Huo

Grand Empress Dowager Shangguan (上官太皇太后) (personal name unknown) (88 BC – 2 October 37 BC), posthumously known as Empress Xiaozhao (孝昭皇后; lit. ''the filial and bright empress''), was the wife of Emperor Zhao of Han. She served as de facto regent during the interim period between the deposition of the Prince of Changyi until the succession of Emperor Xuan in 74 BC.

Her father was Shangguan An (上官安), a son of Shangguan Jie (上官桀). Her mother was the eldest daughter of Huo Guang. She was a key figure in a number of political incidents during the middle Han dynasty, and spent her entire adult life as a grand empress dowager and a widow without family. Both sides of her family were wiped out in two separate purges as punishment for being relatives of individuals accused of seeking to usurp the throne. She remains the youngest person in Chinese history to assume the titles of both empress dowager and grand empress dowager.

== Background and marriage to Emperor Zhao ==
Lady Shangguan's grandfathers, Huo Guang and Shangguan Jie (along with ethnic Xiongnu official Jin Midi), were co-regents for the young Emperor Zhao, who ascended the throne in 87 BC at age seven. Huo was the primary regent. At that time, Lady Shangguan herself was a toddler.

It is not known when Lady Shangguan's parents were married, but what is clear was that her grandfathers were colleagues in Emperor Wu's administration and great friends. However, after Jin, a moderating influence in the co-regency, died in 86 BC, they began to have conflicts, because Shangguan Jie was unhappy with his lesser role in the co-regency. In 84 BC, Shangguan Jie wanted to marry the four-year-old Lady Shangguan to the emperor. Huo initially refused, believing her to be too young. Shangguan Jie turned elsewhere for support of his plan. Lady Shangguan's father Shangguan An was a friend of Emperor Zhao's sister, Princess Eyi's and her lover, Ding Wairen (丁外人). He encouraged Ding to persuade the princess on the soundness of the marriage. He argued that the Shangguans' power would be firmer with the marriage, and that they could then help Ding legitimize his relationship with Princess Eyi. Princess Eyi agreed, and later in 84 BC the young Lady Shangguan was created an imperial consort (with the rank of jieyu). On 24 April 83 BC, she was created empress.

== As empress ==
Because of her young age (and her husband's young age as well), it was unlikely that Empress Shangguan had significant power at court after they were married. In 80 BC, however, she would suffer the first major tragedy in her life, the destruction of her paternal clan, the Shangguans.

The Shangguans, to show their appreciation to Ding for his role in facilitating the marriage between Empress Shangguan and Emperor Zhao, wanted to have him created a marquess, but this request was rebuffed by Huo, as were their subsequent efforts to have Ding made an important official. This caused Princess Eyi to resent Huos' power and influence. The Shangguans, Princess Eyi, Prince Dan of Yan, and Vice Prime Minister Sang Hongyang (桑弘羊) (who was resentful that his monopoly system, which he felt to be the key to sound finances for the state, was being dismantled), formed an anti-Huo conspiracy. In 80 BC, Prince Dan sent a report to Emperor Zhao, accusing Huo of improperly exercising imperial authority. The conspirators' plan was that as soon as Emperor Zhao authorised an investigation, Shangguan Jie and Sang would arrest and immediately execute Huo. However, after the report was given to Emperor Zhao, the 14-year-old Emperor Zhao took no action on it. The next day, he summoned Huo to the palace and exonerated him, reasoning that the actions that Huo was accused of had happened so recently that Prince Dan, a long distance away, could not have possibly known them, and therefore the report must have been false. At this point, the anti-Huo conspiracy was not discovered, but everyone was impressed with the wisdom shown by the young emperor.

Later that year, the conspirators tried again. Their plan was for Princess Eyi to invite Huo to a feast, and then to ambush Huo and kill him. They would then depose Emperor Zhao and make Prince Dan emperor. (However, allegedly, the Shangguans conspired to have Prince Dan killed once he arrived in the capital and for Shangguan Jie to declare himself emperor.) The conspiracy was revealed by a servant of Princess Eyi, and the conspirators were arrested and executed along with their entire clans. Princess Eyi and Prince Dan committed suicide. Empress Shangguan was spared, however, because of her young age and her status as Huo's granddaughter.

In 74 BC, Emperor Zhao died at age 20. Empress Shangguan, then 15, became a widow and would be for the rest of her life. The young couple was childless, and Emperor Zhao did not have any other concubines who had children either. (It is not clear whether the marriage was ever consummated, although it was likely given the tendency for early marriage and childbirth in those days, even for imperial couples.)

=== Role in the subsequent succession crisis ===
Empress Shangguan's grandfather Huo rejected Liu Xu (劉胥), the Prince of Guangling and the only surviving son of Emperor Wu, from the succession, because Emperor Wu himself had not favoured Prince Xu, who was known for being impulsive in his actions. He therefore turned to Prince He of Changyi, one of Emperor Wu's grandsons. It is unclear how aware Empress Shangguan was of her grandfather's actions, however some scholars see her as an active participant. When Prince He ascended the throne, Empress Shangguan became empress dowager.

== Brief reign of Prince He of Changyi ==
Once he became emperor, Prince He immediately began to give unlimited promotions to his subordinates from Changyi. He also failed to observe the period of mourning properly, but rather feasted day and night and went out on tours. Prince He's behaviour as emperor surprised and disappointed Huo, who pondered his options. At the suggestion of the Agriculture Minister, Tian Yannian (田延年), he began to consider deposing the new emperor. After consulting with other officials, Huo took action.

Huo and the other officials summoned a meeting of high level officials and announced the plan to depose the emperor, forcing the other officials to go along with the plan on pain of death. As a group, they went to Empress Dowager Shangguan's palace to report to her Prince He's offences. She agreed with their plan, and immediately ordered that Prince He's Changyi subordinates be barred from the palace, and those subordinates (some 200) were then arrested by Zhang. She then summoned Prince He, who still did not know what was going to happen. He only knew something was wrong when he saw Empress Dowager Shangguan seated on her throne and wearing a formal dress made of jewels, and the officials lined up next to her.

Huo and the top officials then offered their articles of impeachment against Prince He, and these articles were read out aloud to the Empress Dowager who verbally rebuked Prince He. The articles of impeachment listed as the main offences that Prince He committed as emperor:

- Refusal to abstain from meat and sex during the period of mourning
- Failure to keep the imperial seal secure
- Improperly promoting and rewarding his Changyi subordinates during the period of mourning
- Engaging in feasts and games during the period of mourning
- Offering sacrifices to his father during the period of mourning for his uncle

Empress Dowager Shangguan approved the articles of impeachment and ordered Prince He deposed.

=== Regency and ascension of Emperor Xuan ===
For nearly a month (although initially it appeared that the period might last even longer) Empress Dowager Shangguan heard reports and ruled on all important matters of state. It was during this time that she began to learn the Confucian classics from Xiahou Sheng (夏侯勝).

After Prince He was removed as emperor, Huo Guang made a second search for a suitable successor to the throne. At some point, on the recommendation of Bing Ji (丙吉), Huo reached out to a commoner, a grandson of former Crown Prince Liu Ju; he was the son of Emperor Wu and Empress Wei Zifu who committed suicide in September 91 BC after being forced into an unsuccessful rebellion against his father. Liu Ju was Empress Shangguan's grand nephew.

Huo then formally submitted the proposal to Empress Dowager Shangguan, who approved it. To avoid having a mere commoner ascend the throne, she first created him the Marquess of Yangwu, and on the same day, he ascended the throne as Emperor Xuan. Empress Dowager Shangguan was given the title of Grand Empress Dowager, the title she would hold the rest of her life.

== As grand empress dowager ==
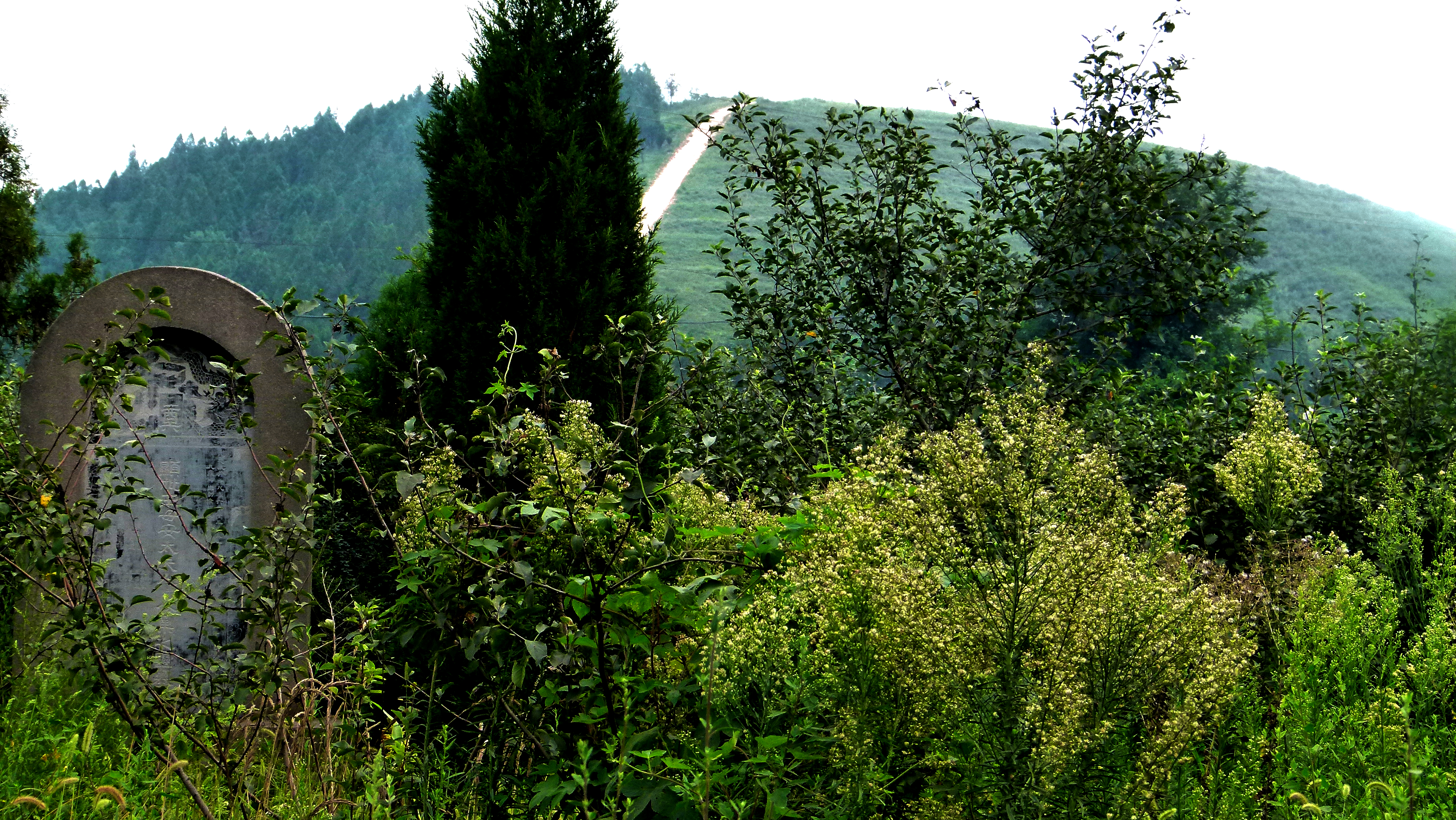
Tomb of Empress Shangguan in Pingling (平陵), Xianyang, Shaanxi

After Emperor Xuan became emperor, Grand Empress Dowager Shangguan, still a teenager, faded from the public eye. Nevertheless, she would often receive her Huo relations as guests, and Emperor Xuan's empress, Xu Pingjun, often had meals with her. She and Empress Xu appeared to have had a cordial relationship, and she was in all likelihood not involved in the plot of her grandmother Xian (顯), who poisoned Empress Xu in 71 BC to allow Xian's daughter (and Grand Empress Dowager Shangguan's aunt) Huo Chengjun to become empress. Grand Empress Dowager Shangguan's relationship with her aunt and empress appeared to be cooler than her relationship with Empress Xu.

Huo Guang died in 68 BC. After Huo's death, his sons, sons-in-law and grandnephews remained in important posts and were made marquesses. The Huo family lived luxurious lives and acted as if it were the imperial household. Emperor Xuan, unhappy about the Huos' arrogance, began to gradually strip their actual powers while formally letting them keep their titles.

In 67 BC, Emperor Xuan made his son Liu Shi (劉奭, later Emperor Yuan), by the deceased Empress Xu, crown prince, an act that greatly angered Lady Xian, who instructed her daughter to murder the crown prince. Allegedly, Empress Huo did make multiple attempts to do so, but failed each time. Around this time, the emperor also heard rumours that the Huos had murdered Empress Xu, which led him to strip the Huos of actual power.

In 66 BC, Lady Xian revealed to her son and grandnephews that she had, indeed, murdered Empress Xu. In fear of what the emperor might do if he had actual proof, Lady Xian, her son, her grandnephews, and her sons-in-law formed a conspiracy to depose the emperor. Their plan was to ask Grand Empress Dowager Shangguan to invite Emperor Xuan's grandmother, Lady Wang, Prime Minister Wei Xiang (魏相) and Empress Xu's father-in-law and the deceased Empress Xu's father Xu Guanghan (許廣漢), planning to ambush them and kill them (whom the Huos considered political rivals), and then depose Emperor Xuan and make Huo's son Huo Yu (霍禹) emperor. The plot was discovered and the entire Huo clan was executed, leaving Grand Empress Dowager Shangguan, who apparently was not involved in the plot, entirely without family.

The only reference to Grand Empress Dowager Shangguan after that was that she greatly honoured her teacher Xiahou by wearing mourning clothes for him when he died. She died in 37 BC, during the reign of Emperor Xuan's son Emperor Yuan, and she was buried with her husband Emperor Zhao.

== Family ==
- Father: Shangguan An, Marquess of Sangle
  - Grandfather: Shangguan Jie, Marquess of Anyang
- Mother: Lady Huo
  - Grandfather: Huo Guang, Marquess Xuancheng of Bolu
    - Aunt: Empress Huo Chengjun
- Husband: Emperor Zhao of Han - No issue.
  - Father-in-law: Emperor Wu of Han
  - Mother-in-law: Consort Zhao

== Titles ==
- During the reign of Emperor Wu (r. 141 - 87 BC)
  - Lady Shangguan (上官氏; from 88 BC)
- During the reign of Emperor Zhao (r. 87 - 74 BC)
  - Lady of Handsome Fairness (婕妤; from 84 BC)
  - Empress (皇后; from 24 April 83 BC)
- During the reign of Prince He of Changyi (r. 74 BC)
  - Empress Dowager (皇太后; from 18 July 74 BC)
- During the reign of Emperor Xuan (r. 74 - 48 BC)
  - Grand Empress Dowager (太皇太后; from 10 September 74 BC)
- During the reign of Emperor Yuan (r. 48 - 33 BC)
  - Empress Xiaozhao (孝昭皇后; from 2 October 37 BC)

Chinese royalty
Preceded by Empress Wei Zifu	Empress of Western Han dynasty 24 Apr 83– Jun 74 BC	Succeeded by Empress Xu Pingjun
