= Shangguan Jie =

Chinese Western Han official (died 80 BCE)

Shangguan Jie (Chinese: 上官桀; died c.November 80 BC) was a Western Han dynasty official in China and consort kin who served under Emperors Wu and Zhao. His granddaughter later became the empress consort to Emperor Zhao.

== Biography ==
Shangguan Jie first rose in prominence when he accompanied Li Guangli during the Han invasion of Osh. Due to his bravery, he received several promotions. However, this Shangguan Jie should be another person who have the exact same name.

In 87 B.C., as Emperor Wu was nearing death, Shangguan was made one of 4 officials assisting Wu's successor, the young Liu Fuling (who would ascend the throne as Emperor Zhao; the other 3 are Huo Guang, Jin Midi, and Sang Hongyang). Shangguan Jie's son Shangguan An married a daughter of Huo Guang; Shangguan An's daughter would later become Emperor Zhao's empress. However, the cordial relationship between Shangguan Jie and Huo Guang would not last, presumably due to Shangguan's jealousy of Huo's power being greater than his own. In 80 B.C., the Shangguan clan, along with Sang Hongyang, was implicated in an attempted rebellion, and exterminated.

Due to his crime of treason, his biography was not included in the Book of Han; details on him were instead found in the biographies of his granddaughter and Li Guangli.
