= Zhang Chang (Han dynasty) =

Han dynasty scholar (died 48 BC)

Zhang Chang (Chinese: 張敞; pinyin: Zhāng Chǎng; died 48 BC), courtesy name Zigao (子高), was a Han dynasty scholar and official who flourished in the reign of Emperor Xuan of Han.

He first attracted attention by denouncing the irregular conduct of Prince He of Changyi, who was promptly disgraced upon his representations. He became Governor of Shanyang in Shandong, and successfully coped with the brigandage and rebellious spirit which prevailed. In 61 BC he was promoted to be Governor of the Metropolitan District. In this capacity he took part in all the councils of State; and his advice, based upon his wide knowledge of history, was always received with deference. In every way he ruled wisely and well; and it was said that, owing to his vigilance, "the alarm drum was not struck for nine years." He then became mixed up in the affair of Yang Yun (a grandson of Sima Qian), and was dismissed from office. Whereupon there was such an increase of seditious manifestations throughout Jizhou (冀) in Zhili, that the Emperor appointed him governor of that district, and the disturbances came at once to an end. He died just as the Emperor Yuandi was about to bestow upon him further honours. He was especially famous for his acquaintance with the early forms of Chinese characters, and for his profound knowledge of the Spring and Autumn Annals.

He made a practice of painting his wife's eyebrows; and when the Emperor enquired him on the point, he replied that this was a matter of the highest importance to women.
