= Sang Hongyang =

Chinese politician (died 80 BC)

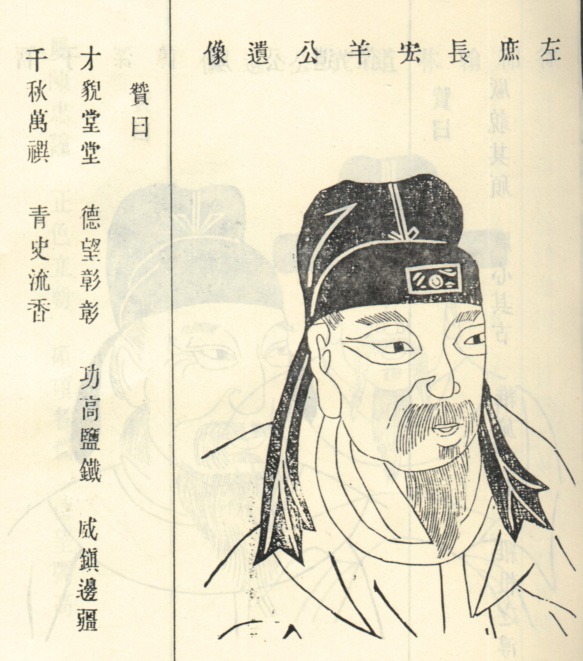
- 19th or early 20th-century depiction of Sang Hongyang
- Chinese: 桑弘羊
Transcriptions
Standard Mandarin
- Hanyu Pinyin: Sāng Hóngyáng
- Wade–Giles: Sang Hung-yang

Sang Hongyang (c. 152 (Note: This birth year was based on the assumption that Sang became Palace Attendant to Emperor Wu in 140 BC. In the Discourses on Salt and Iron, Sang claimed that since he joined the imperial court when he was 13 (by East Asian reckoning), he had received rewards from the court for over 60 years.) – October or November 80 BC) (Note: 9th month of the 1st year of the Yuanfeng era, corresponding to 20 October to 18 November 80 BC in the proleptic Julian calendar.) was a prominent official of the Han dynasty, who served Emperor Wu of Han and his successor Emperor Zhao. He is famous for his economic policies during the reign of Emperor Wu, the best known of which include the state monopolies over iron and salt—systems which would be imitated by other dynasties throughout Chinese history. A participant in the debate of Salt and Iron of 81 BC, Sang was executed in 80 BC by the regent Huo Guang on charges of treason.

== Youth and officialdom ==
Sang Hongyang was born in Luoyang, one of the Han dynasty's major commercial centres, to a family of merchants. In his youth, he was known for his mathematical prowess. When Emperor Wu ascended to the throne in 141 BC, Sang came to his notice and was eventually invited to become Palace Attendant at the age of 13 (by East Asian reckoning). This was one way which the Emperor gained and retained talented individuals in the palace, and by which many important officials began their careers. Sang would remain Attendant for 26 years.

== Rise to fame ==
Sang's skill at economic policy would only come into play during the middle of Emperor Wu's reign. By then, the ongoing campaigns against the Xiongnu had drained the wealth built up by Emperor Wu's predecessors, and the state had entered a financial crisis. In 120 BC, the Minister of Agriculture, Zheng Dangshi (鄭當時), first proposed the idea of state monopolies on iron and salt, recommending two powerful salt and iron magnates to join the government and manage the industry on a national scale. Sang Hongyang was then assigned to aid the magnates in their planning. With the success of the monopolies in improving the empire's financial situation, Sang eventually rose to become Assistant Minister of Agriculture.

As the Assistant Minister, Sang soon implemented several more measures to refill the national coffers. These included an asset tax, payable by artisans, bankers, merchants, and owners of carriages and boats, which was calculated according to the amount of assets. Smallholders only needed to pay half the official rate of tax. At the same time, laws were enacted under which false reporting and concealment of assets was punishable by confiscation of assets and exile to the borders for a year. People were encouraged to report cases of concealment with half the confiscated assets being awarded to the reporters.

== Imperial secretary ==
In 87 BC, Sang Hongyang became the Imperial Secretary (also known as the Imperial Counsellor or Grandee Secretary), one of the three most senior posts in government known as the Three Excellencies. In the wake of the death of Emperor Wu and the installation of the child Emperor Zhao of Han in that year, Sang became one of the key politicians during the period of the triumvirate formed by Huo Guang, Jin Midi, and Shangguan Jie. However, Sang was executed in 80 BC by the regent Huo Guang on charges of treason for his alleged involvement in the attempted coup by Liu Dan (劉旦), King of Yan, aimed at taking over the throne of Han and having Huo Guang murdered. As a result, Sang's biography was not included in the Book of Han. (Note: Sang was mentioned several times in vol.30 of Shiji and part 2 of vol.24 of Han Shu; the Ping Zhun Shu (平准书) and Shi Huo Zhi (食货志) both described the economic system of the Western Han.)
