= Emperor Zhao of Han =

Emperor of the Han dynasty from 87 to 74 BC

Emperor Zhao of Han 漢昭帝
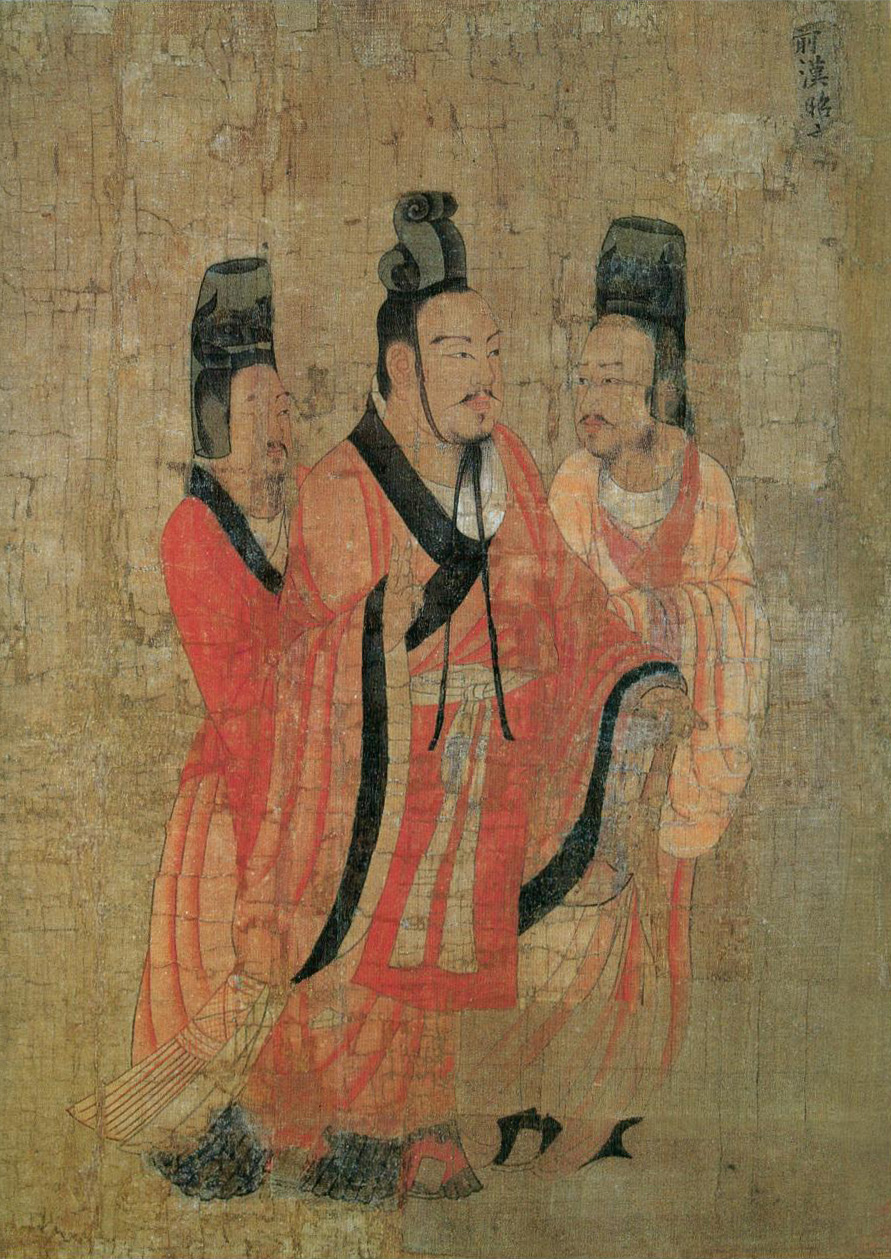
- Depiction of Emperor Zhao by Yan Liben, Tang dynasty

Emperor of the Han dynasty
- Reign: 30 March 87 BC – 5 June 74 BC
- Predecessor: Emperor Wu
- Successor: Liu He
- Born: Liu Fuling (劉弗陵); 94 BC; Chang'an, Han dynasty
- Died: 5 June 74 BC (aged 20); Chang'an, Han dynasty
- Burial: Ping Mausoleum (平陵)
- Spouse: Empress Xiaozhao
Names
- Liu Fuling (劉弗陵)
Era dates
- Shĭyúan 始元 (86–80 BC); Yúanfèng 元鳳 (80–75 BC); Yúanpíng 元平 (74 BC)
Posthumous name
- Short: Emperor Zhao (Chinese: 昭帝; pinyin: Zhāo Dì); Full: Emperor Xiaozhao (Chinese: 孝昭皇帝; pinyin: Xiàozhāo Huángdì)
Temple name
- Zhongzong (Chinese: 中宗; pinyin: Zhōngzōng)
- House: Liu
- Dynasty: Han (Western Han)
- Father: Emperor Wu
- Mother: Lady Zhao

Emperor Zhao of Han (Chinese: 漢昭帝; 94 – 5 June 74 BC), born Liu Fuling (劉弗陵), was the eighth emperor of the Han dynasty from 87 to 74 BC. Emperor Zhao was the youngest son of Emperor Wu.

By the time he was born, Emperor Wu was already 62. Prince Fuling ascended the throne after the death of Emperor Wu in 87 BC. He was only eight years old (by East Asian reckoning). Huo Guang served as regent.

Emperor Wu's long reign left the Han dynasty greatly expanded; however constant warfare had depleted the empire's coffers. Emperor Zhao, under the tutelage of Huo, took the initiative and lowered taxes as well as reducing government spending. As a result, citizens prospered and the Han dynasty enjoyed an era of peace. Emperor Zhao died after reigning for 13 years, at the age of 20. He was succeeded by Liu He, Prince of Changyi.

== Birth and childhood ==
In 94 BC, then Prince Fuling was born to a favourite concubine of Emperor Wu, Zhao Jieyu (趙婕妤), who carried the title Lady Gouyi. Emperor Wu was ecstatic in having a child at his advanced age (62), and because Consort Zhao purportedly had a pregnancy that lasted 14 months, the same length as the mythical Emperor Yao, he named Consort Zhao's palace gate "Gate of Yao's Mother." This led to speculation that the Emperor, in favouring Consort Zhao and Prince Fuling, wanted to make Prince Fuling crown prince instead of Crown Prince Liu Ju, the son of Empress Wei Zifu. That, in turn, led to conspiracies against Prince Ju and Empress Wei, eventually forcing Prince Ju to pre-emptively rise up in military self-defence in 91 BC. Being misunderstood as a revolt, Prince Ju was defeated and went into exile, and both he and Empress Wei committed suicide soon afterwards.

After Prince Ju's death, Emperor Wu was forced to consider who would make a good heir. Liu Dan, the Prince of Yan, was Emperor Wu's oldest surviving son, but Emperor Wu considered both he and his younger brother, Liu Xu, the Prince of Guangling, to be unsuitable, since neither respected the laws of the land. Liu Bo, Lady Li's son, had consort kin in the form of his uncle Li Guangli. In any case, before Emperor Wu's death, Li Guangli would surrender to the Xiongnu, while Liu Bo predeceased his father. Left with no other options, he decided on his youngest son, Prince Fuling, who was only six at that time. He therefore also chose a potential regent in Huo Guang, whom he considered to be capable and faithful. He also ordered Prince Fuling's mother, Lady Gouyi, arrested and executed, fearing that she would become an all-powerful and uncontrollable empress dowager, like Empress Dowager Lü. He entrusted Huo with the regency of Fuling. At Huo's suggestion, he also made ethnic Xiongnu official Jin Midi and general Shangguan Jie co-regents. He died on 29 March 87 BC, shortly after creating Prince Fuling crown prince two days earlier. Fuling then succeeded to the throne as Emperor Zhao at the age of 8.

== Early reign and marriage ==
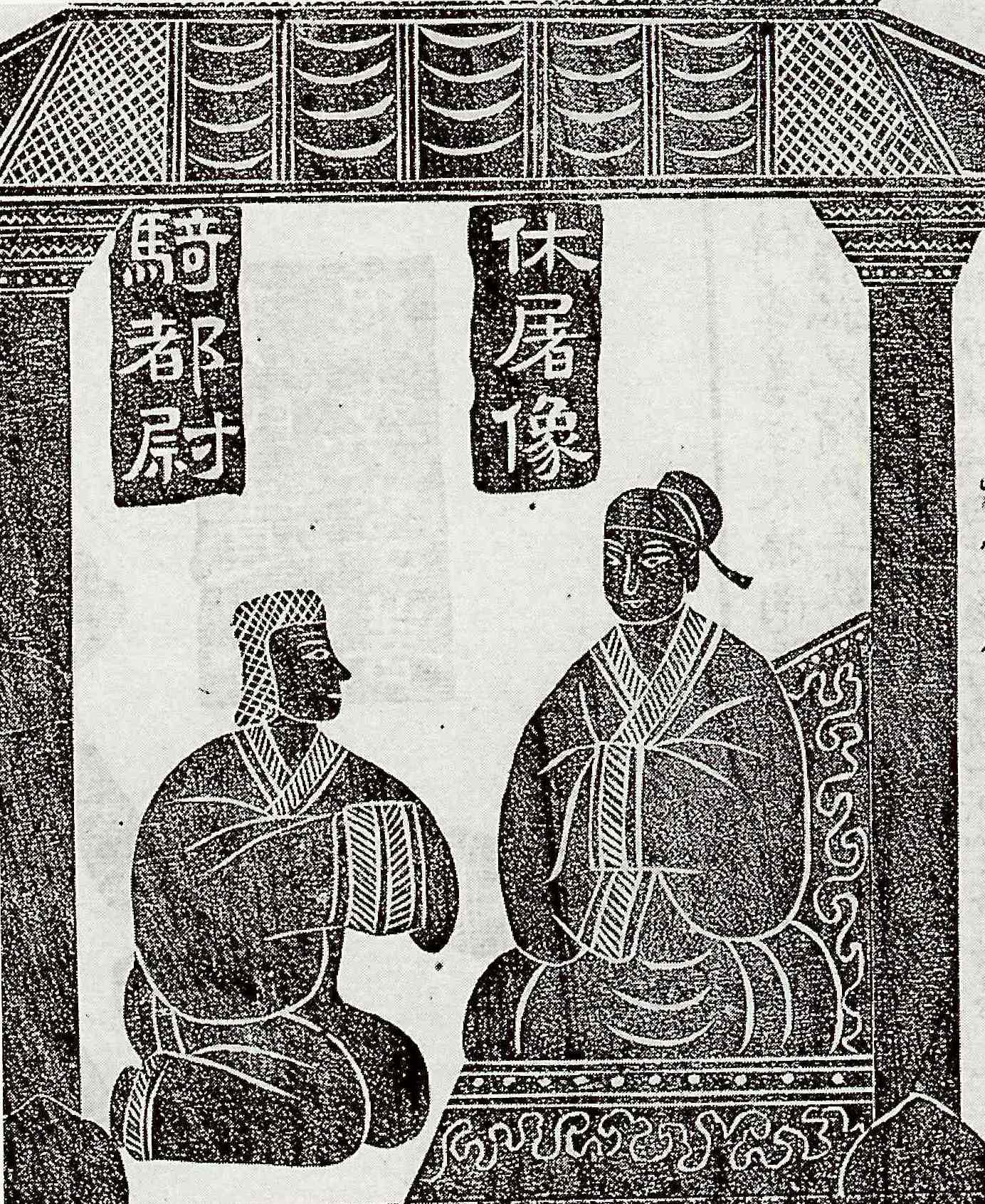
The story of Jin Midi. Wu Liang shrines, Jiaxiang, Shandong province, China. 2nd century AD. Ink rubbings of stone-carved reliefs as represented in Feng Yunpeng and Feng Yunyuan, Jinshi suo (1824 edition), n.p.

Early in Emperor Zhao's reign, Huo, Jin and Shangguan served as co-regents, with the key decisions being made by Huo. The palace was run by Princess Eyi, Emperor Wu's daughter and Emperor Zhao's older sister, who had moved back to the palace to serve as Emperor Zhao's caretaker.

Prince Dan of Yan was not happy about the turn in events that led to Emperor Zhao's ascension. In 86 BC, he secretly planned a rebellion, forming a conspiracy with two imperial clan members, Liu Zhang (劉長) and Liu Ze (劉澤). The plan was for them to accuse Emperor Zhao of being not actually Emperor Wu's son, and then for Liu Ze, a grandson of a former prince of Qi, to start a rebellion in Linzi (in modern Linzi District, Shandong), the former capital of the Principality of Qi, while Prince Dan would then start a rebellion from his Principality of Yan (roughly modern Beijing). The conspiracy was discovered, but Prince Dan was not punished, although the other conspirators were executed.

Later that year, Jin, a moderating influence in the co-regency, after being created a marquess on his sickbed, died. Huo and Shangguan were subsequently created marquesses as well. In the next few years, Shangguan, unhappy with his lesser role in the co-regency, tried to gain more power over Huo, even though the two had previously been great friends, and Huo had given his daughter in marriage to Shangguan's son Shangguan An (上官安). The young couple had a daughter, who was age five in 84 BC, when Shangguan Jie wanted to marry her to the emperor. Huo initially refused, believing her to be too young.

Shangguan Jie turned elsewhere for support of his plan. Shangguan An was a friend of Princess Eyi's lover, Ding Wairen (丁外人). He encouraged Ding to persuade the princess on the soundness of the marriage, reasoning that the Shangguans' power would be firmer with the marriage, and that they could then help Ding legitimize his relationship with Princess Eyi. Princess Eyi agreed, and later in 84 BC, the young Lady Shangguan was appointed as an imperial consort. In 83 BC, she was crowned empress.

== Middle reign and the struggle between Shangguan and Huo ==
In 82 BC, a man whose appearance was similar to the former Crown Prince Ju suddenly appeared at the palace, claiming that he was in fact Prince Ju and that he was there to claim the throne. He was arrested and shown to be an imposter named Cheng Fangsui (成方遂), and then executed.

Later that year, Shangguan An was created a marquess, and he became extremely arrogant and wild in his behaviour.

In the same year, at the suggestion of Du Yannian (杜延年), Huo started considering terminating some of the policies of Emperor Wu intended to raise revenues for the war efforts. In 81 BC, after a major debate between proponents (the chief among whom was vice prime minister Sang Hongyang) and opponents of the state monopolies on salt, iron, and wine, the wine and iron monopolies were abolished, once again allowing the merchants to benefit from the profits of these essentials. The people started to recover from the heavy burdens that Emperor Wu's wars had left on them.

In 80 BC, the ongoing conflict between Huo and Shangguan Jie came to a head. The Shangguans, wanting to reward Ding for his role in setting up the marriage between Empress Shangguan and Emperor Zhao, sought to have him created a marquess, but were rebuffed by Huo, as were their subsequent efforts to have Ding made an important official. This caused Princess Eyi to resent Huo as well. The Shangguans, Princess Eyi, Prince Dan of Yan, and Sang (who was resentful that his monopoly system, which he felt to be the key to sound finances for the state, was being dismantled), formed an anti-Huo conspiracy. In 80 BC, Prince Dan sent a report to Emperor Zhao, accusing Huo of improperly exercising imperial authority. The conspirators' plan was that as soon as Emperor Zhao authorised an investigation, Shangguan Jie and Sang would arrest and immediately execute Huo. However, after the report was given to Emperor Zhao, the 14-year-old Emperor Zhao took no action on it. The next day, he summoned Huo to the palace and exonerated him, reasoning that the actions that Huo was accused of had happened so recently that Prince Dan, a long distance away, could not have possibly known about them, and therefore the report must have been a forgery. At this point, the anti-Huo conspiracy was not discovered, but many were impressed at the wisdom of the young emperor.

Later that year, the conspirators tried again. Their plan was for Princess Eyi to invite Huo to a feast, and then to ambush Huo and kill him, and then depose Emperor Zhao and make Prince Dan emperor. (However, the Shangguans allegedly conspired to instead to have Prince Dan killed once he arrived in the capital, and for Shangguan Jie to declare himself emperor.) The conspiracy was revealed by a servant of Princess Eyi, and the conspirators were arrested and executed with their entire clans. Princess Eyi and Prince Dan committed suicide. Empress Shangguan was spared, however, because of her young age and her status as Huo's granddaughter.

== Late reign ==
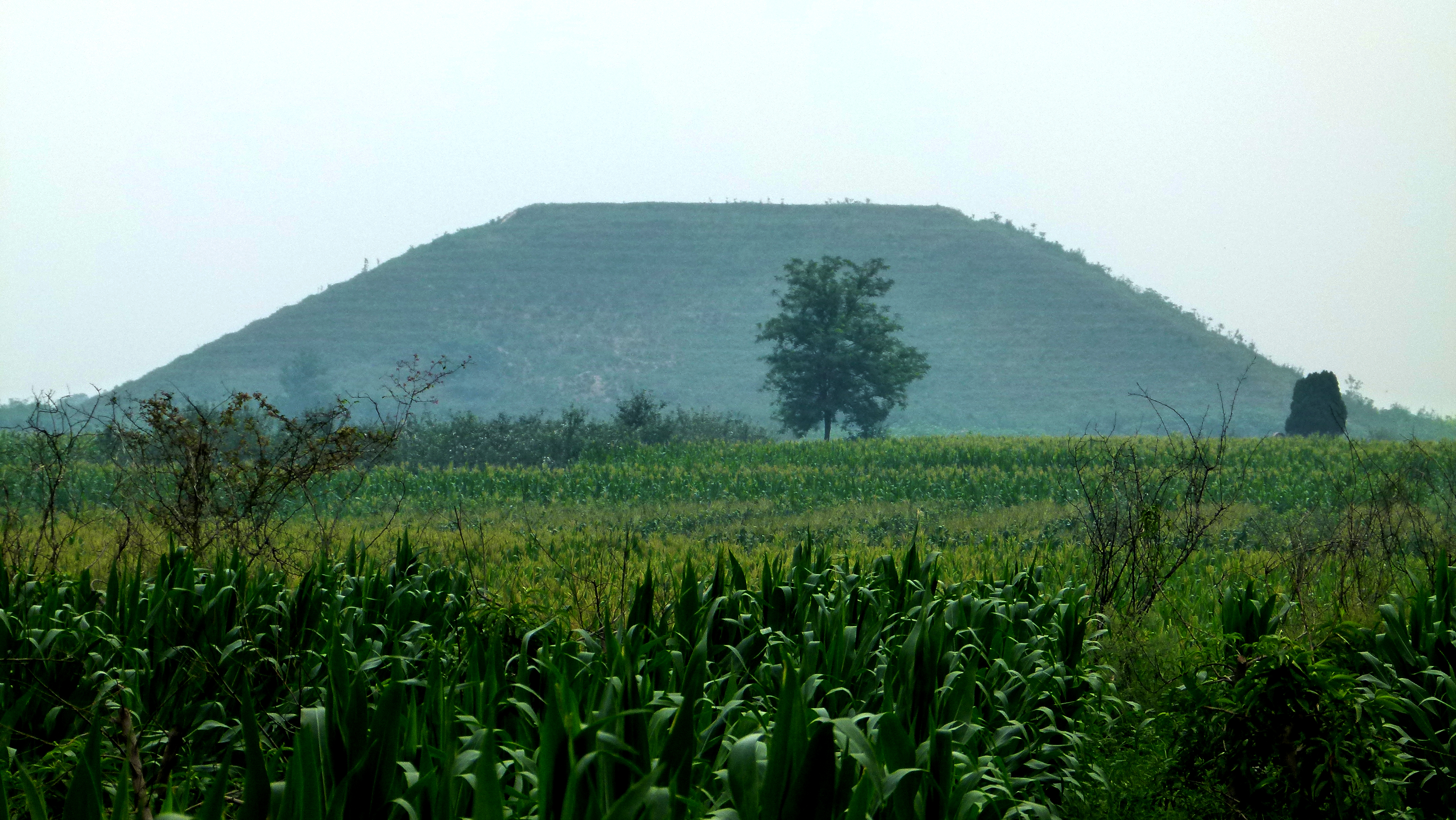
Pingling, tomb of Emperor Zhao, in Xianyang, Shaanxi

After the incident, Huo stamped out anyone who could be considered to be a conspirator, gaining a reputation for autocracy and heavy-handedness. The victims included two ministers, Wang Ping (王平) and Xu Ren (徐仁). The relationship between Huo and Emperor Zhao remained a positive one, however.

In 77 BC, a controversial incident involving the Xiyu (modern Xinjiang and former-Soviet central Asia) kingdom of Loulan (on northeastern edge of the Taklamakan Desert) would unfold itself, although whether Emperor Zhao played any role in the decision-making is unclear. A few years earlier, the King of Loulan had died, and with Xiongnu support, one of his sons, Angui (安歸) succeeded him, and Angui started a policy of befriending Xiongnu and resisting Han, particularly because Luolan's geographical location meant that it was often ordered by Han to escort its imperial messengers, who were also rude to Loulan officials. Huo sent an imperial messenger, Fu Jiezi (傅介子) to assassinate Angui. Fu accomplished this by claiming that he was there to reward Xiyu kings with jewels and other precious items, and then, setting a private meeting up with Angui, he stabbed him in the heart, and then, warning that any further action would bring a large Chinese army, he got the Loulan nobles to submit and make a brother of Angui, Weituqi (尉屠耆), who was friendly to Han, king. Loulan was renamed Shanshan.

In 74 BC, Emperor Zhao died without a son, and this would lead to a succession problem. After a short duration in which the unsuitable Prince He of Changyi became emperor, the throne was finally given to Emperor Zhao's grandnephew, former Crown Prince Ju's grandson, Liu Bingyi (劉病已), who would ascend the throne as Emperor Xuan.

== Era names ==
- Shiyuan (始元) 86 BC – 80 BC
- Yuanfeng (元鳳) 80 BC – 75 BC
- Yuanping (元平) 74 BC

== Consorts ==
- Empress Xiaozhao, of the Shangguan clan (孝昭皇后 上官氏; 89–37 BC)
- Feipin, of the Yang clan (妃嫔阳氏)

== See also ==
- Family tree of the Han dynasty

Emperor Zhao of Han House of Liu Born: 94 BC Died: 74 BC
Regnal titles
Preceded by Emperor Wu of Han	Emperor of China; Western Han; 87–74 BC with Huo Guang (87–74 BC); Jin Midi (87–86 BC); Shangguan Jie (87–80 BC)	Succeeded by Prince of Changyi
