= Marquis of Haihun =

Emperor of the Han dynasty in 74 BC

Marquis of Haihun 海昏侯
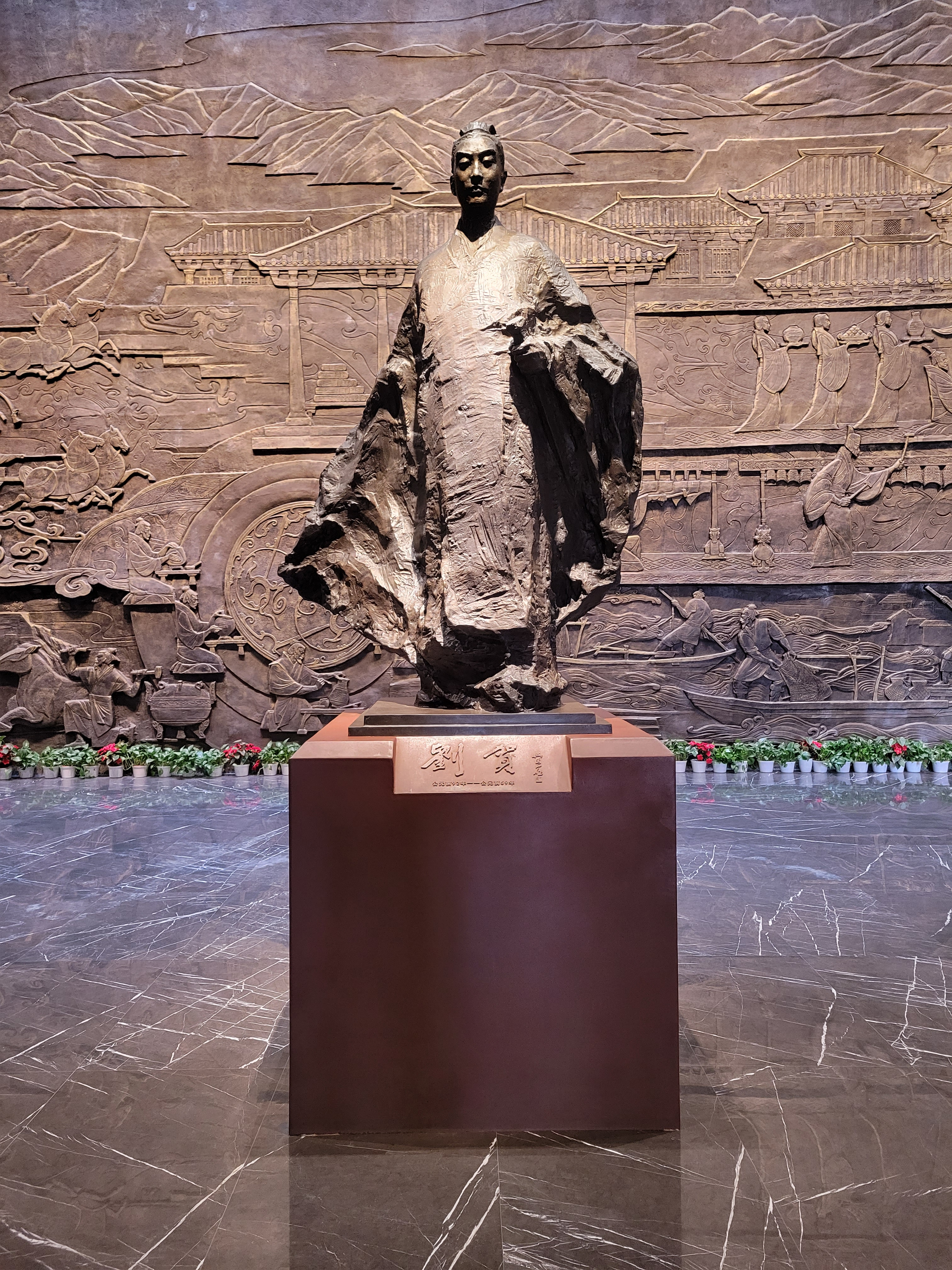
- Statue of Liu He at the Tomb of Marquis Haihun in Xinjian, Nanchang

Emperor of the Han dynasty
- Reign: 18 July – 14 August 74 BC
- Predecessor: Emperor Zhao
- Successor: Emperor Xuan

King of Changyi
- Reign: 88–74 BC
- Predecessor: Liu Bo

Marquis of Haihun
- Reign: 63–59 BC
- Born: Liu He (劉賀) c. 92 BC; Changyi, Han dynasty
- Died: 8 September 59 BC (aged about 32–33); Haihun County, Yuzhang Commandery, Han dynasty
- Issue: Liu Chongguo; Liu Fengqin; Liu Daizong
Names
- Liu He (劉賀)
Era dates
- Yuanping (元平)
- House: Liu
- Dynasty: Han (Western Han)
- Father: Liu Bo

Marquis of Haihun
- Chinese: 海昏侯
Transcriptions
Standard Mandarin
- Hanyu Pinyin: Hǎihūn hóu
- Wade–Giles: Hai3-jun1 hou2

Liu He
- Traditional Chinese: 劉賀
- Simplified Chinese: 刘贺
Transcriptions
Standard Mandarin
- Hanyu Pinyin: Liú Hè
- Wade–Giles: Liu2 Ho4

Liu He (traditional Chinese: 劉賀; simplified Chinese: 刘贺; pinyin: Liú Hè; c. 92 – 8 September 59 BC) was briefly the ninth emperor of the Han dynasty. Originally King (or Prince) of Changyi (Chinese: 昌邑王; pinyin: Chāngyì Wáng), he was installed by the powerful minister Huo Guang as emperor in 74 BC, but deposed only 27 days later, and omitted from the official list of emperors. He lost his original kingdom of Changyi and was demoted to the rank of marquis. He was given the new fief of Haihun in modern Jiangxi Province and became known as Marquis of Haihun (海昏侯).

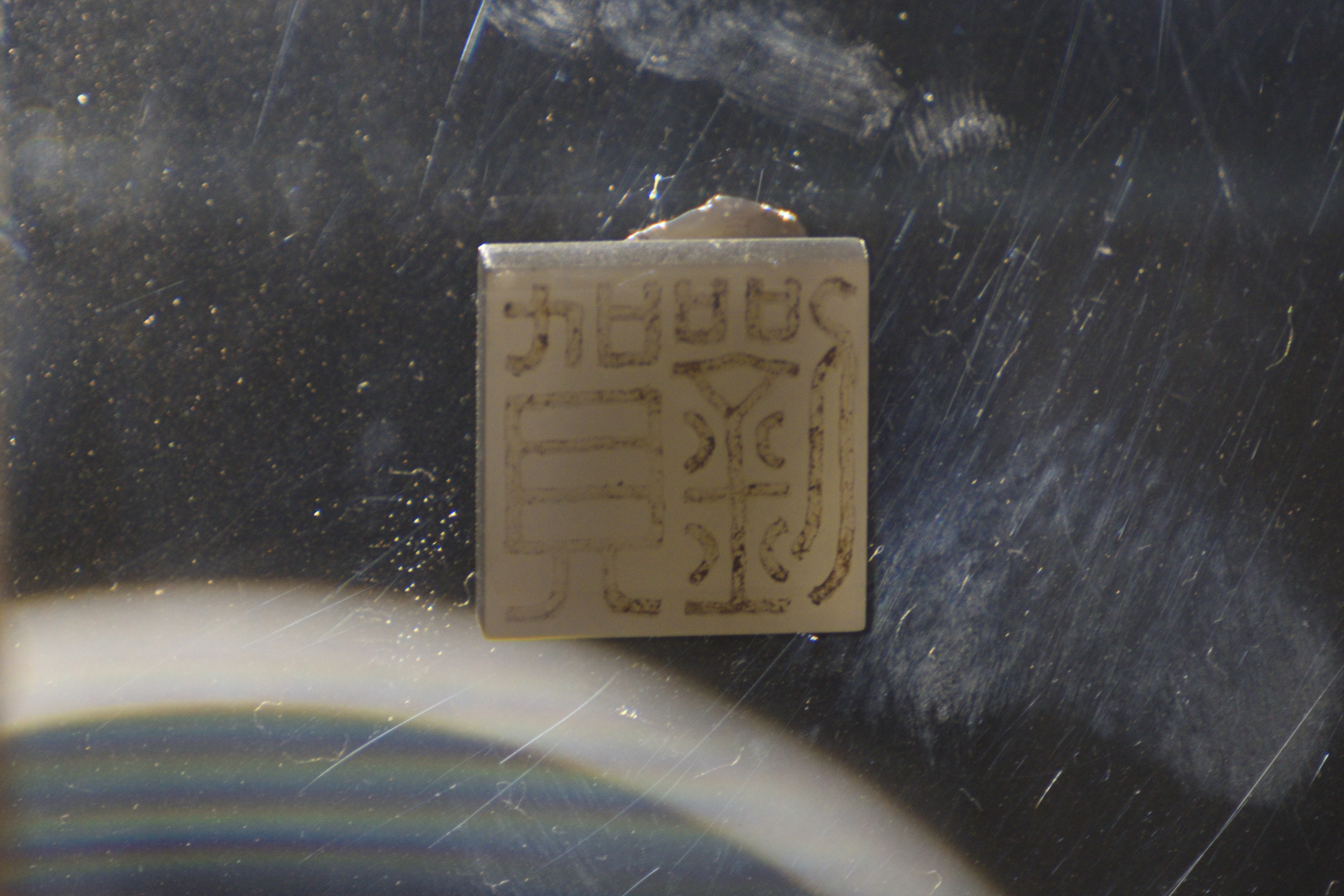
Personal stamp of Liu He

== Background and career as King of Changyi ==
His grandfather was Emperor Wu of Han. His father, Liu Bo (劉髆), King Ai of Changyi (昌邑哀王) died in 88 BC, and he inherited his father's kingdom in 86 BC. Historical records imply that he was a toddler at that time. Liu Bo was a son of Emperor Wu of Han. After Emperor Wu's crown prince Liu Ju committed suicide in 91 BC, Liu Bo was among the candidates for the title of crown prince; the title ultimately went to young Liu Fuling, who succeeded Emperor Wu as Emperor Zhao of Han.

There are issues in gaining an accurate picture of Liu He and his life as King of Changyi because it is based on material written about him after he was deposed, and may be biased, fabricated, or both.

In his teenage years, the mayor of the kingdom's capital, Wang Ji (王吉), offered honest criticism of Liu He's inappropriate behaviour, urging him to be more studious and humble. Liu He appreciated Wang's report and rewarded him, but did not change his ways. Similarly, when Liu He associated with people of ill reputation who engaged in vulgarity and wasteful spending, the commander of his guards, Gong Sui (龔遂) begged him to change his ways, and Liu He agreed, but soon after dismissed the guards that Gong had recommended and brought his previous companions back. Gong could do nothing about it.

== Accession to the throne ==
When Prince He's uncle Emperor Zhao died in 74 BC without a son, the regent Huo Guang rejected Liu Xu (劉胥), the Prince of Guangling and the only surviving son of Emperor Wu, from the succession, because Emperor Wu himself did not favour Prince Xu. He therefore turned to Prince He, who was Emperor Wu's grandson. Prince He was very pleased with this decision, and immediately departed from his capital Shanyang (山陽, in modern Jining, Shandong) and headed for the imperial capital Chang'an, at such a frenetic pace that his guards' horses fell dead from exhaustion. Wang Ji urged him against racing at such speed, reasoning that it was inappropriate during a time of mourning, but Prince He brushed aside the suggestion. Along the way, he ordered local government officials to offer him a special kind of chicken (known for their ability to crow for a long time) and women. (During periods of mourning, he would have been required to abstain from sexual relations.) When Gong confronted him about it, he blamed it on the director of his slaves, who was then executed.

When Prince He arrived at the capital, he first stayed at the Changyi mission to the capital. He then attended a formal session of mourning for Emperor Zhao, before accepting the throne.

== Brief reign as emperor ==
Once he became emperor, Prince He immediately began to give rapid promotions to his subordinates from Changyi. He also failed to observe the period of mourning properly. Rather he feasted day and night and went out on tours. Gong became concerned, but was unable to get Prince He to change his ways.

Prince He's behaviour as emperor surprised and disappointed Huo Guang, who pondered his options. At the suggestion of the agricultural minister Tian Yannian (田延年), Huo began to consider deposing the new emperor. He consulted with General Zhang Anshi (張安世) and Prime Minister Yang Chang (楊敞), who agreed to the plan; Yang agreed upon the urgings of his wife Sima Ying, a daughter of Sima Qian.

== Removal from the throne ==
Just 27 days into the new emperor's reign, Huo and the other officials deposed him. They summoned a meeting of high level officials and announced the plan to depose the emperor, forcing those other officials to go along with the plan or be killed. In a group, they went to Empress Dowager Shangguan's palace to report to her about Prince He's offences and their plan. She agreed with their plan, and ordered that Prince He's Changyi subordinates be immediately barred from the palace. These subordinates (some 200 individuals) were then arrested by Zhang. She then summoned Prince He, who did not know what was going to happen. He only knew something was wrong when he saw Empress Dowager Shangguan seated on her throne and wearing a formal dress made of jewels, and the officials lined up next to her.

Huo and the top officials then offered their articles of impeachment against Prince He, and these articles were read out loud to the Empress Dowager. Empress Dowager Shangguan verbally rebuked Prince He. The articles of impeachment listed as the main offences (in a total of 1,127 examples of misconduct) that Prince He committed during his 27-day reign as an emperor:

- Refusal to abstain from meat and sex during the period of mourning
- Failure to keep the imperial safe secure
- Improperly promoting and rewarding his Changyi subordinates during the period of mourning
- Engaging in feasts and games during the period of mourning
- Offering sacrifices to his father during the period of mourning for his uncle

Empress Dowager Shangguan approved the articles of impeachment and ordered Prince He deposed. He was then transported under heavy guard back to the Changyi mission. Both Prince He and Huo offered personal apologies to each other.

== Post-reign life ==
As part of the articles of impeachment, the officials asked that Empress Dowager Shangguan to exile Prince He to a remote location. However, she did not do so; rather, he was returned to Changyi without any titles, although he was given a small fief of 2,000 households who would pay tribute to him. His four sisters were also awarded smaller fiefs of 1,000 households each.

Prince He's Changyi subordinates were accused of failing to keep his behaviour in check and were almost all executed. Wang and Gong were spared because of their prior advice to him, but were ordered to undergo hard labour. The only other official spared was Prince He's teacher Wang Shi (王式), who successfully argued that he tried to use his teachings of poems to show Prince He what was proper and what was improper. Some historians argued that the reason why the Changyi officials were dealt with so harshly was that Huo was convinced that they were plotting with Prince He to have him killed, but there is no conclusive evidence of either such a plot or that the harsh treatment was as the result of such a plot or suspected plot.

Huo later settled on Liu Bingyi (劉病已), the commoner grandson of the former Crown Prince Liu Ju, an uncle of Prince He, as the new emperor, and he ascended to the throne 27 days later as Emperor Xuan. For years, although Prince He was powerless and without titles, Emperor Xuan was suspicious of him, but a report by Zhang Chang (張敞), the governor of the Commandery of Shanyang, in 64 BC, in which Zhang downplayed Prince He's level of intelligence, alleviated those concerns.

In 63 BC, Emperor Xuan made Prince He the Marquess of Haihun, a county located in modern Jiangxi. It is considered that Emperor Xuan continued to be concerned about Prince He despite Zhang's report, and therefore chose to send him far away from his former principality. Prince He died in 59 BC as a marquess, survived by 16 concubines and 22 children. His son Liu Daizong (劉代宗) was not initially allowed to inherit his title, but ultimately was allowed to do so during the reign of Emperor Yuan.

== Tomb ==
Goose-shaped bronze lamp excavated from the tomb.

The tomb of Marquis of Haihun was found in 2011 and the excavation is ongoing. The tomb is located in the northern part of Xinjian in Jiangxi, in a cemetery that contains in total of nine tombs. About 20,000 artifacts have been unearthed from the tomb. Among the unearthed artifacts, there are more than 300 gold objects, 2 million copper coins, and a mirror containing the earliest known image of Confucius. In 2019, scholar Jue Guo contested the prevailing identification of the artifact as a “dressing mirror,” claiming it was in fact a talisman. Also the long lost Qi version of the Analects was found in the tomb. An application has been submitted for the tomb of the Marquis of Haihun to be listed as a World Heritage Site.

In the over 5,200 bamboo slips found in the tomb, archaeologists have found remnants of an edict by Emperor Xuan of Han regarding the disestablishment of the fief of Haihun following the Marquis and his sons' deaths. Some of the information that has come to light is not recorded in history books such as the Book of Han, including the exact date of the Marquis' death, 8 September 59BC. The slips also mention that the fief of Haihun was struck by numerous natural disasters, including floods and drought. The slips also mention a report by the governor of Yuzhang regarding the disestablishment of the fief, which corresponds with the Book of Han. It has been calculated from the slips that the time between the deaths of the Marquis and his sons and the disestablishment of the fief was less than 40 days.

The disestablishment process of the fief of Haihun was markedly different from the disestablishments of other fiefs. For example, in September 112 BC, Emperor Wu of Han issued an edict disestablishing the fiefdoms of over 100 marquises without discussion at court. The fief of Haihun, however, went through a process of lengthy discussion with court officials, and the final disestablishment edict had over 100 officials sign their name, including 'Cheng Xiang' (Chancellor) Bing Ji and 'Yushi Daifu' (Attorney General) Xiao Wangzhi.

== Textual content of the Marquis' tomb ==
According to preliminary studies, the tomb contains manuscripts with more or less partial overlapping with the following: the Book of Odes, the Analects, the Classic of Filial Piety, and the Spring and Autumn Annals. Other texts from the tomb are:

- the Bao fu 保傅, whose content was previously known from chapters in the Liji 禮記 and Da dai liji 大戴禮記;
- circa ten strips on morality, tentatively titled as Li yi jian 禮儀簡 (Writings on rituals and morality);
- a text titled by the editors Dao wang fu 悼亡賦, whose content is hard to interpret, but seems related to expressions of mourning;
- a text covering the game Liubo 六博, a topic discussed in other manuscripts from the Warring States era;
- a series of strips on divinations. One group has been gather together under the title of Yi zhan 易占, for their content on divination (including names and hexagrams).

== Tomb's artifacts ==
The journal Cultural Relics 文物 has begun publishing articles that introduce the content of the tomb. Two articles published in 2022 introduce the recovery of:

- A dozen shields (90 cm by 50 cm), found on the southern end of the main tomb, on both the right and left sides, together with long wooden poles. The shields have been found shattered in pieces, and were recomposed by scholars. Two of them depict a dragon; one portrays two humans seemingly engaged in a fight with two animals, and has a short inscription reporting the material that went into the production of the shield, its cost, and year of production. This practice of recording the value of the object on the object itself is attested in Han culture.
- Two screens. One screen presents a mirror on one side, identified as a dressing mirror (approximately 96 cm tall by 68 cm across). The bronze mirror is framed by representations identified King Father of the East 東王公, Queen Mother of the West 西王母, and the “Four spirits” 四神. Two pieces of wood decorated with cranes were also found, badly preserved. It is suggested that these were folding panels originally attached to cover the mirror. The verso side has representations of Confucius and his disciples, with their biographies written around the depictions. Guo Jue had argued that this object was in fact a talisman not used in daily-life by the owner. Given the inscription on the object itself, this initial identification appears now incorrect.
- A second screen has been recovered, but it is heavily fragmented due to the screens being located close to where the robbers first entered the tomb prior to a proper archeological excavation. Two human figures can be identified, under a brief inscription. This has been interpreted by Huang Kejia 黄可佳 by taking the mirror as representative of the household.
- A drum support, with an animal figure as its stand.

== Issue ==
- Liu Chongguo (劉充國)
- Liu Fengqin (劉奉親)
- Liu Daizong, Marquis of Haihun (海昏侯 劉代宗)

== See also ==
- Family tree of the Han dynasty
- Book of Songs

Liu He Han dynasty Died: 59 BC
Regnal titles
Preceded by Emperor Zhao of Han	Emperor of China; Western Han; 74 BC with Huo Guang (74 BC)	Succeeded by Emperor Xuan of Han
Chinese royalty
Preceded by Liu Bo	King of Changyi; 88–74 BC	Merged in the Crown
New creation	Marquis of Haihun; 63–59 BC	Vacant Title next held by Liu Daizong, Marquis Li
