= Huo Guang =

Chinese politician (d. 68 BCE)

Marquess Bolu Huo Guang
- 霍光
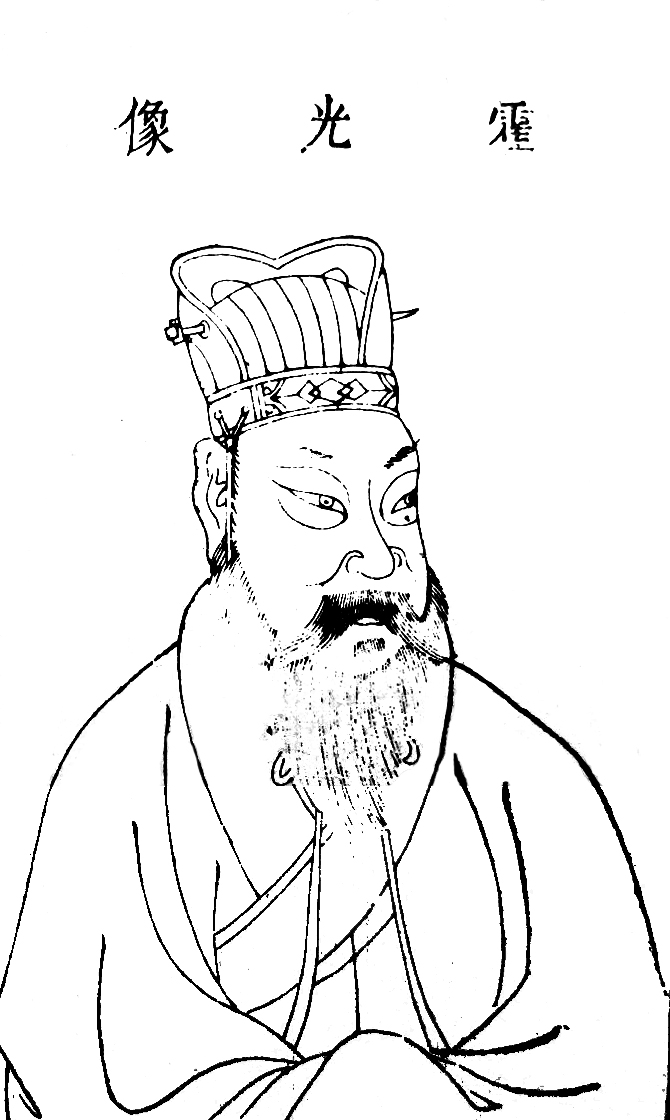
- Portrait of Huo Guang in Sancai Tuhui

Grand Master of the Horse–Grand General
- In office 87 – 68 BC
- Monarchs: Emperor Wu; Emperor Zhao; Emperor Fei; Emperor Xuan
- Preceded by: Wei Qing
- Succeeded by: Wang Feng

Commandant of the Imperial Carriage (奉車都尉)
- In office 117 – 87 BC
- Monarch: Emperor Wu

Counsellor of the Palace (光祿大夫)
- In office 117 – 87 BC
- Monarch: Emperor Wu

Personal details
- Born: Hedong Commandery, Pingyang County, Western Han
- Died: 21 April 68 BC
- Spouse(s): Lady Donglü; Lady Xian
- Children: Lady Huo; Empress Huo Chengjun; Huo Yu, Marquess of Bolu; Lady Huo; Lady Huo
- Parent: Huo Zhongru (father)
- Posthumous name: Xuancheng (宣成)

Huo Guang (Chinese: 霍光; died 21 April 68 BC (Note: Although Huo Guang's age was not recorded, he was in his early teens (by East Asian reckoning) during Huo Qubing's latter campaign successes. Thus, he should be born in the 130s BC.)), courtesy name Zimeng (子孟), posthumous name Xuancheng (宣成), was a Chinese politician and imperial regent who served as the dominant state official of the Western Han dynasty from 87 BC until his death in April 68 BC. The younger half-brother of the renowned general Huo Qubing, Huo was a palace aide to Emperor Wu and secured power in his own right at the emperor's death, when he became principal co-regent for Emperor Zhao. Huo outmaneuvered his colleagues in the regency and assumed personal control over state affairs, consolidating his power by installing family members and other loyalists in key offices. Following Emperor Zhao's death in June 74 BC, Huo engineered the succession and deposition of Liu He within a mere 27 days. Huo next facilitated the accession of Emperor Xuan and retained control of the Western Han government until his death.

== Service under Emperor Wu ==
Huo Guang was born to Huo Zhongru and he had a half-brother named Huo Qubing, a renowned general. His step-aunt was Empress Wei Zifu, (Note: Wei Zifu and Huo Qubing's mother were sisters.) the second Empress of Emperor Wu of Han. Huo's early career in Han government was not well documented, but it is known that as of 88 BC—near the end of Emperor Wu's reign, he was already a high-ranked official with titles of the Commandant of the Imperial Carriage (奉車都尉) and the Counsellor of the Palace (光祿大夫). When Emperor Wu, near the end of his life, chose his youngest son Liu Fuling (later Emperor Zhao) as heir, he commissioned Huo, ethnically-Xiongnu official Jin Midi, and imperial guard commander Shangguan Jie (上官桀) as coregents, but with Huo effectively in command of the government, with the compound title of the Grand Master of the Horse–Grand General (大司馬大將軍). When Emperor Wu died in March 87 BC, Emperor Zhao, then eight years old, was left in the tutelage of Huo, Jin, and Shangguan. Emperor Wu's will created the three of them as marquesses, but all three declined.

== Service under Emperor Zhao and Control of power as regent ==
As Emperor Zhao was the youngest son of Emperor Wu, this created conflict and ill will with his older brothers, and in his reign there were multiple conspiracies. In 86 BC, a conspiracy involving Liu Dan (劉旦), Prince of Yan, and an elder son of Emperor Wu, was discovered, but the prince was not punished, presumably under Huo's decision, even though the other conspirators were executed.

Among the regents and great ministers of Emperor Zhao, Huo Guang is the most prestigious and powerful, leading all of them. Within 6 years from 87 BC to 81 BC, when Emperor Zhao could not decide on his own, Huo took control of the court, and the country was still at peace. Due to holding too much power even though he was not alone, he incurred the jealousy of another main sub-power, the Shangguan family.

In c. March 85 BC, Huo was created the Marquess Bolu (博陸侯). In the same year, Jin, a moderating influence in the co-regency, died. After Jin's death, Shangguan became increasingly jealous of Huo's powers, even though the two had been great friends, and Huo had given his daughter in marriage to Shangguan's son Shangguan An (上官安). In 84 BC, as a ploy to further strengthen his powers, Shangguan Jie gave his granddaughter (also Huo's granddaughter), then age five, in marriage to the emperor, then age 11, and she was made empress in April 83 BC.

In 80 BC, the growing conflict between Huo and Shangguan came to a head. Shangguan formed a conspiracy with Liu Dan, the Prince of Yan, the Princess Eyi (鄂邑公主) (who, as the emperor's sister, had served as his guardian), and another important official Sang Hongyang (桑弘羊) to make false allegations of treason against Huo. However, Emperor Zhao, who trusted Huo, did not act on the allegations. The conspirators then planned a coup d'etat, but were discovered. Most of the conspirators, including Shangguan, were executed, and Liu Dan and the Princess Eyi were forced to commit suicide.

After Emperor Zhao came of age, Huo Guang still had influence over the emperor and the court, helping Emperor Zhao run the empire, so much so that most scholars maintain that Emperor Zhao never held real power. When Emperor Zhao himself could rule, Huo as chief minister and Commander-in-Chief of the Armed Forces of the Capital and the Imperial Army, was a his almost exclusive adviser and political mentor, Huo repeatedly persuaded him to issue amnesties, refrain from costly wars with other nations, focus on electing and promoting able officials at court, avoiding punishment without investigation and trial promoting agriculture, and preserving grain to prevent famine.

== The Prince He Incident and the installation of Emperor Xuan ==
In June 74 BC, Emperor Zhao died at age 21 without issue. Even though Emperor Zhao had living older brothers, Huo considered them incompetent and unfit for the throne. After some investigation, he settled on making Liu He, Emperor Zhao's nephew and the Prince of Changyi the new emperor. Once the Prince of Changyi was installed as the emperor, however, he began to spend incessantly and otherwise act inappropriately during the period of mourning for Emperor Zhao.

In response, Huo decided to depose the new emperor, an unprecedented action in Chinese history. Under an edict issued by Empress Dowager Shangguan (Huo's granddaughter), Prince He was deposed after just 28 days as emperor and exiled to his old principality of Changyi, but without a princely title.

There was no imperial heir who met Huo's standard of a diligent and skilled emperor. At the suggestion of another senior official Bing Ji (丙吉), Huo made a great-grandson of Emperor Wu, Liu Bingyi (later Liu Xun 劉詢) emperor, taking the name Emperor Xuan.. Liu Bingyi's grandfather Liu Ju had been Emperor Wu's crown prince by Empress Wei but subsequently had fallen out of favour and been killed, with his issue being removed from the imperial household.

== Service under Emperor Xuan ==
In 73 BC, Huo offered to return all authority to Emperor Xuan, but the emperor declined and reaffirmed that all important matters were to be presented to Huo before Huo would present them to the emperor. The emperor also made Huo's son Huo Yu (霍禹) and his grandnephews Huo Yun (霍雲) and Huo Shan (霍山) (Huo Qubing's grandsons) key officials in his administration. Huo Guang's sons-in-law Fan Mingyou (范明友) and Deng Guanghan (鄧廣漢) were made high military commanders. During the next few years, Huo and the emperor effectively shared imperial powers.

In 71 BC, Huo Guang's wife, Lady Xian (顯), in order to make her daughter Huo Chengjun (霍成君) empress, poisoned Emperor Xuan's wife Xu Pingjun by bribing her doctor. In April 70 BC, Huo Chengjun was created empress.

Despite Emperor Xuan's outward respect towards Huo Guang, it was recorded that he feared Huo, and regarded him as "a thorn in (his) back" (芒刺在背, "mang ci zai bei"). This, combined with Huo Guang's unwillingness to rein in his clansmen, would prove disastrous to the Huo clan.

== Death and subsequent destruction of the Huo clan ==
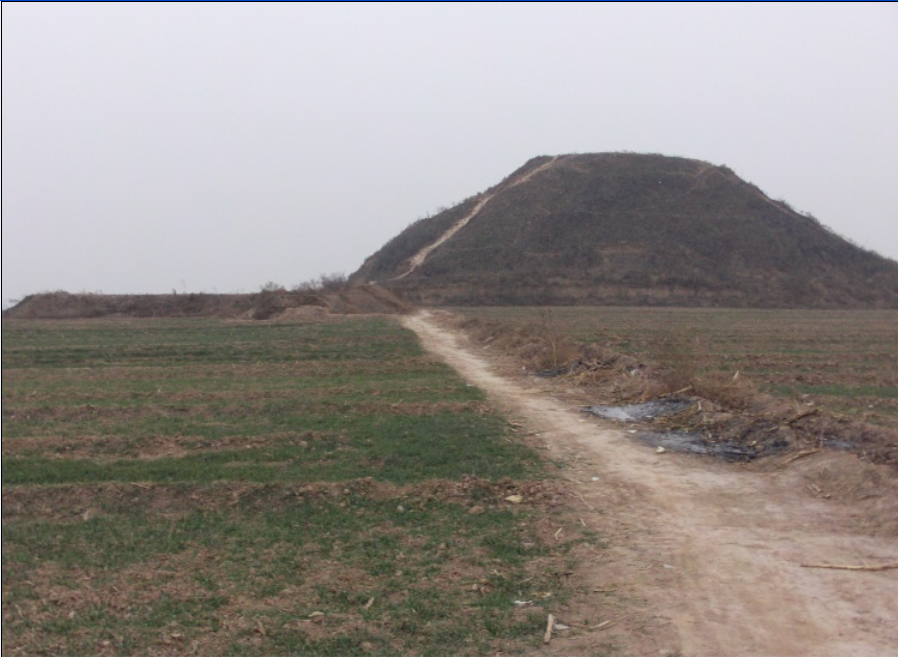
The tomb of Huo Guang in Xi'an, Shaanxi

In April 68 BC, Huo Guang became ill and died. Emperor Xuan and Empress Dowager Shangguan made the nearly-unprecedented act of personally attending Huo's wake and built an impressive mausoleum for Huo. After Huo's death, his sons, sons-in-law, and grandnephews remained in important posts and were made marquesses. His wife, after a period of mourning, formed a passionate relationship with Huo Guang's slave master, Feng Zidu, himself a former lover of Huo Guang. The Huo family lived luxurious lives similar to the imperial household.

Emperor Xuan, unhappy about the Huos' perceived arrogance, began to gradually strip their actual powers while letting them keep their formal titles. In May 67 BC, Emperor Xuan made his son Liu Shi (劉奭, later Emperor Yuan), by the deceased Empress Xu, crown prince, an act that greatly angered Lady Xian, who instructed her daughter to murder the crown prince. Allegedly, Empress Huo did make multiple attempts to do so, but failed each time. Around this time, the emperor also heard rumours that the Huos had murdered Empress Xu, which led him to further strip the Huos of actual power.

In 66 BC, Lady Xian revealed to her son and grandnephews that she had, indeed, murdered Empress Xu. In fear of what the emperor might do if he had actual proof, Lady Xian, her son, her grandnephews, and her sons-in-law formed a conspiracy to depose the emperor. The conspiracy was discovered, and the entire Huo clan was executed by Emperor Xuan. This act later drew heavy criticism from historians, such as Sima Guang in his Zizhi Tongjian, for its ungratefulness to Huo Guang. Empress Huo was deposed. Twelve years later she was exiled and, in response, she committed suicide.

Despite the destruction of the Huo clan, Emperor Xuan continued to honour Huo Guang posthumously. In 51 BC, when he painted the portrait of 11 great statesmen of his administration in the great hall of his palace, Huo, alone among the 11, was referred to by title and family name only, which was considered an even greater honour than the honour given to the other ten.

== Impact on Chinese history ==
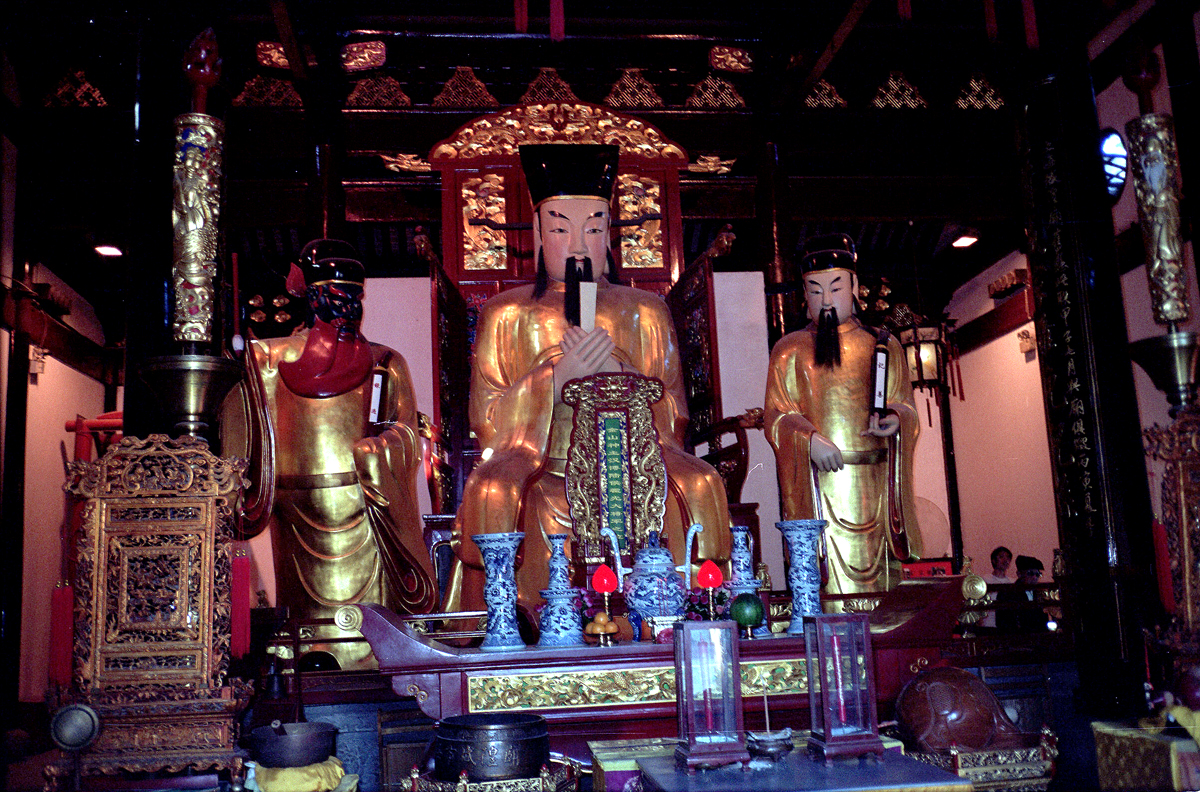
Huo Guang at the center of an altar in Shanghai City God Temple

Huo was treated somewhat paradoxically by posterity. On one hand, he was greatly admired for his skilful administration of the empire and his selflessness in putting himself in great danger in deposing an unfit emperor. On the other hand, he was also criticized for his dictatorial governing style, alleged nepotism and failure to rein in the behaviour of his clansmen, traits that some historians claim eventually led to his clan's destruction after his death.

Many later conspirators in Chinese history would often claim that they were acting in the empire's best interest, like Huo, even though few actually did. Conversely, when emperors wanted to accuse (and execute) officials of treason, they often euphemistically refer to them as "wanting to act like Huo Guang." Effectively, Huo set a standard of decisiveness and strength that was rarely matched and even more rarely used for the benefit of the state.
