= Tian Qianqiu =

Han dynasty prime minister (died 77 BC)

Tian Qianqiu (Chinese: 田千秋, ？- 77BC) was a Han dynasty politician who served as prime minister for 12 years during the reign of Emperor Wu of Han and Emperor Zhao of Han. He was the host of the debate of Salt and Iron in 81 BC. Due to his then-advanced age, Emperor Zhao allowed him to use a chariot as transportation while attending court sessions, instead of remaining on foot. Thus, he was also known as "Prime Minister of the Chariot" (车丞相) or "Che Qianqiu" (车千秋; his biography in the Book of Han is listed under this name).

According to the Book of Han, Tian was a descendant of the ruling house of the dukedom of Qi. His family migrated to Changling Country where he was born. His first appointment in the imperial court was Gaoqinglang (高寢郎), the guard of the shrine of Emperor Gaozu of Han, the founder of the Han dynasty. After the rebellion caused by Crown Prince Wei, he stood by the side of the crown prince by pointing out Emperor Wu's shortcomings as a father. Emperor Wu was impressed by his uprightness and appointed him the position of Dahonglu (大鸿胪). Shortly afterward, Tian became prime minister and was granted the title of "Marquess who Enriches the People" (富民候, Fu Min Hou).

Emperor Wu, on his deathbed, delivered his son Fuling (the later Emperor Zhao) to Huo Guang, Sang Hongyang, Shangguan Jie and Jin Midi. Although the four ministers were thus in charge of the imperial court, Tian remained in his post.

Although Tian remained as prime minister until his death in 77 BC, no major political achievements were made by him. Huo Guang, on the other hand, became the de facto ruler of China during the reign of Emperor Zhao of Han. Possibly due to his political nonchalance, Tian was applauded by Huo for being "prudent".

Tian hosted the debate of Salt and Iron in the sixth year of the Shiyuan era (81 BC). During the debate, Tian kept his silence without uttering a word. He was later criticized by Huan Kuan, the recorder of the debate, for being extremely evasive. However, without further judgements, it can be said that Tian maintained his neutrality during the debate.
