= Discourses on Salt and Iron =

81 BCE policy debate in Han China

The Discourses on Salt and Iron (Chinese: 鹽鐵論; pinyin: Yán Tiě Lùn) was a debate held at the imperial court in 81 BCE on state policy during the Han dynasty in China. The previous emperor, Emperor Wu, had reversed the laissez-faire policies of his predecessors and imposed a wide variety of state interventions, such as creating monopolies on China's salt and iron enterprises, price stabilization schemes, and taxes on capital. These actions sparked a fierce debate as to the policies of the Emperor. After his death in 87 BCE, during the reign of Emperor Zhao of Han, the regent Huo Guang called on all the scholars of the empire to come to the capital, Chang'an, to debate the government's economic policies.

The debate was characterized by two opposing factions, the reformists and the modernists. The reformists were largely Confucian scholars who opposed the policies of Emperor Wu and demanded the abolition of the monopolies on salt and iron, an end to the state price stabilization schemes, and huge cuts in government expenditures to reduce the burden on the citizenry. The Modernists supported the continuation of Emperor Wu's policies in order to appropriate the profits of private merchants into state coffers to fund the government's military and colonization campaigns in the north and west.

The results of these debates were mixed. Although the Modernists were largely successful and their policies were followed through most of the Western Han after Emperor Wu, the Reformists repealed these policies during the Eastern Han, save for the government monopoly on minting coins.

The debates were later compiled into Discourses by the official Huan Kuan (桓宽) during the reign of Emperor Xuan of Han, during Huan's tenure as assistant to the Administrator of Lujiang. (Note: Huan was mentioned in the Book of Han, where he was referred to by his first known position as Chancellor of Ru'nan.) (Note: The debates were hosted by chancellor Tian Qianqiu, but he remained silent throughout the debates.)

== Background ==
The discourses on salt and iron took place behind a tumultuous background. The previous ruler, Emperor Wu of Han, had undertaken a drastic change in policy compared to his predecessors. Reversing their laissez-faire policy at home and policy of appeasement of the Xiongnu abroad, he nationalized coinage, salt, and iron in order to pay for his massive campaigns against the Xiongnu confederacy, which posed a threat to the Chinese empire and a limitation to its expansion. Although Wu was successful in his campaigns, his policies bankrupted many merchants and industrialists, led to widespread dissatisfaction, and even revolts against imperial authority. After his death, the regent Huo Guang called a court conference to discuss whether to continue Wu's policies.

=== Policies in the early Han ===
Policies in the early Han were marked by laissez-faire principles, due to the adoption by the early emperors of the Taoist principle of Wu wei (無為), literally meaning "do nothing". As part of their laissez-faire policy, agricultural taxes were reduced from 1/15 of agricultural output to 1/30, and for a brief period abolished entirely. In addition, the labor corvée required of peasants was reduced from one month every year to one month every three years. The minting of coins was privatized, while Qin taxes on salt and other commodities were removed.

Later opponents of taxation described the early Han as a prosperous period and lamented what they saw as overtaxation. Under Emperor Jing of Han,

... the ropes used to hang the bags of coins were breaking apart due to the weight, and bags of grain which had been stored for several years were rotting because they had been neglected and not eaten.

Severe criminal punishments, such as cutting off the nose of an offender, were abolished.

Merchants and industrialists in particular prospered during this period. In the early Western Han, the wealthiest men in the empire were the merchants who produced and distributed salt and iron, acquiring wealth that rivaled the annual tax revenues collected by the imperial court. These merchants invested in land, becoming great landowners and employing large numbers of peasants. A salt or iron industrialist could employ over one thousand peasants to extract either liquid brine, sea salt, rock salt, or iron ore.

=== Emperor Wu's policies ===
Emperor Wu of Han (r. 141–87 BCE) viewed such large-scale private industries as a threat to the state, as they drew the peasants' loyalties away from farming and towards the industrialists. Nationalizing the salt and iron trades eliminated this threat and produced large profits for the state. This policy was successful in financing Emperor Wu's campaigns of challenging the nomadic Xiongnu Confederation while colonizing the Hexi Corridor and what is now Xinjiang of Central Asia, Northern Vietnam, Yunnan, and North Korea. Other policies included a price stabilization scheme and a tax of 10 percent on the capital of merchants and industrialists who had not yet been expropriated. However, these policies imposed great hardships on the people; banditry and armed revolts were occurring by Emperor Wu's death.

== Debate ==
As complaints surfaced criticizing more and more about the government's policies, the regent Huo Guang, who was the de facto ruler of China after Emperor Wu of Han, called a court conference to debate whether the policies of Emperor Wu should be continued. The resulting debate was divided into two groups, the reformists and the modernists. The reformists, largely provincial Confucian scholars, backed privatization and a return to the laissez-faire policies of old. The modernists, on the other hand, largely represented the interests of the central government and were more in tune with legalist philosophy, as well as being admirers of the previous Qin dynasty, whose harsh and numerous laws had been based on legalist principles.

=== Reformist position ===
The reformist view was based on the Confucian ideal which sought to bring about the betterment of man by conformity to fundamental moral principles. To achieve this, they wished to reduce controls, demands for service, and taxation to a minimum. The reformists' criticism of the monopolies largely centered on the idea that the state "should not compete with the people for profit", as it would tend to oppress the citizenry while doing so; mercantile ventures were not "proper activities for the state". They pointed out that the monopolies had placed an immense burden on the citizenry. In addition, the reformists complained that the state monopolies oppressed the people by producing low-quality and impractical iron tools that were useless and made only to meet quotas, yet which the peasants had to pay for regardless of their quality. The reformers believed former private smelting by small-scale family enterprises made better implements "because of pride of workmanship and because they were closer to the users", in contrast to the state monopoly. In addition, the reformists complained that the state monopolies could not coordinate their production in accordance with the needs of all the provinces of the empire, with some areas overproducing and actually forcing the peasants to buy the surplus. The reformists also criticized the aggressive foreign policy of Emperor Wu, which they believed had weakened instead of strengthening China, and whose costs did not justify the benefits involved.

=== Modernist position ===
The modernists were headed by Sang Hongyang, an ex-merchant who had been selected by Emperor Wu to administer to his new interventionist policies. They justified the imposition of controls on the grounds that they would thus wrest profits from wealthy private merchants that could pose a threat to the state and bring them into state coffers; particularly, modernists claimed that salt and iron industrialists were "brutal and tyrannical," who employed thousands of workers that could potentially become rebels.

The modernists took the view that with its iron monopoly the state could effectively distribute tools of good quality for the use of the peasant, as well as stabilizing the price of many essential goods. They also claimed that private workshops were too small, unspecialized, and poorly equipped. Modernists claimed the government workshops offered better working conditions and access to more materials than private workshops. In addition, the modernists claimed that the expansionist campaigns were necessary to defend China from barbarian incursions, and that by nationalizing the salt and iron industries the state could obtain the funds needed to defend the empire without imposing additional burdens on the peasantry.

== Legacy ==
The modernists survived this debate with most of their policies intact, with only the monopoly on liquor abolished, although Sang was later executed in 80 BCE for treason. Reformists gradually gained more power through the rest of Former Han, due to the growing unsustainability of the Modernists' policies. They briefly succeeded in getting the central government monopolies on salt and iron abolished from 44 to 41 BCE, though this was unsuccessful and the monopolies resumed until the end of Wang Mang's (r. 9–23 CE) regime, which imposed the policies which fused modernism's economic interventionism elements and reformism's egalitarianism elements. After his overthrow, the government of later Han resumed earlier laissez faire policies and relinquished control of these industries to private businessmen.

== See also ==
- Crowding out (economics)
- Economy of the Han dynasty
- Salt in Chinese history

== Sources ==
- Bielenstein, Hans (1987), "Wang Mang, the Restoration of the Han Dynasty, and Later Han", in Twitchett, Denis; Fairbank, John K. (eds.), The Ch'in and Han Empires, 221 B.C. – A.D. 220, The Cambridge History of China, vol. 1, Cambridge: Cambridge University Press, pp. 223–90, ISBN 978-0521243278
- Hinsch, Bret (2002), Women in Imperial China, Lanham: Rowman & Littlefield, ISBN 978-0742518728
- Ji, Jianghong; et al. (2005a), Encyclopedia of China History (in Chinese), vol. 1, Beijing publishing house, ISBN 978-7900321541
- Li, Bo; Zheng, Yin (2001). 5000 years of Chinese history (in Chinese). Inner Mongolian People's publishing corp. ISBN 7-204-04420-7.
- Loewe, Michael (1986), "Former Han Dynasty", in Twitchett, Denis; Fairbank, John K. (eds.), The Ch'in and Han Empires, 221 B.C. – A.D. 220, Cambridge History of China, vol. 1, Cambridge: Cambridge University Press, pp. 103–223, ISBN 978-0521243278
- Nishijima, Sadao (1986). "The Economic and Social History of Former Han". In Twitchett, Denis; Fairbank, John K. (eds.). The Ch'in and Han Empires, 221 B.C. – A.D. 220. Cambridge History of China, 1. Cambridge: Cambridge University Press. pp. 545–607. ISBN 0-521-24327-0.
- Wagner, Donald B. (2001), The State and the Iron Industry in Han China, Copenhagen: Nordic Institute of Asian Studies Publishing, ISBN 978-8787062831
- Kuan Huan, Translated by Esson McDowell Gale. Discourses on Salt and Iron: A Debate on State Control of Commerce and Industry in Ancient China, Chapters I-XIX (Leyden: E. J. Brill Ltd., 1931; rpr, Taipei, Ch'engwen, 1967, including Esson M. Gale, Peter Boodberg, and T.C. Liu, "Discourses on Salt and Iron" Journal of the North China Branch of the Royal Asiatic Society 65: 73-110 (1934)). The translation, with Chinese text, is available online at Discourses on Salt and Iron The Institute for Advanced Technology in the Humanities.
