= Economy of the Han dynasty =

Second imperial dynasty of China (202 BC–220 AD)

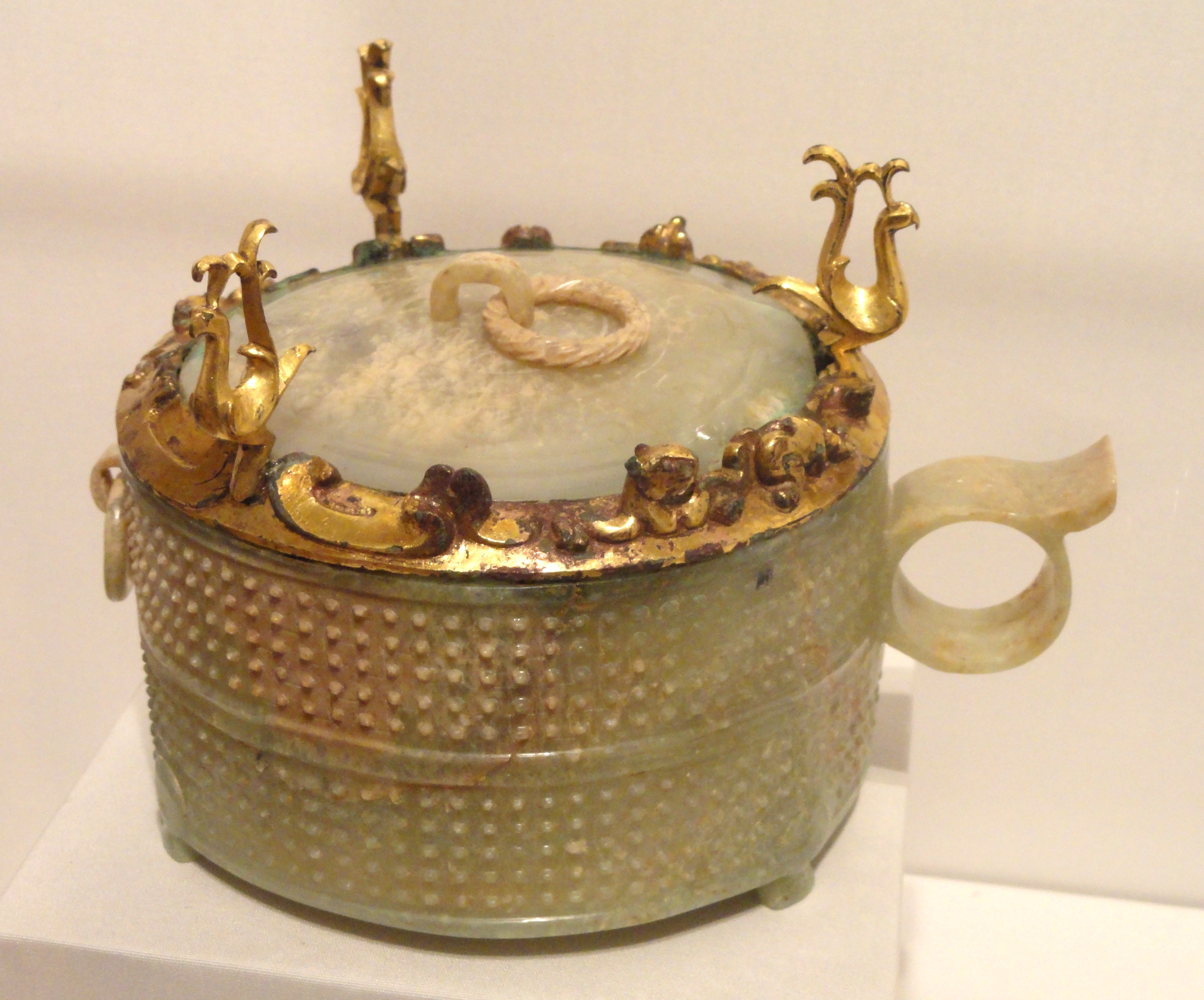
A Western Han (202 BC – 9 AD) covered jade cup with gilt bronze fittings, Sackler Museum

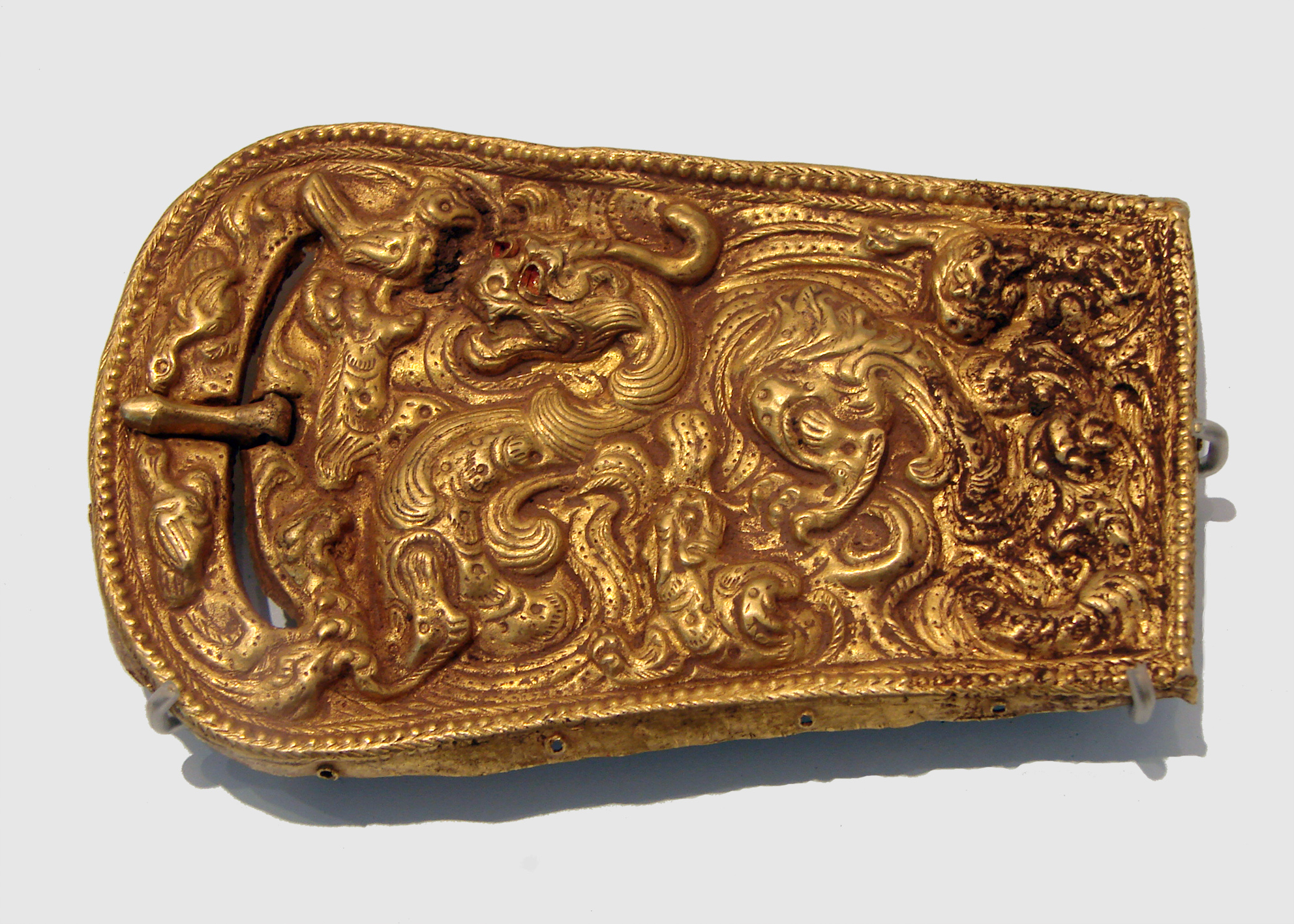
An Eastern Han (25–220 AD) golden belt hook, hammered and chiseled with designs of mythical animals and birds

The economy of the Han dynasty (206 BC – 220 AD) of ancient China experienced upward and downward movements in its economic cycle, periods of economic prosperity and decline. It is normally divided into three periods: Western Han (206 BC – 9 AD), the Xin dynasty (9–23 AD), and Eastern Han (25–220 AD). The Xin regime, established by the former regent Wang Mang, formed a brief interregnum between lengthy periods of Han rule. Following the fall of Wang Mang, the Han capital was moved eastward from Chang'an to Luoyang. In consequence, historians have named the succeeding eras Western Han and Eastern Han respectively.

The Han economy was defined by significant population growth, increasing urbanization, unprecedented growth of industry and trade, and government experimentation with nationalization. Another large component of the government is that it was run by influential families who had the most money. In this era, the levels of minting and circulation of coin currency grew significantly, forming the foundation of a stable monetary system. The Silk Road facilitated the establishment of trade and tributary exchanges with foreign countries across Eurasia, many of which were previously unknown to the people of ancient China. The imperial capitals of both Western Han (Chang'an) and Eastern Han (Luoyang) were among the largest cities in the world at the time, in both population and area. Here, government workshops manufactured furnishings for the palaces of the emperor and produced goods for the common people. The government oversaw the construction of roads and bridges, which facilitated official government business and encouraged commercial growth. Under Han rule, industrialists, wholesalers, and merchants—from minor shopkeepers to wealthy businessmen—could engage in a wide range of enterprises and trade in the domestic, public, and even military spheres.

In the early Han period, rural peasant farmers were largely self-sufficient, but they began to rely heavily upon commercial exchanges with the wealthy landowners of large agricultural estates. Many peasants subsequently fell into debt and were forced to become either hired laborers or rent-paying tenants of the land-owning classes. The Han government continually strove to provide economic aid to poor farmers, who had to compete with powerful and influential nobles, landowners, and merchants. The government tried to limit the power of these wealthy groups through heavy taxation and bureaucratic regulation. Emperor Wu's (r. 141 – 87 BC) government even nationalized the iron and salt industries; however, these government monopolies were abolished during Eastern Han. Increasing government intervention in the private economy during the late 2nd century BC severely weakened the commercial merchant class. This allowed wealthy landowners to increase their power and to ensure the continuation of an agrarian-dominated economy. The wealthy landlords eventually dominated commercial activities as well, maintaining control over the rural peasants—upon whom the government relied for tax revenues, military manpower, and public works labor. By the 180s AD, economic and political crises had caused the Han government to become heavily decentralized, while the great landowners became increasingly independent and powerful in their communities.

== Monetary system and urbanization ==
=== Urbanization and population ===
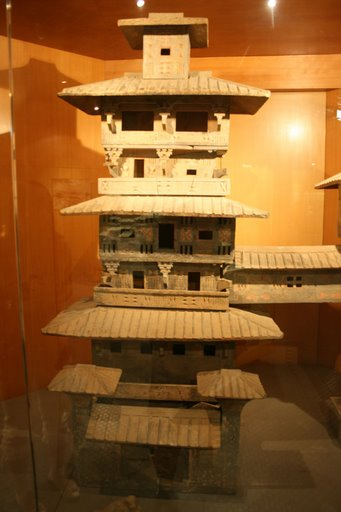
A painted ceramic architectural model—found in a Han tomb—depicting an urban residential tower with verandas, tiled rooftops, dougong support brackets, and a covered bridge extending from the third floor to another tower

During the Warring States period (403–221 BC), the development of private commerce, new trade routes, handicraft industries, and a money economy led to the growth of new urban centers. These centers were markedly different from the older cities, which had merely served as power bases for the nobility. The use of a standardized, nationwide currency during the Qin dynasty (221–206 BC) facilitated long-distance trade between cities. Many Han cities grew large: the Western Han capital, Chang'an, had approximately 250,000 inhabitants, while the Eastern Han capital, Luoyang, had approximately 500,000 inhabitants. The population of the Han Empire, recorded in the tax census of 2 AD, was 57.6 million people in 12,366,470 households. The majority of commoners who populated the cities lived in extended urban and suburban areas outside the city walls and gatehouses. The total urban area of Western-Han Chang'an—including the extensions outside the walls—was 36 km^{2} (14 sq mi). The total urban area of Eastern-Han Luoyang—including the extensions outside the walls—was 24.5 km^{2} (9.5 sq mi). Both Chang'an and Luoyang had two prominent marketplaces; each market had a two-story government office demarcated by a flag and drum at the top. Market officials were charged with maintaining order, collecting commercial taxes, setting standard commodity prices on a monthly basis, and authorizing contracts between merchants and customers.

=== Variations in currency ===
During the early Western Han period, founding Emperor Gaozu of Han (r. 202–195 BC) closed government mints in favor of coin currency produced by the private sector. Gaozu's widow Empress Lü Zhi, as grand empress dowager, abolished private minting in 186 BC. She first issued a government-minted bronze coin weighing 5.7 g (0.20 oz), but issued another, weighing 1.5 g (0.053 oz), in 182 BC. The change to the lighter coin caused widespread inflation, so in 175 BC Emperor Wen of Han (r. 180–157 BC) lifted the ban on private minting; private mints were required to mint coins weighing exactly 2.6 g (0.092 oz). Private minting was again abolished in 144 BC during the end of Emperor Jing of Han's (r. 157–141 BC) reign. Despite this, the 2.6 g (0.092 oz) bronze coin was issued by both central and local commandery governments until 120 BC, when for one year it was replaced with a coin weighing 1.9 g (0.067 oz). Other currencies were introduced around this time. Token money notes made of embroidered white deerskin, with a face value of 400,000 coins, were used to collect government revenues. Emperor Wu also introduced three tin-silver alloy coins worth 3,000, 500, and 300 bronze coins, respectively; all of these weighed less than 120 g (4.2 oz).

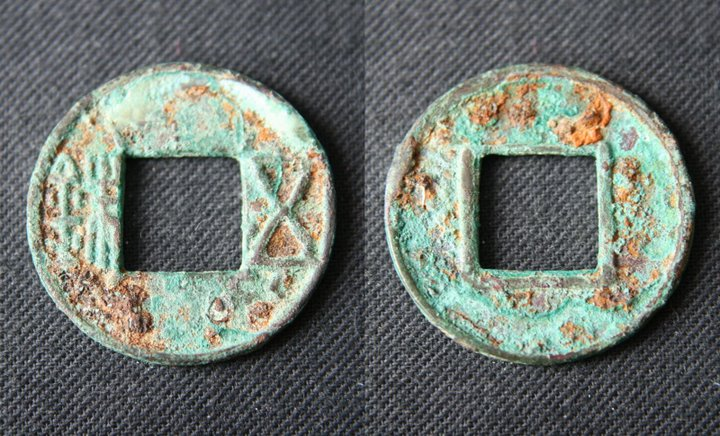
A wushu (五銖) coin issued during the reign of Emperor Wu (r. 141–87 BC), 25.5 mm (1 in) in diameter

In 119 BC, the government issued the bronze wushu (五銖) coin weighing 3.2 g (0.11 oz); the coin remained the standard currency in China until the Tang dynasty (618–907 AD). During the brief interruptive Xin dynasty (9–23 AD) of Wang Mang (45 BC – 23 AD), the government introduced several new denominations in 7, 9, 10, and 14 AD. These new units (including bronze knife money, gold, silver, tortoise, and cowry shell currencies) often had a market price unequal to their weight and debased the value of coin currency. Once the widespread civil wars following Wang's overthrow abated, the wushu coin was reintroduced by Emperor Guangwu of Han (r. 25–57 AD) in 40 AD at the instigation of Ma Yuan (14 BC – 49 AD). Since commandery-issued coins were often of inferior quality and lighter weight, the central government closed all commandery mints in 113 BC and granted the central government's Superintendent of Waterways and Parks the exclusive right to mint coins. Although the issue of central government coinage was transferred to the office of the Minister of Finance (one of Nine Ministers of the central government) by the beginning of Eastern Han, the central government's monopoly over the issue of coinage persisted.

Gary Lee Todd (Ph.D. in history from University of Illinois at Urbana-Champaign and Professor of History at Sias International University in Xinzheng, Henan, China) provides the following images of coins issued during the Western Han and Xin periods on his website:

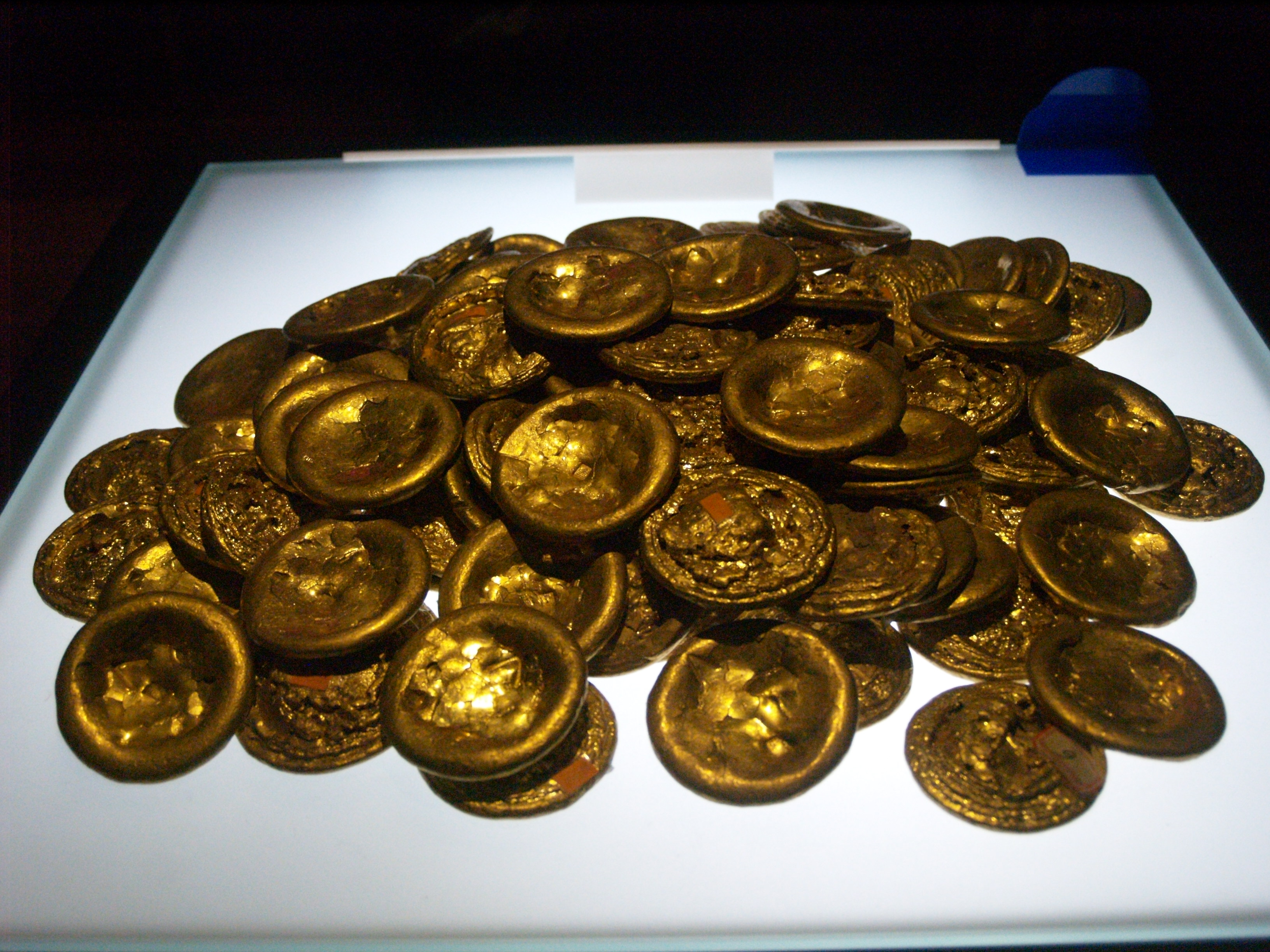
Western Han dynasty (202 BC - 9 AD) gold discs (also called cake-shaped gold), Shaanxi History Museum; excavated from Dongshilipu village, Tanjia town, Weiyang District, Xi'an City, Shaanxi; altogether there are 219 discs, each weighing 227.6-254.4g, their numbers being the biggest among the unearthed gold discs of the Han dynasty. Most of them bear characters, marks, stamps or impressions. They were not meant for circulation as currency, and were mainly used as rewards and gifts.

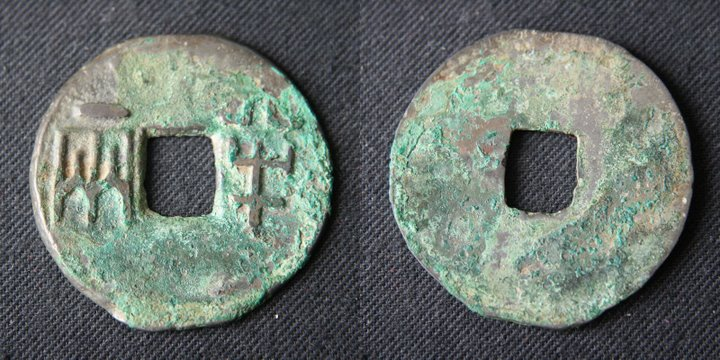
A coin issued during the reign of Empress Lü Zhi (r. 187–180 BC), 34 mm in diameter

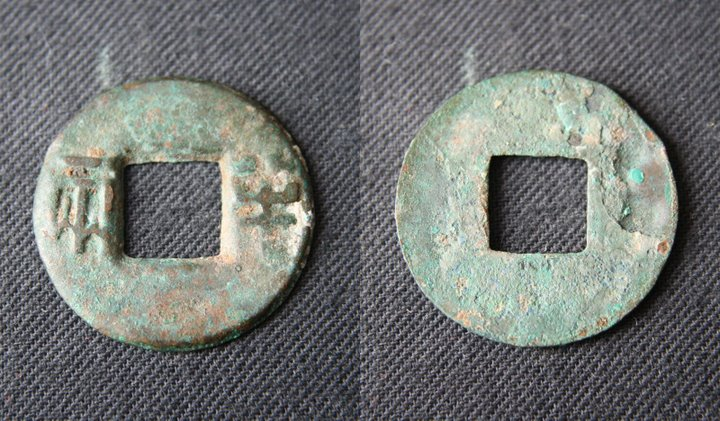
A coin issued during the reign of Emperor Wen of Han (r. 180–157 BC), 24 mm in diameter

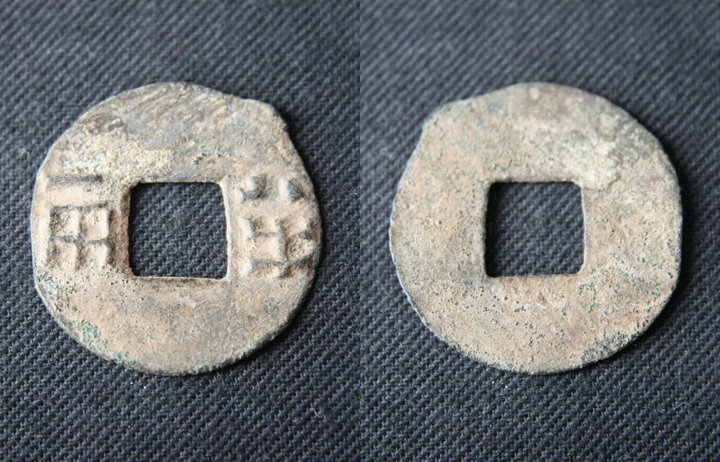
A coin issued during the early reign of Emperor Wu of Han (r. 141–87 BC), made of lead and issued before the government monopoly was installed; this coin is 22 to 23 mm in diameter.

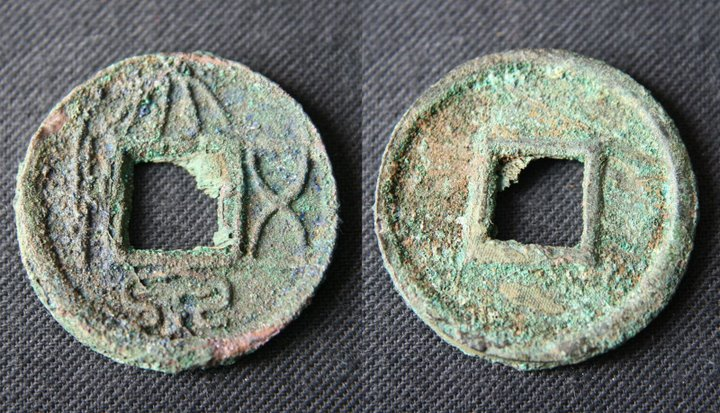
A coin issued during the regency of Wang Mang (6–9 AD), 28 mm in diameter

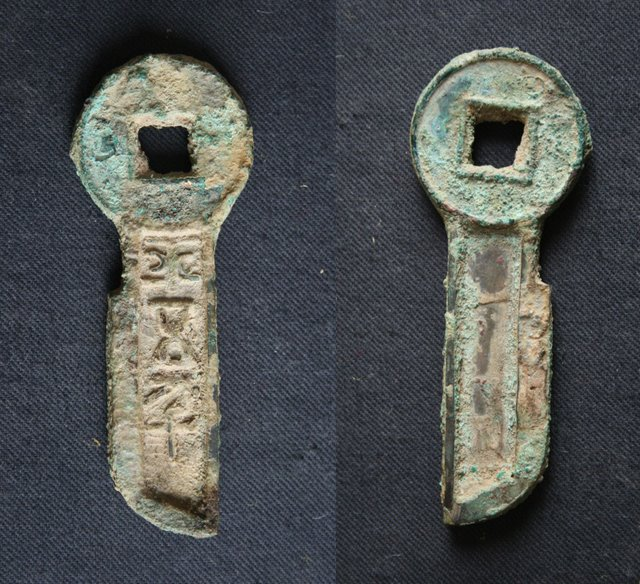
A knife-shaped coin issued during the reign of Wang Mang (9–23 AD)

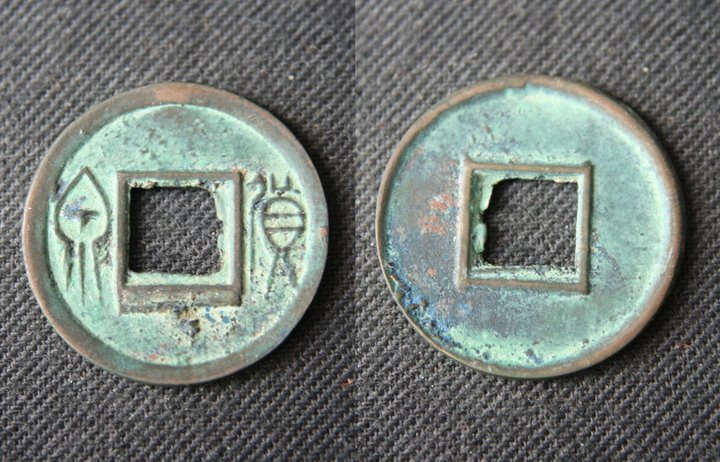
A coin issued during the reign of Wang Mang (9–23 AD), 20 mm in diameter

=== Circulation and salaries ===
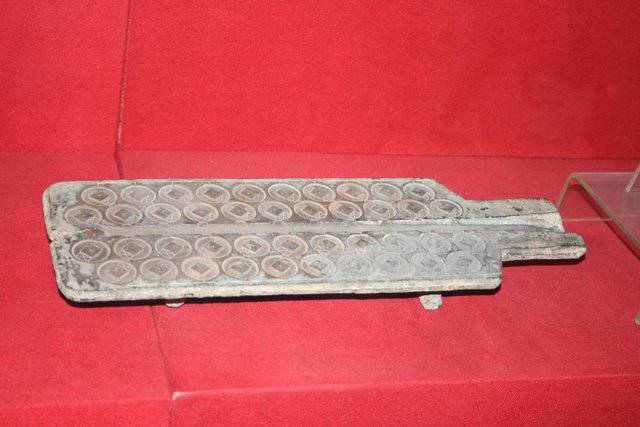
A Han dynasty bronze mold for making wuzhu (五銖) coins; the latter featured a square hole in the center so that strings could pass through and thus allow one to carry many coins at once.

Merchants and peasant farmers paid property and poll taxes in coin cash and land taxes with a portion of their crop yield. Peasants obtained coinage by working as hired laborers for rich landowners, in businesses like breweries or by selling agricultural goods and homemade wares at urban markets. The Han government may have found collecting taxes in coin the easiest method because the transportation of taxed goods would have been unnecessary.

From 118 BC to 5 AD, the government minted over 28,000,000,000 coins, with an annual average of 220,000,000 coins minted (or 220,000 strings of 1,000 coins). In comparison, the Tianbao period (天寶) (742–755 AD) of the Tang dynasty produced 327,000,000 coins every year while 3,000,000,000 coins in 1045 AD and 5,860,000,000 coins in 1080 AD were made in the Song dynasty (960–1279 AD). Coin cash became the common measure of wealth during Eastern Han, as many wages were paid solely in cash. Diwu Lun (第五倫) (fl. 40–85 AD), Governor of Shu Province (modern Sichuan), described his subordinate officials' wealth not in terms of landholdings, but in the form of aggregate properties worth approximately 10,000,000 coin cash. Commercial transactions involving hundreds of thousands of coins were commonplace.

Angus Maddison estimates that the country's gross domestic product was equivalent to $450 per head in 1990 United States dollars—a sum that was above subsistence level, and which did not significantly change until the beginning of the Song dynasty in the late 10th century. Sinologist Joseph Needham has disputed this and claimed that China's GDP per capita exceeded Europe by substantial margins from the 5th century BCE onwards, holding that Han China was much wealthier than the contemporary Roman Empire. The widespread circulation of coin cash enriched many merchants, who invested their money in land and became wealthy landowners. The government's efforts to circulate cash had empowered the very social class which it actively tried to suppress through heavy taxes, fines, confiscations, and price regulation schemes.

== Taxation, property, and social class ==
=== Landowners and peasants ===
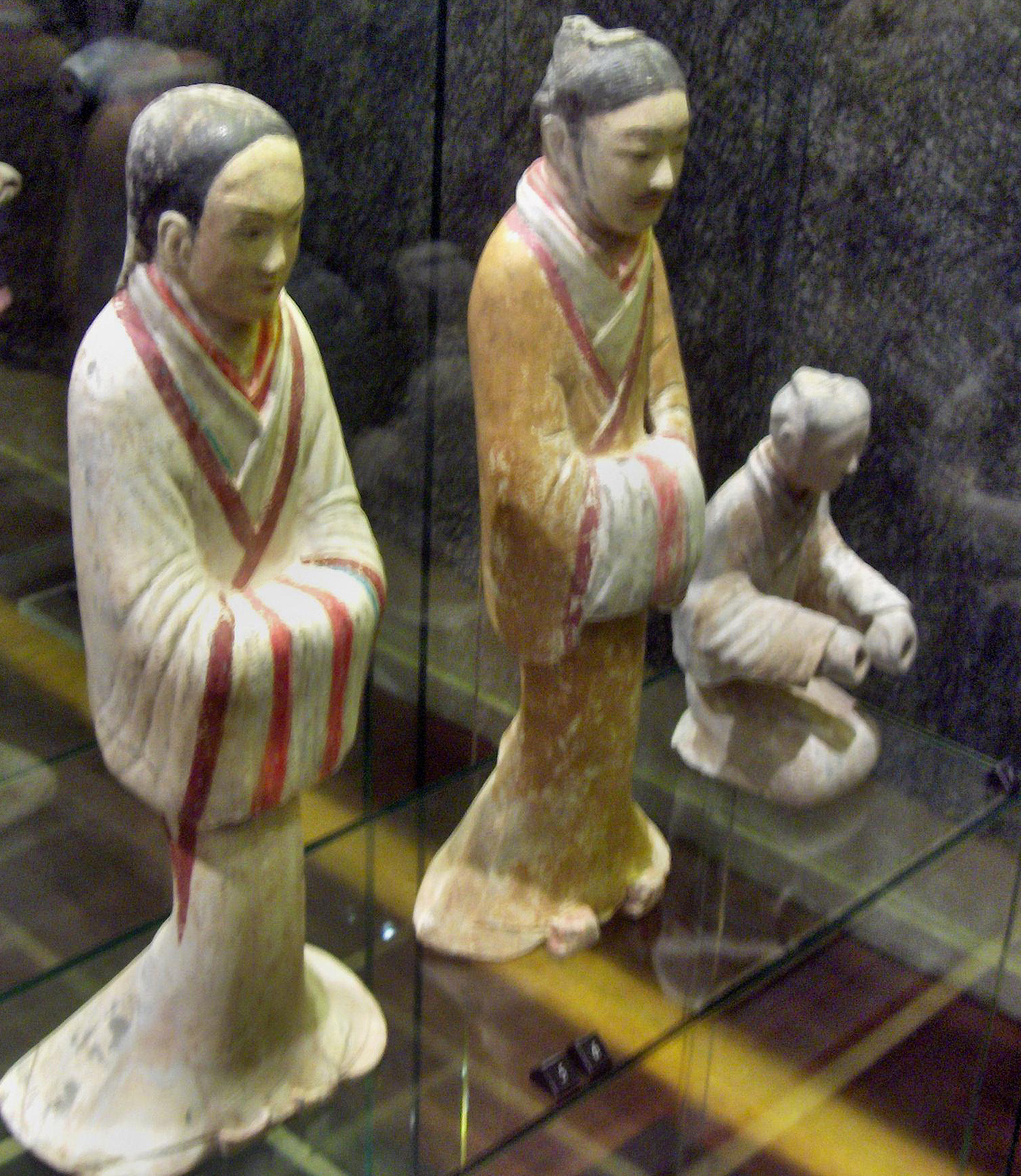
A female servant and male advisor dressed in silk robes, ceramic figurines from the Western Han Era

After Shang Yang (d. 338 BC) of the State of Qin abolished the communal and aristocratic well-field system in an effort to curb the power of nobles, land in China could be bought and sold. Historical scholars of the Han dynasty like Dong Zhongshu (179–104 BC) attributed the rise of the wealthy landowning class to this reform. The Han Feizi describes these landowners' use of hired labor in agriculture, a practice dating back to the 3rd century BC, possibly earlier. Some landowners owned small numbers of slaves, but many relied on peasant tenant farmers who paid rent with a portion of their agricultural produce. More numerous than tenants, small landowner-cultivators lived and worked independently, but often fell into debt and sold their land to the wealthy. The court official Chao Cuo (d. 154 BC) argued that if the average independent landowning family of five could cultivate no more than 4.57 hectares (11.3 acres) of land and produce no more than 2,000 litres (530 US gal) of grain annually, then natural disasters and high taxation rates would force many into debt, to sell their land, homes, and even children, and to become dependent upon work as tenant farmers for the wealthy.

Officials at the court of Emperor Ai of Han (r. 7–1 BC) attempted to implement reforms limiting the amount of land nobles and wealthy landowners could own legally, but were unsuccessful. When Wang Mang took control of the government in 9 AD, he abolished the purchase and sale of land in a system called King's Fields (王田). This was a variation of the well-field system, where the government owned the land and assured every peasant an equal share to cultivate. Within three years, complaints from wealthy landowners and nobles forced Wang Mang to repeal the reform. After Gengshi (r. 23–25 AD) and Guangwu (r. 25–57 AD) restored the Han dynasty, they relied on the service of great landholding families to secure their position in society. Many of their government officials also became wealthy landowners.

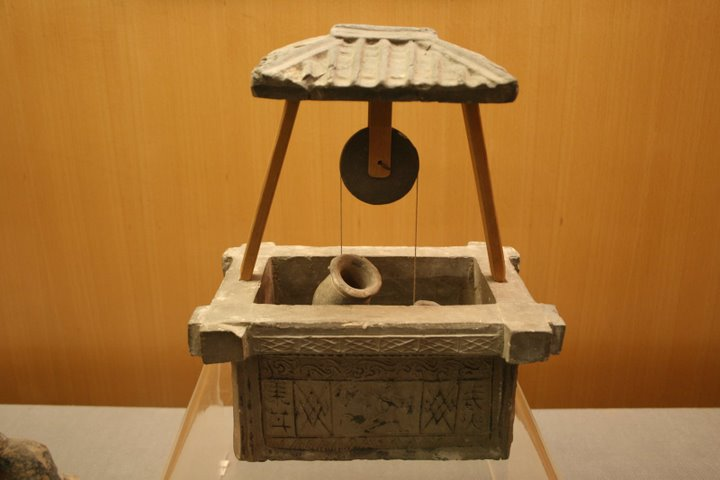
A Han pottery model of a roofed water well with a bucket

By the late Eastern Han period, the peasantry had become largely landless and served wealthy landowners. This cost the government significant tax revenue. Although the central government under Emperor He of Han (r. 88–105 AD) reduced taxes in times of natural disaster and distress without much effect upon the treasury, successive rulers became less able to cope with major crises. The government soon relied upon local administrations to conduct relief efforts. After the central government failed to provide local governments with provisions during both a locust swarm and the flooding of the Yellow River in 153 AD, many landless peasants became retainers of large landowners in exchange for aid. Patricia Ebrey writes that the Eastern Han was the "transitional period" between the Western Han—when small independent farmers were the vast majority—and the Three Kingdoms (220–265 AD) and later Sixteen Kingdoms (304–439 AD), when large family estates used unfree labor.

The Yellow Turban Rebellion of 184 AD, the slaughter of the eunuchs in 189 AD, and the campaign against Dong Zhuo in 190 AD destabilized the central government, and Luoyang was burnt to the ground. At this point, "... private and local power came to replace public authority."

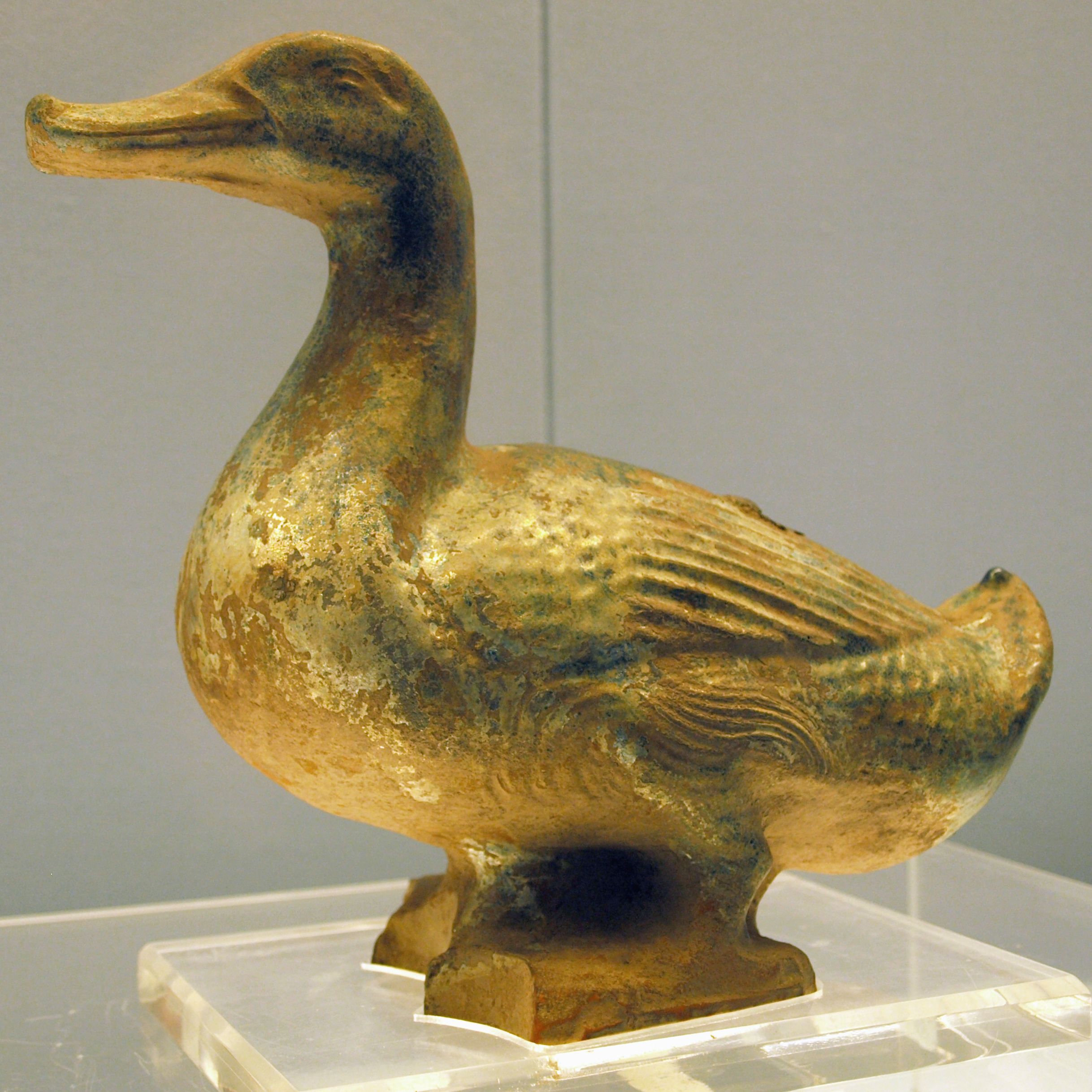
Low-fired green-glazed pottery figure of a duck from the time of the Eastern Han Era

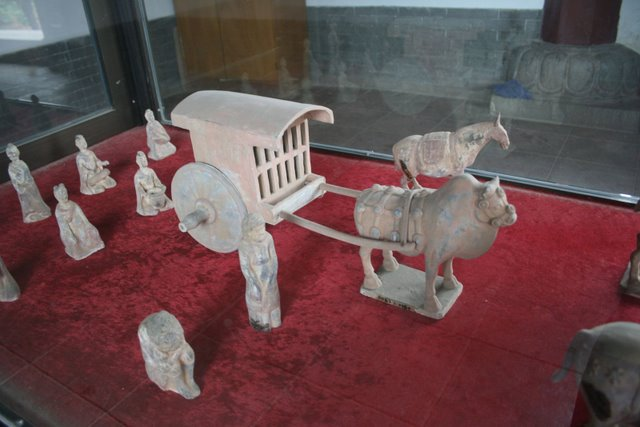
Eastern-Han ceramic figurines of an ox-drawn cart, a horse, and human figures, found in a tomb at Luoyang

The Han Chancellor and King of Wei Cao Cao (155–220 AD) made the final significant attempt to limit the power of wealthy landowners. Cao Cao established government-managed agricultural colonies for landless commoners; in exchange for land and cheap equipment, the farmers paid a portion of their crop yield. In the 120s BC, Emperor Wu had attempted to establish agricultural colonies in the northwestern frontier of the newly conquered Hexi Corridor (in modern Gansu). 600,000 new settlers farmed on these state lands using seeds, draft animals and equipment loaned by the government. An imperial edict in 85 AD ordered the local governments of commanderies and subordinate kingdoms to resettle landless peasants onto state-owned lands, where they would be paid wages, provided with crop seeds, loaned farming tools and exempted from rent payments for five years and poll taxes for three years. The edict also allowed peasants to return to their native counties at any time. Subsequent governments of the Three Kingdoms established agricultural colonies on these models.

=== Subsistence ===
Many scholars claim that Han farmers were generally living at subsistence levels, relying primarily on two documents from the Hanshu (Book of Han). The first is attributed to the Warring States minister Li Kui 李悝 (455-395 BCE); the second is a memorial written by the Han-era official Chao Cuo 晁錯 (200-154 BCE). Both appear in Hanshu Chapter 24, the Treatise on Food and Money 食貨志. Li Kui and Chao Cuo both emphasize the extreme precariousness of Han agricultural life, a view summed up by Cho-yun Hsu, who writes that Han and pre-Han farmers had only "a relatively small margin left to meet other expenses": "An account of the income and expenditures of a small farm in the pre-Ch’in (Chan-kuo) period cited in the Han-shu gives a deficit of 10 percent of the annual income, presumably in a year of mediocre crops… In the time of [Chao Cuo] the situation remained very much the same."

According to Hans Bielenstein, the physical requirements of subsistence in grain can also be calculated from the Hanshu: "a family consisting of an old woman, a grown man, a grown woman, an older child, and a younger child, annually consumed 127 hu of unhusked grain. This comes to about 10.5 hu per month." (According to Swann, one hu 斛 equals 0.565 of a US bushel, which is about 5 gallons or 20 liters). Hsu puts the yearly subsistence figure at 140 hu. Bielenstein also examines salary tables given in both the Hanshu and the Houhan shu (Book of the Later Han) that list official salaries half in cash and half in unhusked grain. Based on these tables, he derives a conversion between cash and hu: a "generally accepted average is 70 to 80 cash for Former Han and 100 cash for Later Han." Based on this conversion, the cash value of the grain needed for subsistence was about 8,890 to 14,000 coins per year during the Han dynasty.

We can also estimate the amount of land needed to produce this amount of grain, thanks to Wolfram Eberhard who "estimates the average yield as being 1.0 to 1.5 shih per mu," though Hsu notes that, "Very high yields could reach as much as 6.4 hu per mu." Swann gives 1 shi 石 (which she translates as "picul" with a weight of "64 lbs. 8.8 oz.") as between 1 and 2 hu, depending on the type of grain. Based only on Eberhard's yields and Swann's range of conversion between shi and hu, a farmer would need between about 85 and 254 mu (between about 9.7 and 29 acres) in order to produce the 127 hu of grain Eberhard deems necessary to the subsistence of a family of five. Other scholars give other numbers, however. Hsu claims that 50 mu (about 5.7 acres) was in fact "the acreage needed for subsistence living," while Wang Zhongshu calculates that "there was on the average 24.6 mou per family, or less than 6 mou per person (with each mou equivalent to 456 square m)." Both Li Kui and Chao Cuo claimed that 100 mu was the amount of land required to support a family, though the amount of land denoted by the word mu had changed between Li Kui's time and Chao Cuo's.

=== Tax reforms ===
Because small landowning families represented the mainstay of the Han tax base, the Han government attempted to aid and protect small landowners and to limit the power of wealthy landlords and merchants. The government reduced taxes in times of poor harvest and provided relief after disasters. Tax remissions and crop seed loans encouraged displaced peasants to return to their land. An edict in 94 AD excused displaced peasants from paying land and labor service taxes for a year upon returning to their own farms. The land tax on agricultural production was reduced in 168 BC from a rate of one-fifteenth of crop yield to one-thirtieth, and abolished in 167 BC. However, the tax was reinstated in 156 BC at a rate of one-thirtieth. At the beginning of the Eastern Han, the land tax rate was one-tenth of the crop yield, but following the stabilization following Wang Mang's death, the rate was reduced to the original one-thirtieth in 30 AD.

Towards the end of the Han dynasty, the land tax rate was reduced to one-hundredth, with lost revenue recouped by increasing the poll and property tax rates. The poll tax for most adults was 120 coins annually, 240 coins for merchants, and 20 coins for minors aged between three and fourteen years. The lower taxable threshold age for minors increased to seven years during the reign of Emperor Yuan of Han (r. 48–33 BC) and onwards. Historian Charles Hucker writes that underreporting of the population by local authorities was deliberate and widespread, since this reduced their tax and labor service obligations rendered to the central government.

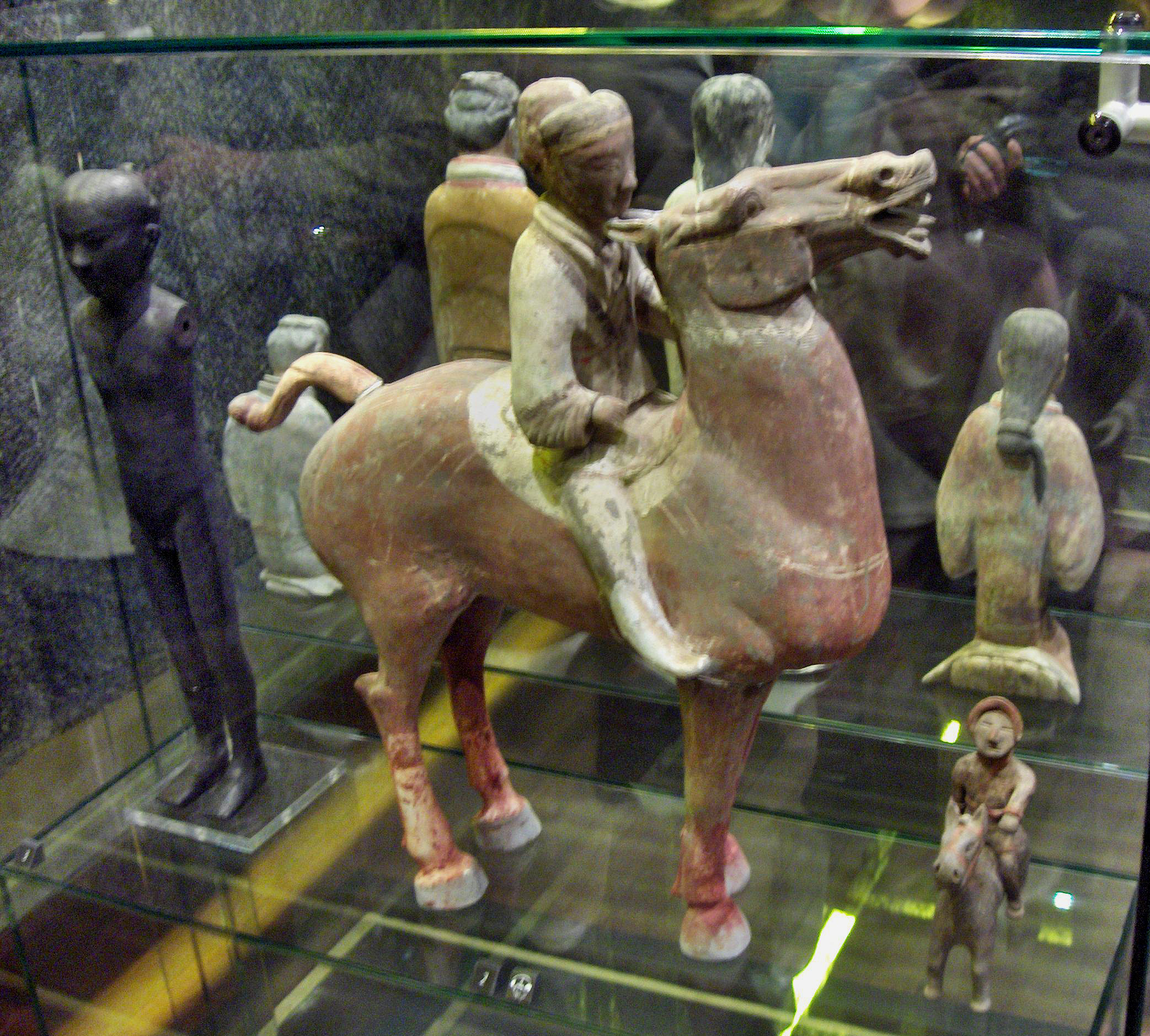
A Western-Han ceramic figurine of a mounted cavalryman, 2nd century BC

Though requiring additional revenue to fund the Han–Xiongnu War, the government during Emperor Wu of Han's reign (141–87 BC) sought to avoid heavy taxation of small landowners. To increase revenue, the government imposed heavier taxes on merchants, confiscated land from nobles, sold offices and titles, and established government monopolies over the minting of coins, iron manufacture and salt mining. New taxes were imposed on the ownership of boats, carts, carriages, wheelbarrows, shops and other properties. The overall property tax for merchants was raised in 119 BC from 120 coins for every 10,000 coins-worth of property owned to 120 coins for every 2,000 coins-worth of property owned. Tax rates for almost all commodities are unknown, except for that of liquor. After the government monopoly on liquor was abolished in 81 BC, a property tax of 2 coins for every 0.2 litres (0.05 US gal) was levied on liquor merchants.

The sale of certain offices and titles was reintroduced in Eastern Han by Empress Dowager Deng Sui—who reigned as regent from 105 to 121 AD—to raise government revenues in times of severe natural disasters and the widespread rebellion of the Qiang people in western China. The sale of offices became extremely corrupt under the eunuch-dominated government of Emperor Ling of Han (r. 168–189 AD), when many top official posts were sold at the highest bidder instead of being filled by vetted candidates who had taken Imperial examinations or attended the Imperial University.

=== Conscription ===
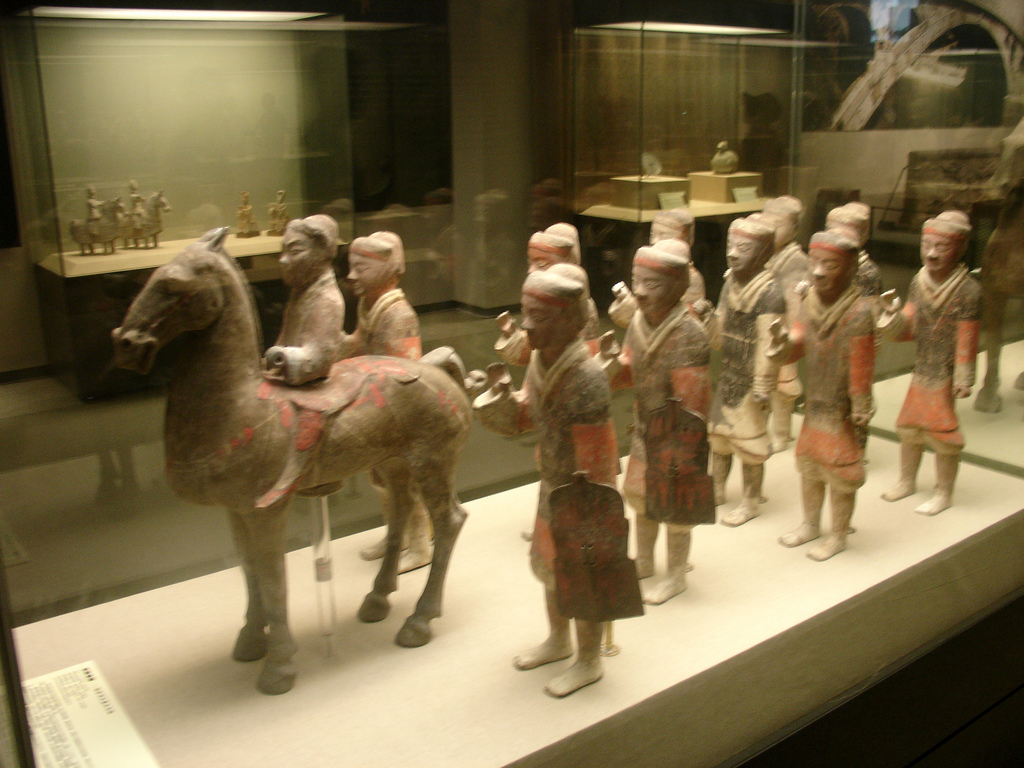
Painted ceramic cavalrymen and infantrymen, Western Han dynasty

Two forms of mass conscription existed during the Han period. These were civilian conscription (gengzu 更卒) and military conscription (zhengzu 正卒). In addition to paying their monetary and crop taxes, all peasants of the Western Han period aged between fifteen and fifty-six were required to undertake mandatory conscription duties for one month of each year. These duties were usually fulfilled by work on construction projects.

At the age of twenty-three years male peasants were drafted to serve in the military, where they were assigned to infantry, cavalry, or navy service. After one year of training, they went on to perform a year of actual military service in frontier garrisons or as guards in the capital city. They remained liable to perform this year of service until the age of fifty-six. This was also the age when they were dismissed from their local militias, which they could join once they had finished their year of conscripted service. These non-professional conscripted soldiers comprised the Southern Army (Nanjun 南軍), while the Northern Army (Beijun 北軍) was a standing army composed of paid career soldiers.

During the Eastern Han, peasants could avoid the month of annual conscripted labor by paying a tax in commutation (gengfu 更賦). This development went hand in hand with the increasing use of hired labor by the government. In a similar manner, because the Eastern-Han government favored the military recruitment of volunteers, the mandatory military draft for peasants aged twenty-three could be avoided by paying a tax in substitution.

=== Merchants ===
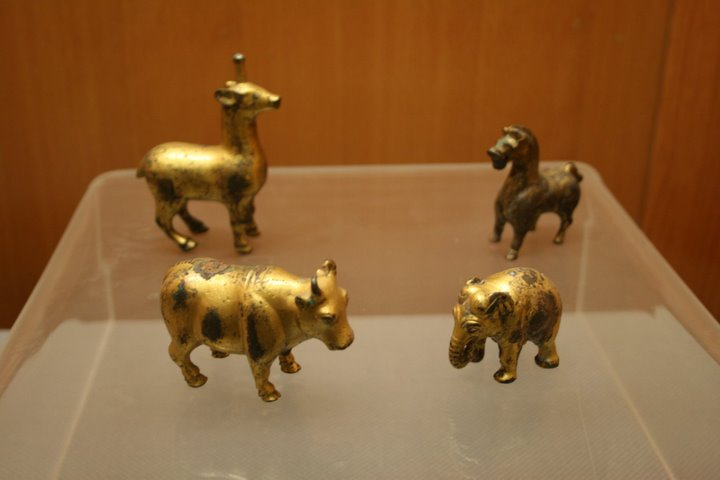
Gilded bronze animal figurines from the Han dynasty, including a horse, elephant, cow, and unicorn

There were two categories of Han merchants: those who sold goods at shops in urban markets, and the larger-scale itinerant traders who traveled between cities and to foreign countries. The small-scale urban shopkeepers were enrolled on an official register and had to pay heavy commercial taxes. Although these registered merchants were taxed, an edict of 94 AD ordered that landless peasants who had to resort to peddling were to be exempted from taxation.

Itinerant merchants were often wealthy and did not have to register. These itinerant merchants often participated in large-scale trade with powerful families and officials. Nishijima writes that most of the biographies of "wealthy men" in the Records of the Grand Historian and Book of Han were those of itinerant merchants.

In contrast, registered marketplace merchants had a very low social status and were often subject to additional restrictions. Emperor Gaozu passed laws levying higher taxes, forbidding merchants from wearing silk, and barring their descendants from holding public office. These laws were difficult to enforce. Emperor Wu targeted both the registered and unregistered merchants with higher taxes. While registered merchants were not allowed to own land, if they broke this law their land and slaves would be confiscated. However, wealthy unregistered merchants owned large tracts of land. Emperor Wu significantly reduced the economic influence of great merchants by openly competing with them in the marketplace, where he set up government-managed shops that sold commodities collected from the merchants as property taxes.

== Crafts, industries, and government employment ==
=== Private manufacture and government monopolies ===
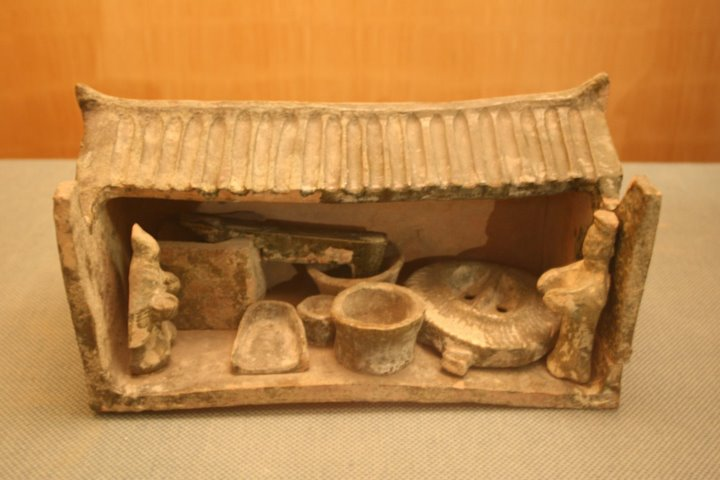
A miniature ceramic model of a gristmill from a Han tomb

==== Iron and salt ====
At the beginning of the Han dynasty, China's salt enterprises were privately owned by a number of wealthy merchants and subordinate regional kings. The profits of these industries rivaled the funds of the imperial court. Emperor Wu had nationalized the salt and iron industries by 117 BC.

The government also instituted a liquor monopoly in 98 BC. However, this was repealed in 81 BC in an effort to reduce government intervention in the private economy.

The Reformist Party supported privatization, opposing the Modernist Party, which had dominated politics during the reign of Emperor Wu and the subsequent regency of Huo Guang (d. 68 BC). The Modernists pointed out that state monopolies provided abundant raw materials, good working conditions, and high quality iron; the Reformist argued that state-owned ironworks produced large and impractical implements designed to meet quotas rather than to be of practical use, were of inferior quality, and were too expensive for commoners to purchase. In 44 BC, the Reformists had both the salt and iron monopolies abolished, but the monopolies were reinstated in 41 BC after their abrupt closure resulted in significant losses of revenue for the government and disruption of the private economy.

Wang Mang preserved these central government monopolies. When Eastern Han began, they were once again repealed, the industries given to local commandery governments and private entrepreneurs. Emperor Zhang of Han (r. 75–88 AD) briefly reintroduced the central government monopolies on salt and iron from 85 to 88 AD, but abolished them in the last year of his reign. After Emperor Zhang, the Han never returned the salt and iron industries to government ownership.

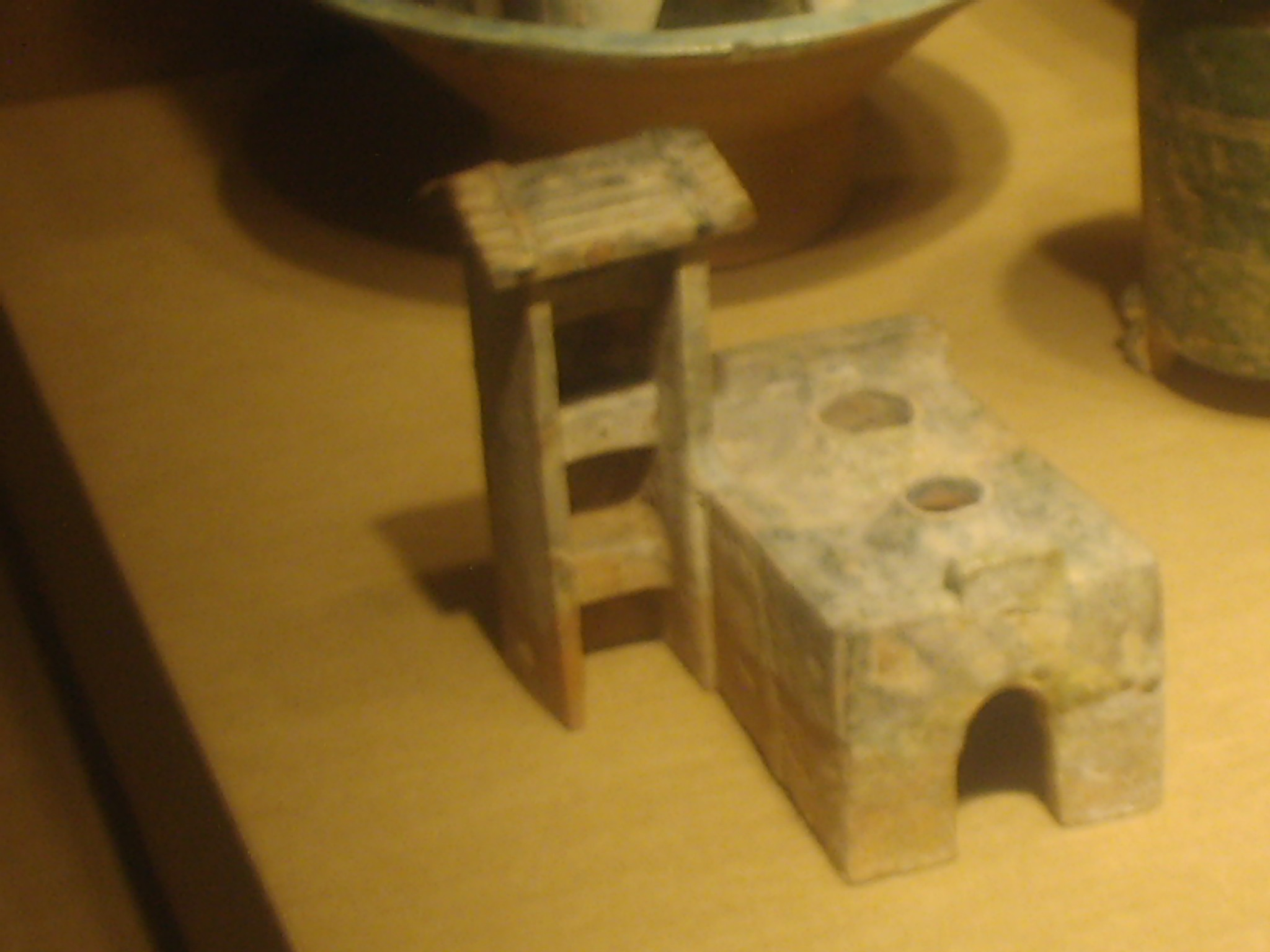
An Eastern-Han glazed ceramic model of a furnace

==== Grain ====
The grain trade was a profitable private enterprise during the early Western Han, yet Emperor Wu's government intervened in the grain trade when it established the equable marketing system (also known as the ever-normal granary system) in 110 BC. The government purchased grain when it was plentiful and inexpensive, shipping it to granaries for storage or to areas where grain was scarce. The system was intended to eliminate grain speculation, to create a standard price and to increase government revenue. The system was designed by civil servant Sang Hongyang (d. 80 BC)—who was previously a merchant. Sang Hongyang was criticized by merchants for placing government officials in market stalls. This supply system was discontinued in Eastern Han, although it was briefly revived by Emperor Ming of Han (r. 57–75). Emperor Ming also abolished the system in 68 AD, when he believed that the government's storage of grain increased prices and made wealthy landowners richer.

Ebrey argues that although most of Emperor Wu's fiscal policies were repealed during Eastern Han, their damage to the merchant class and the subsequent laissez-faire policies of Eastern Han allowed the wealthiest landowners to dominate society, ensuring that China's economy would remain firmly agrarian-based for centuries. The Eastern Han central government lost an important source of revenue by relinquishing its salt and iron industries and purchasing its armies' swords and shields from private manufacturers. However, this loss of revenue was often compensated by higher taxes levied on the merchants.

=== Government workshops ===
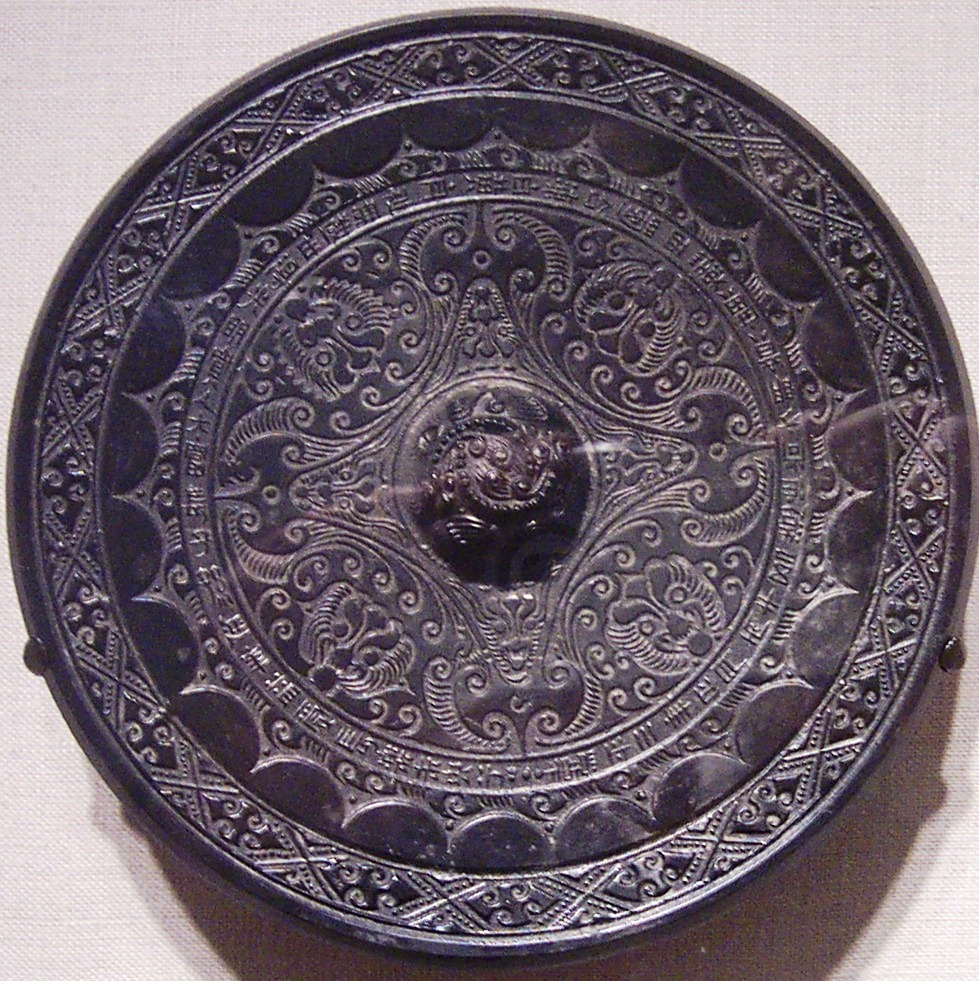
The reverse, decorated side of an Eastern-Han bronze mirror with feline heads in a scalloped field; the mirror is inscribed with the date of manufacture (174 AD)

Han government workshops produced common, luxury, and even artistic funerary items, such as the ceramic figurines and tomb tiles which adorned the walls of underground tombs. Imperial workshops were operated by the Minister Steward, whose ministry controlled the treasury and the emperor's private finances.

The Office of Arts and Crafts, subordinate to the Minister Steward, produced weapons, bronze mirrors, vessel wares, and other goods. The Office of Manufactures, also subordinate to the Minister Steward, made the cheaper weapons, utensils, and armor. Textiles and clothing worn by the emperor and royal family were made in the Weaving House of the West and Weaving House of the East; the latter was abolished in 28 BC, and the Weaving House of the West was renamed the Weaving House.

Workshops located in the commanderies made silks and embroidered fabrics, silver and gold luxury items, and weapons. One workshop, in modern Anhui province, had a shipyard where warships were built. Although the government used the labor of state-owned slaves, corvée laborers, and convicts in its workshops, they also hired skilled craftsmen who were well-paid.

Han lacquerwares were privately made as well as being manufactured in government workshops. Hundreds of laborers could be employed to work on a single luxury item, such as a lacquered cup or screen. Some lacquerwares were inscribed simply with the clan name of the family who owned them. Others were inscribed with the titles of the owner, the specific type of the vessels, their capacities, the precise day, month, and year of manufacture (according to Chinese era names and their lunisolar calendar), the names of the floor managers who oversaw the items' production and the names of the workers who made them. Even some iron implements made during the age of the monopoly bore inscriptions of the date they were made and the name of the workshop. Bronze calipers from the Xin dynasty, used for minute measurements, had an inscription stating that it was "made on a gui-you day at new moon of the first month of the first year of the Shijian guo period." The calipers date from 9 AD. Han lacquerwares bearing the imperial mark of the emperor have been found far beyond the Han capital regions by modern archaeologists, in places such as Qingzhen (in Guizhou), Pyongyang (in North Korea), and Noin Ula (in Mongolia).

=== Public construction projects ===
The Court Architect was charged by central government with overseeing all imperial construction and public works projects, including the building of palaces and tombs.

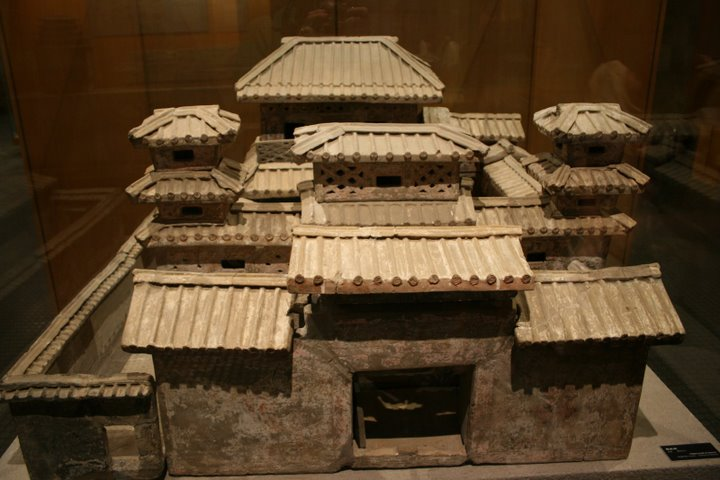
A Han dynasty pottery tomb model of a palatial residence with watchtowers, gatehouses, halls, outer walls, courtyards, verandas, tiled rooftops, and windows

During the Western Han period, conscripted peasants were organized into work teams consisting of over a hundred thousand laborers. About 150,000 conscripted workers, serving in consecutive periods of thirty days each over a total of five years, worked on the massive defensive walls of Chang'an, which were completed in 190 BC. Conscript laborers were commissioned to build and maintain shrines dedicated to various deities and the spirits of the emperor's ancestors. Conscripts also maintained canal systems used for agricultural transport and irrigation. Some of the larger Han canal renovation projects included repairs to the Dujiangyan Irrigation System and Zhengguo Canal, built by the previous State of Qin and Qin dynasty (221–206 BC), respectively.

Nineteen stone inscriptions survive commemorating the building of new roads and bridges by the Eastern Han government. Archaeological excavations at Chang'an show that wooden bridges were built over the defensive moat and led to the gatehouses. Roadways also needed periodic repairs; in 63 AD the route leading from the Qilian Mountains, through Hanzhong (modern southern Shanxi), and towards the capital Luoyang underwent major repairs. For this project, 623 trestle bridges, five large bridges, 107 km (66 mi) of new roadways, and 64 buildings—including rest houses, post stations, and relay stations—were built. Those commissioned with military authority also built bridges. For example, during his campaign against the Xiongnu in the Ordos Desert in 127 BC, the general Wei Qing (d. 106 BC) had a new bridge built over the Wujia River (a former tributary of the Yellow River) in today's Inner Mongolia. He used this bridge to move troops and supplies for an attack on the Xiongnu, northwest of modern Wuyuan County (五原县). Ebrey writes:

There were, of course, numerous reasons for maintaining roads. A unified political system could be maintained only as long as the government had the means of quickly dispatching officials, troops, or messengers as needed. Such a system of transportation, once established, facilitated commerce. At the local level, road and bridge projects seem to have been initiated as much for the sake of traveling merchants as for officials.

== Domestic trade ==
=== Traded goods and commodities ===
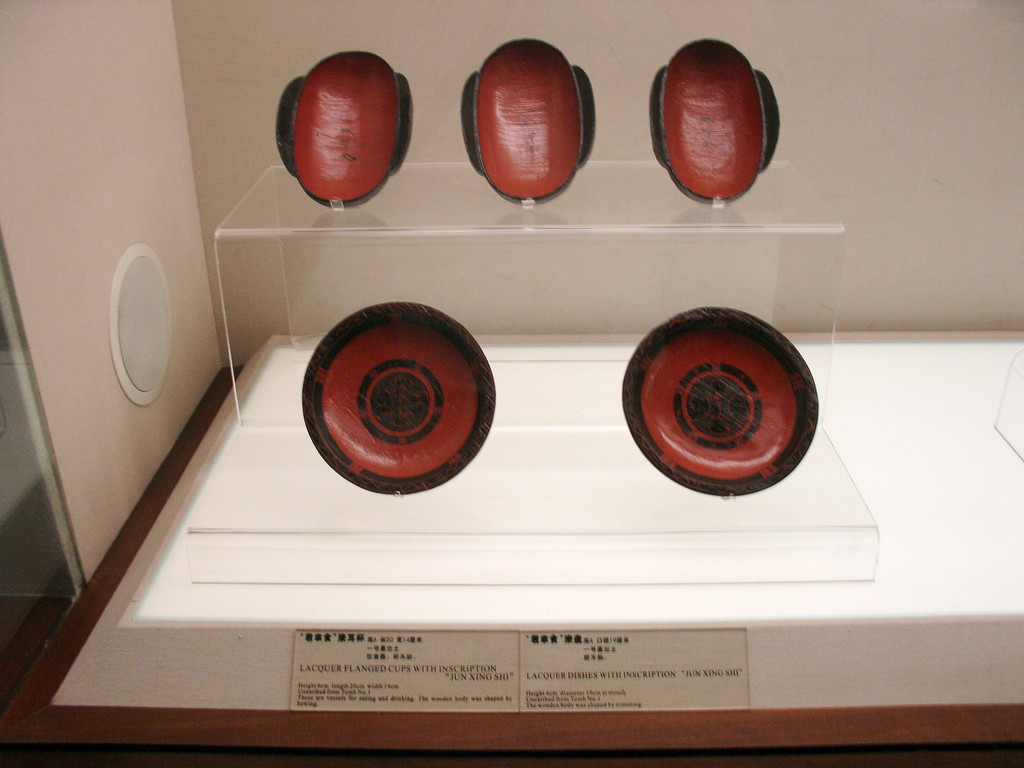
A set of red-and-black lacquerware flanged cups and dishes from tomb no. 1 at Mawangdui Han tombs site, 2nd century BC, Western Han dynasty

Han-era historians like Sima Qian (145–86 BC) and Ban Gu (32–92 AD), as well as the later historian Fan Ye (398–445 AD), recorded details of the business transactions and products traded by Han merchants. Evidence of these products has also emerged from archaeological investigations.

The main agricultural staple foods during the Han dynasty were foxtail millet, proso millet, rice (including glutinous rice), wheat, beans, and barley. Other food items included sorghum, taro, mallow, mustard plant, jujube, pear, plum (including Prunus salicina and Prunus mume), peach, apricot, and myrica. Chicken, duck, goose, beef, pork, rabbit, sika deer, turtle dove, owl, Chinese bamboo partridge, magpie, common pheasant, crane, and various types of fish were commonly consumed meats.

The production of silk through sericulture was profitable for both small-time farmers and large-scale producers. Silk clothing was too expensive for the poor, who wore clothes most commonly made of hemp. The rural women usually wove all the family's clothes.

Common bronze items included domestic wares like oil lamps, incense burners, tables, irons, stoves, and dripping jars. Iron goods were often used for construction and farmwork, such as plowshares, pickaxes, spades, shovels, hoes, sickles, axes, adze, hammers, chisels, knives, saws, scratch awls, and nails. Iron was also used to make swords, halberds, arrowheads and scale armor for the military.

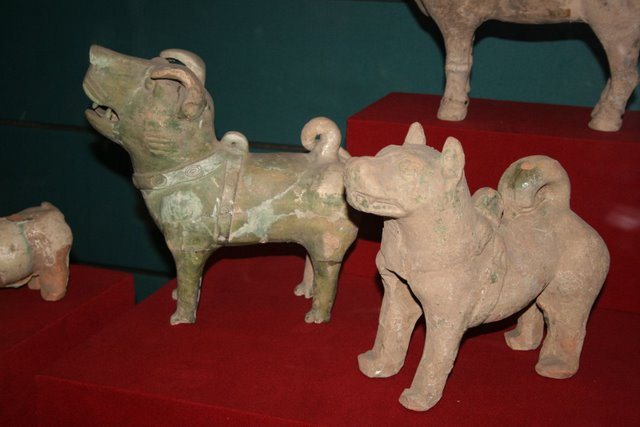
Although dog meat was eaten during the Han, dogs were also domesticated as pets. Most dogs were kept as pets, while specific types were bred for consumption.; these two Han tomb pottery dogs are wearing decorative dog collars.

Other common goods included: consumables (liquor, pickles and sauces, sheep and pigs, grain, yeast for fermentation, bean relish, dried fish and abalone, dates, chestnuts, fruits and vegetables), raw materials (cattle hide, boat timber, bamboo poles, dyes, horns, cinnabar, raw lacquer, jade, amber), clothing and clothing materials (silk fabrics, fine and coarse cloth, sable and foxskin garments, felt and mats, deerskin slippers), eating utensils (bronze utensils and chopsticks, silver, wood and iron vessels, ceramic wares), art objects (lacquerware, ceramics), elegant coffins (made of catalpa, locust, juniper, and lacquered wood), vehicles such as light two-wheeled carts and heavy oxcarts, and horses.

In addition to general commodities, Han historians list the goods of specific regions. Common trade items from the region of modern Shanxi included bamboo, timber, grain, and gemstones; Shandong had fish, salt, liquor, and silk; Jiangnan had camphor, catalpa, ginger, cinnamon, gold, tin, lead, cinnabar, rhinoceros horn, tortoise shell, pearls, ivory, and leather. Ebrey lists items found in a 2nd-century AD tomb in Wuwei, Gansu (along the Hexi Corridor fortified by the Great Wall of China), evidence that luxury items could be obtained even in remote frontiers.

... fourteen pieces of pottery; wooden objects such as a horse, pig, ox, chicken, chicken coop, and a single-horned animal; seventy copper cash; a crossbow mechanism made of bronze; a writing brush; a lacquer-encased inkstone; a lacquer tray and bowl; a wooden comb; a jade ornament; a pair of hemp shoes; a straw bag; the remains of an inscribed banner; a bamboo hairpin; two straw satchels; and a stone lamp.

=== Estate management and trade ===
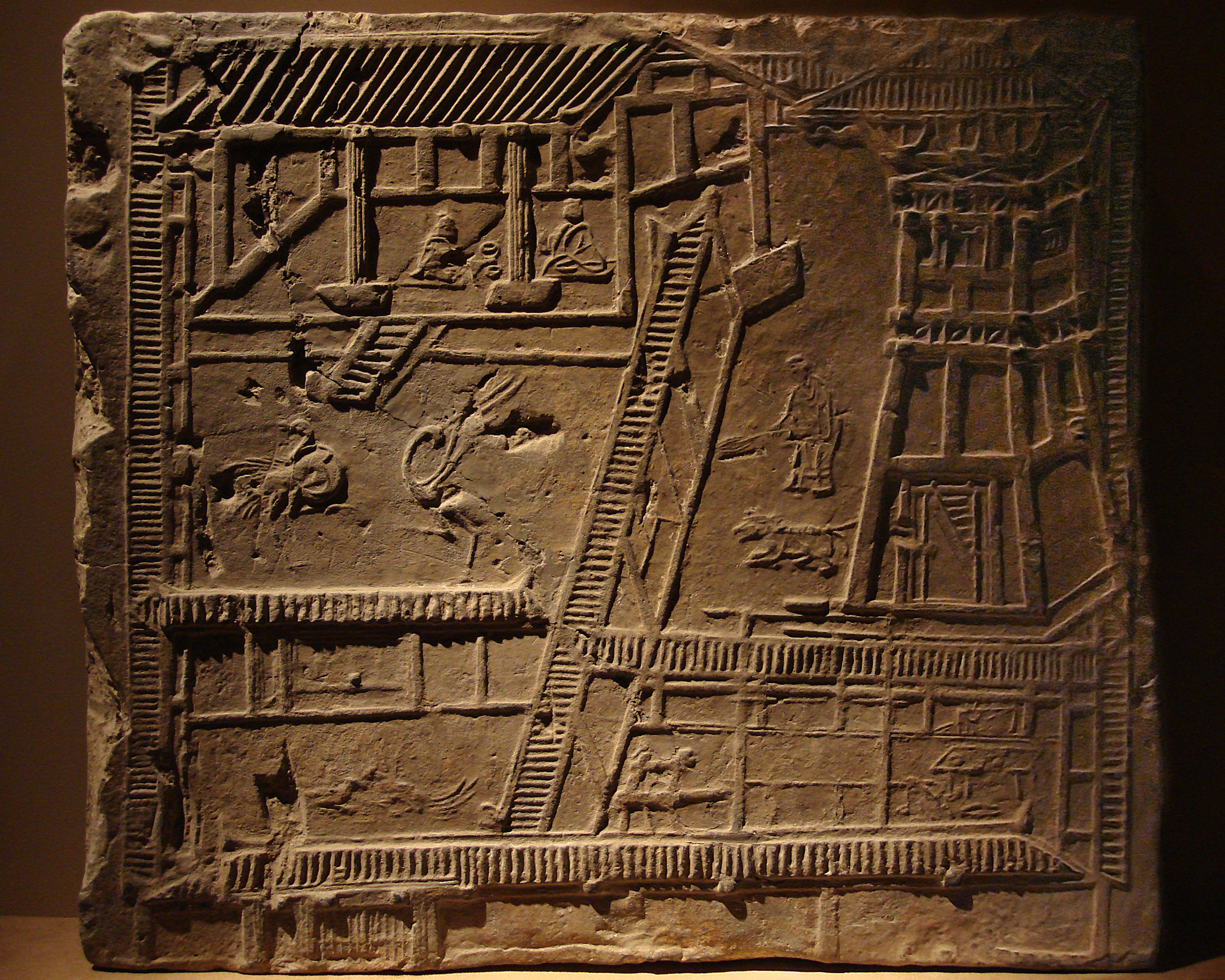
This incised Eastern-Han brick, from the chamber wall of a rich and powerful family's tomb in Chengdu, depicts the home of a wealthy, influential Han official; it features a walled courtyard, house, bedrooms, halls, kitchen, well, and a watchtower. The host and his guest sit and drink in the inner courtyard, while two roosters fight and two cranes dance.

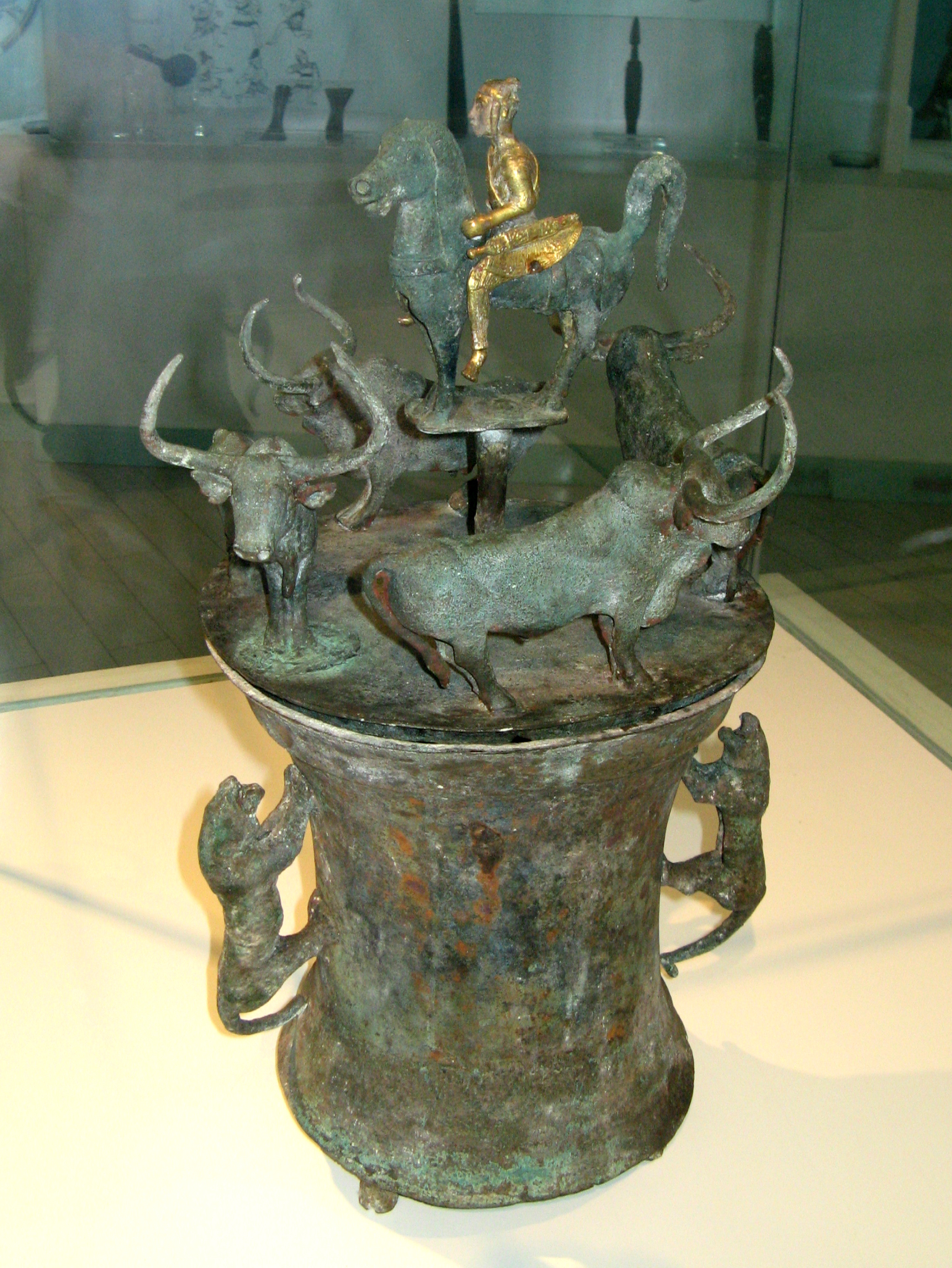
Bronze cowrie container, Western Han Dynasty (202 BC - 9 AD), Yunnan Provincial Museum, Kunming; cowrie shells were used as an early form of money in this region of China and were kept in elaborately decorated bronze containers such as this one, surmounted by a freestanding gilded horseman who is encircled by four oxen, that are approached in turn by two tigers climbing up on opposite sides of the container.

In the early Eastern Han, Emperor Ming passed laws which prohibited those involved in agriculture from simultaneously engaging in mercantile trade. These laws were largely ineffective, since wealthy landowners and landlords made significant profits from the trading of goods produced on their estates. Cui Shi (催寔) (d. 170 AD), a local commandery administrator who later served as an official in the central government's secretariat, started a winery business in his home to pay for his father's funeral. His fellow gentry criticized him, claiming the practice was immoral, but not illegal.

Cui Shi's book Sìmín yuèlìng (四民月令) is the only significant surviving work on agriculture from the Eastern Han period, though about 3,000 written characters of the Fan Shengzhi shu, dated to the reign of Emperor Cheng of Han (33–7 BC), still survive. Cui Shi's book provides descriptions of rituals for ancestor worship, festival and religious holiday celebrations, conduct for family and kinship relations, farmwork, and the schooling season for boys. Cui Shi's book also provides detailed instructions on which months were the most profitable times to buy and sell certain types of farm-produced goods.

The following table is modelled on Ebrey's "Estate and Family Management in the Later Han as Seen in the Monthly Instructions for the Four Classes of People" (1974). Ebrey writes: "... the same item was often bought and sold at different times of the year. The rationale for this is very clearly financial: items were bought when the price was low and sold when it was high." The specific amounts for each commodity traded are not listed, yet the timing of sale and purchase during the year is the most valuable information for historians. Missing from Cui Shi's list are important items which his family certainly bought and sold at specific times of the year, such as salt, iron farm tools and kitchen utensils, paper and ink (the papermaking process was invented by Cai Lun in 105 AD), as well as luxury items of silk and exotic foods.

Goods bought and sold throughout the year at the estate of Cui Shi (催寔)
Month of the year	Bought	Sold
2	Firewood and charcoal	Unhusked millet, glutinous millet, soya and lesser beans, hemp and wheat
3	Hempen cloth	glutinous millet
4	Huskless and regular barley, scrap silk wadding	
5	Huskless and regular barley, wheat, silk floss, hempen and silk cloth, straw	Soya and lesser beans, sesame
6	Huskless barley, wheat, thick and thin silk	Soya beans
7	Wheat and or barley, thick and thin silk	Soya and lesser beans
8	Leather shoes, glutinous millet	Seed wheat and or barley
10	Unhusked millet, soya and lesser beans and hemp seeds	Thick silk, silk, and silk floss
11	Non-glutinous rice, husked and unhusked millet, lesser beans and hemp seed	

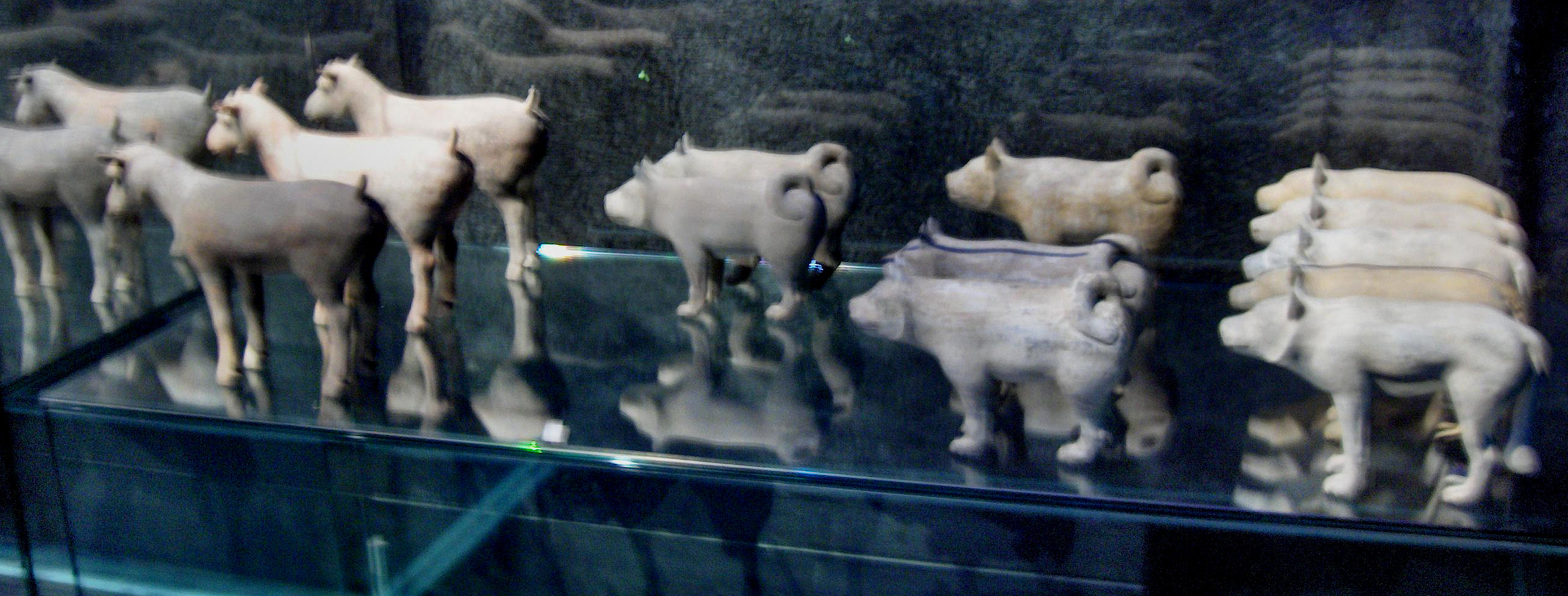
Ceramic pigs and oxen from a tomb of the Western Han Era

There was mass unemployment among landless peasants during the Eastern Han period. However, archaeological and literary evidence shows that those managing wealthy agricultural estates enjoyed great prosperity and lived comfortably. In addition to Cui's work, the inventor, mathematician, and court astronomer Zhang Heng (78–139 AD) wrote a rhapsody describing the rich countryside of Nanyang and its irrigated rice paddies. He mentions grain fields, ponds filled with fish, and estate gardens and orchards filled with bamboo shoots, autumn leeks, winter rape-turnips, perilla, evodia, and purple ginger.

Bricks lining the walls of the tombs of wealthy Han were adorned with carved or molded reliefs and painted murals; these often showed scenes of the tomb occupant's estate, halls, wells, carriage sheds, pens for cattle, sheep, chickens, and pigs, stables for horses, and employed workers picking mulberry leaves, plowing crop fields, and hoeing vegetable patches.

Small and medium-sized estates were managed by single families. The father acted as the head manager, the sons as field workers. Wives and daughters worked with female servants to weave cloth and produce silk. Very wealthy landowners who had a large peasant following often used a sharecropping system to similar to the government's system for state-owned lands. Under this system, peasants would receive land, tools, oxen, and a house in exchange for a third or a half of their crop yield.

== Foreign trade and tributary exchange ==
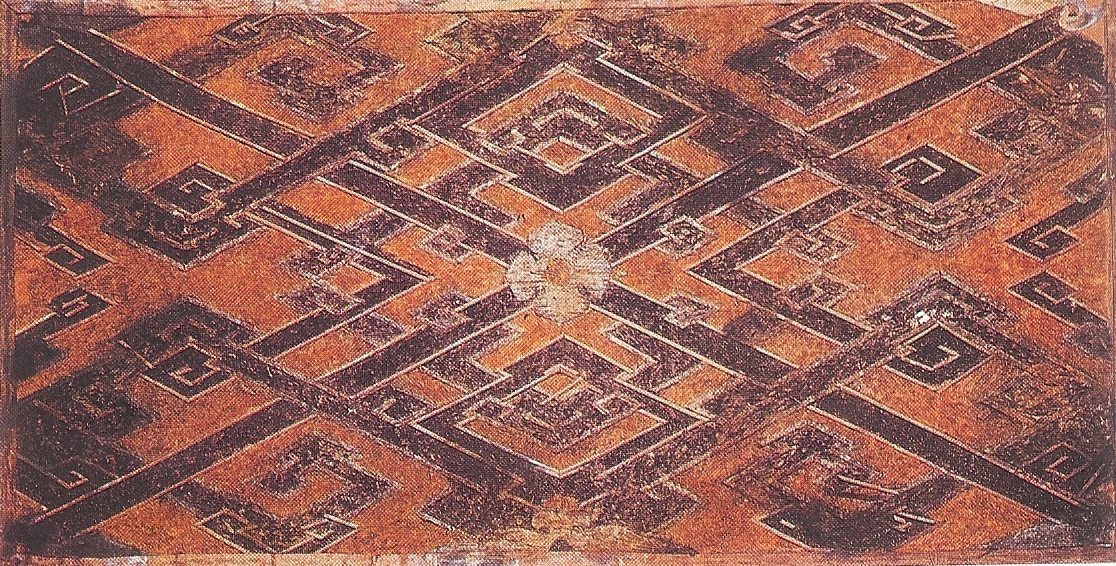
Woven silk textile from Tomb No. 1 at Mawangdui Han tombs site, Changsha, Hunan province, China, dated to the Western Han Era, 2nd century BC

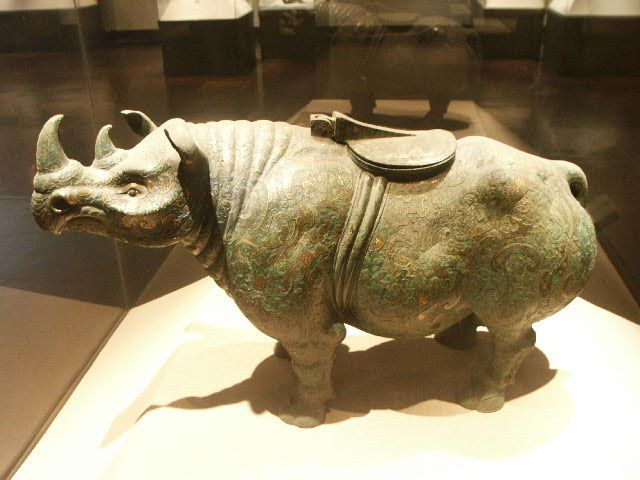
A bronze rhinoceros from the Western Han Era

Prior to the Han dynasty, markets close to China's northern border engaged in trade with the nomadic tribes of the eastern Eurasian Steppe. The heqin agreement between the Han and nomadic Xiongnu stipulated the transfer of tributary goods from China. The exact amount of annual tribute sent to the Xiongnu in the 2nd century BC is unknown. In 89 BC, when Hulugu Chanyu (狐鹿姑) (r. 95–85 BC) requested a renewal of the heqin agreement, he demanded an annual tribute of 400,000 litres (11,000 US bu) or 10,000 dan of wine, 100,000 litres (2,800 US bu) or 5,000 hu of grain, and 10,000 bales of silk. These amounts of wine, grain, and silk were considered to be a significant increase from earlier amounts of tribute, which must have been much less. Besides these arrangements, the most common commercial exchanges between the Xiongnu and Han merchants consisted of the trading of Xiongnu horses and furs for Han agricultural foodstuffs and luxury items, most notably silk. By means of the black market, the Xiongnu were also able to smuggle Han iron weapons across the border.

The Han established a diplomatic presence in the Tarim Basin of Central Asia during Emperor Wu of Han's reign (141–87 BC). Han envoys brought gifts of sheep, gold, and silk to the urban oasis city-states. The Chinese sometimes used gold as currency; however, silk was favored as a means to pay for food and lodging. Once the Han had subjugated the Tarim Basin and established a Protectorate there, Han envoys in these states were given free food and lodging. These envoys were required to send tributary items of furs, precious stones, and delicacies such as Central Asian raisins to the Han court. The Arsacid court sent exotic animals including lions and ostriches to the Han court, and a king ruling in what is now Burma sent elephants and rhinoceroses. Han diplomatic missions to royal courts across Asia were usually accompanied by trade caravans which earned substantial profits.

The Han court received tributary submission from the Xiongnu leader Huhanye (呼韓邪) (r. 58–31 BC), an important rival to Zhizhi Chanyu (r. 56–36 BC, died at the Battle of Zhizhi). Huhanye's tribute, exchange of hostages, and presence at Chang'an in the New Year of 51 BC were rewarded with the following gifts from the emperor: 5 kg (160 ozt) of gold, 200,000 coins, 77 suits of clothes, 8,000 bales of silk fabric, 1,500 kg (3,300 lb) of silk floss, 15 horses, and 680,000 L (19,000 US bu) of grain. However, this is the only occurrence of rewarded gifts that present materials other than fabric. As shown in the table below, based upon Yü Ying-shih's "Han Foreign Relations" (1986), the gifts consisted only silk after 51 BC, and the Xiongnu leader's political submission was guaranteed only for as long as the Han could provide him with ever-greater amounts of imperial largesse of silk with each succeeding visit to the Chinese court.

Imperial Han gifts received by the Xiongnu Chanyu during trips of homage to the Han court in Chang'an
Year (BC)	Silk floss (measured in catties)	Silk fabric (measured in bales)
51	1,500	8,000
49	2,000	9,000
33	4,000	18,000
25	5,000	20,000
1	7,500	30,000

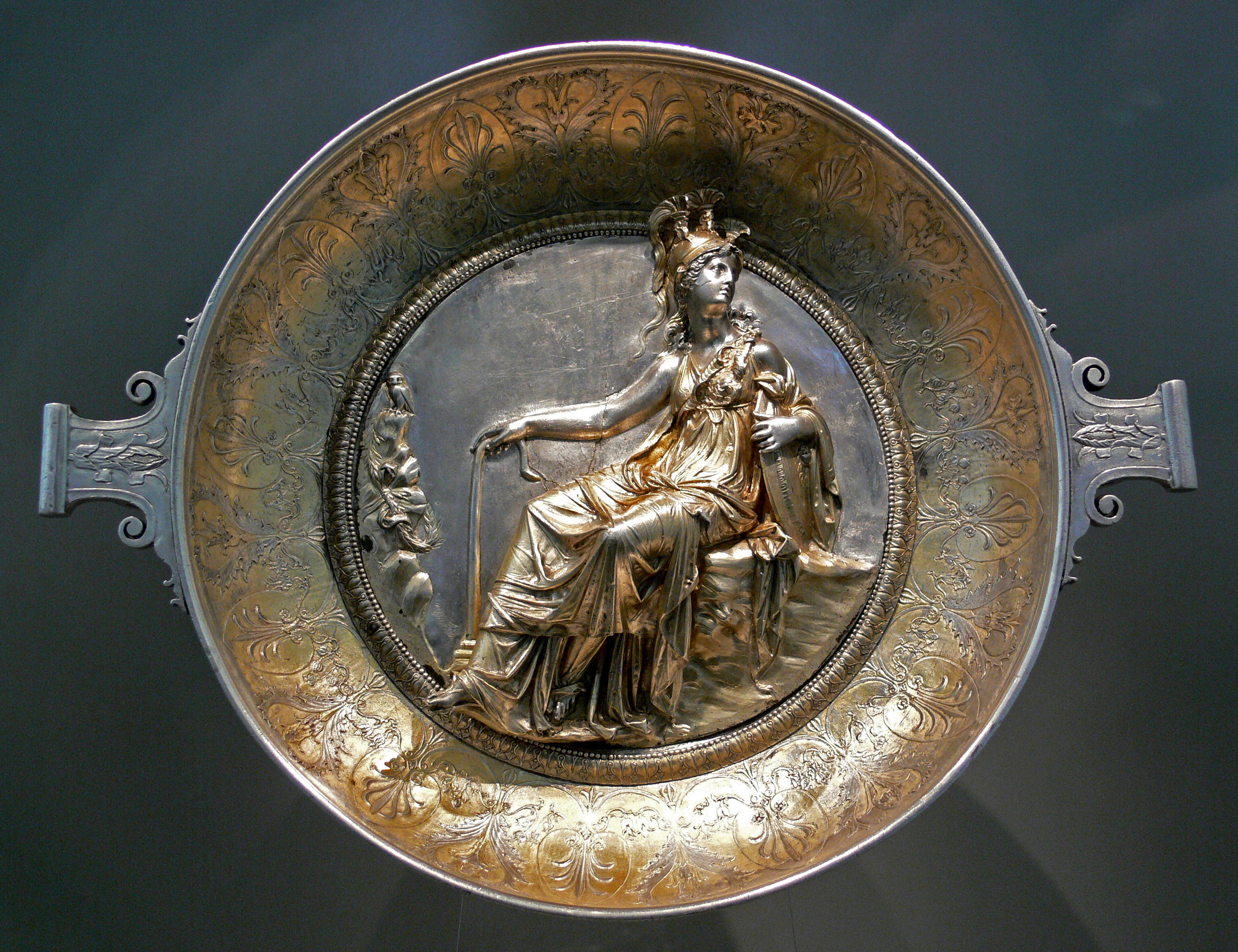
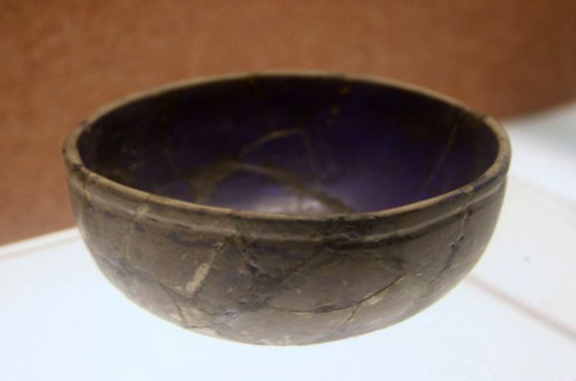
Left image: Minerva on a Roman gilt-silver plate, 1st century BC; a similar Roman gilt-silver plate found in Jingyuan County, Gansu province, China, dated 2nd or 3rd century AD had a raised relief image of the Greco-Roman god Dionysos.
Right image: A Western-Han blue-glass bowl; although the Chinese had been making glass bead items since the Spring and Autumn period (722–481 BC), the first Chinese glasswares (such as bowls and bottles) appeared during Western Han.

The establishment of the Silk Road occurred during Wu's reign, owing to the efforts of the diplomat Zhang Qian. The increased demand for silk from the Roman Empire stimulated commercial traffic in both Central Asia and across the Indian Ocean. Roman merchants sailed to Barbarikon near present-day Karachi, Pakistan, and Barygaza in present-day Gujarat, India to purchase Chinese silks (see Roman trade with India). When Emperor Wu conquered Nanyue—in what is now Southwest China and northern Vietnam—in 111 BC, overseas trade was extended to Southeast Asia and the Indian Ocean, as maritime merchants traded Han gold and silk for pearls, jade, lapis lazuli, and glasswares.

The Book of Later Han states that Roman envoys sent by Emperor Marcus Aurelius (r. 161–180 AD), following a southern route, brought gifts to the court of Emperor Huan of Han (r. 146–168 AD) in 166 AD. This Roman mission followed an unsuccessful attempt by the Han diplomat Gan Ying to reach Rome in 97. Gan Ying was delayed at the Persian Gulf, by Arsacid authorities, and could only make a report on Rome based on oral accounts. Historians Charles Hucker and Rafe de Crespigny both speculate that the Roman mission of 166 AD involved enterprising Roman merchants instead of actual diplomats; Hucker writes:

Tributary missions from vassal states were commonly allowed to include traders, who thus gained opportunities to do business in the capital markets. No doubt a large proportion of what the Chinese court chose to call tributary missions were in fact shrewdly organized commercial ventures by foreign merchants with no diplomatic status at all. This was unquestionably the case, most notably, with a group of traders who appeared on the south coast in 166 AD claiming to be envoys from the Roman emperor Marcus Aurelius Antoninus.

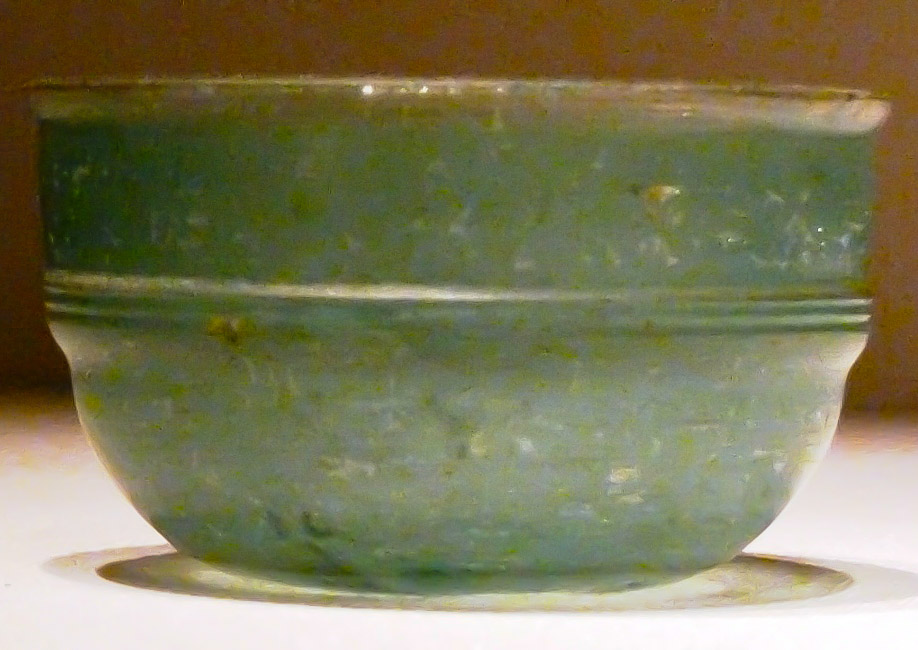
A green Roman glass cup unearthed from an Eastern Han Dynasty (25-220 AD) tomb, Guangxi, China

The main trade route leading into Han China passed first through Kashgar, yet Hellenized Bactria further west was the central node of international trade. By the 1st century AD, Bactria and much of Central Asia and North India were controlled by the Kushan Empire. Silk was the main export item from China to India. Indian merchants brought various goods to China, including tortoise shell, gold, silver, copper, iron, lead, tin, fine cloth, woolen textiles, perfume and incense, crystal sugar, pepper, ginger, salt, coral, pearls, glass items, and Roman wares. Indian merchants brought Roman styrax and frankincense to China, while the Chinese knew bdellium as a fragrant item from Persia, although it was native to West India. The tall Ferghana horses imported from Fergana were highly prized in Han China. The newly introduced exotic Central Asian grapes (i.e. vitis vinifera) were used to make grape wine, although the Chinese had rice wine before this. Glass luxury items from ancient Mesopotamia have been found in Chinese tombs and dated to the late Spring and Autumn period (771–476 BC). Roman glasswares have been found in Chinese tombs dating to the early 1st century BC, with the earliest specimen found at the southern Chinese seaport of Guangzhou. Silverwares from Roman- and Arsacid territories have also been found at Han tomb sites.

== See also ==
- Economy of East Asia
- Economic history of China before 1912
- Economy of the Song dynasty
- Economy of the Ming dynasty
- Economy of the Qing dynasty
- Population history of China
- Taxation in premodern China
