= Nine Regrets =

"Nine Regrets" (traditional Chinese: 九懷; simplified Chinese: 九怀; pinyin: Jiǔ huái or Jiǔ Huái; lit. 'nine regrets" or "nine Huai (verses)') is the 11th of the 17 major sections of the ancient Chinese poetry collection Chu ci, also known as The Songs of the South or The Songs of Chu. The "Nine Regrets" consists of nine verses plus an envoi (luan), each individually titled, written according to the Han dynasty literary revival style based upon the earlier (pre-Han) pieces in the Chu ci anthology. The "Nine Regrets" is one of the several collections of poems grouped under the title of "Nine" something-or-others, which do not necessarily consist of 9 pieces of poetry. Nine Regrets consists of nine main pieces plus a luan, or envoi (Hawkes, 2011 [1985]: 36-37 and 269–280). The "Nine Regrets" poems are attributed to the Shu poet Wang Bao (Chinese: 王褒; pinyin: Wáng Bāo) who flourished during the reign of Emperor Xuan (r. 74 BCE – BCE 49). (Hawkes, 2011 [1985]: 269–270)

== Title ==
The Han era literary revival of the Chu ci style of poetry included the use of many historical allusions to the past events related to events which occurred during the existence of the Kingdom of Chu, which had been annexed by the state of Qin in BCE 223. These are events which are alluded to in the older Chu ci pieces, especially the Li Sao, which included the relationship between the "loyal minister" Qu Yuan who was "slandered at court", and thus, "lost the favor of his lord", King Huai of Chu. The Chinese characters in the title of the "Nine Regrets", in their traditional form are 九懷. In modern Chinese the character 九 means the quantity of 9, whereas anciently 九 was used more symbolically, representing some quality of 9: in this case a reference to the older sections of the Chu ci, such as the "Jiu Ge" (or, "Nine Songs"), which itself consists of 11 verses. The character 懷 may refer to huái, meaning "regret"; but, it is also the posthumous name used for King Huai of Chu (his given name, also Huai, was represented by the character 槐).

== Contents ==
The contents of Nine Regrets consist of nine main pieces plus a luan (envoi):

- I Release from Worldly Contrivings (Kuang ji)
- II A Road to Beyond (Tong lu)
- III Dangerous Heights (Wei jun)
- IV A Light on the World (Zhao shi)
- V Honouring the Good (Zun jia)
- VI Stored Blossoms (Xu ying)
- VII Thoughts on Loyalty Bent (Si zhong)
- VIII Raising Barriers (Tao yong)
- IX Quenching the Light (Zhu zhao)
- X Luan (envoi)

== See also ==
- Chuci
- List of Chuci contents
- Qu Yuan
