= Pentina =

Poetic form

The pentina is an accentual-syllabic poetic form, characterized by the use of five verses of five lines each, with a two-line envoi, for a total of 27 lines. It is similar to the French form, the sestina, which is characterized by six verses of six lines each, with a final 3-line envoi. Its creation in 1995 by American poet and songwriter Leigh Harrison was documented in an article, "The Joys of the Pentina" (Medicinal Purposes Literary Review, Vol. II, No. XII, published in 2005). The Pentina form is also described in Lewis Turco's "The Book of Forms / Odd and Invented Forms" which was published in 2011 in the U.S.

The pentina, like the sestina, does not utilize rhyme, but relies on the use of repeated end-words (properly called "teleutons"), picked up and re-used in each succeeding stanza, with variations in the order. The repeating pattern of the teleutons, as with those of the sestina, have no mathematical or numerical significance, but they have a spatial logic: bottom end-word, top end-word, one word up from bottom, one word up from top, middle end-word. The final two-line envoi uses the repeated end-words so that either two are in the first, and three in the third, or three in the first and two in the third, with the poet choosing the preferred style. The set pattern of the repeated teleutons works as follows:

Verse 1: a b c d e

Verse 2: e a d b c

Verse 3: c e b a d

Verse 4: d c a e b

Verse 5: b d e c a

Envoi:

 a  b  c    
    d  e

or:

    a  b
 c  d  e
