= Chant royal =

Poetic form

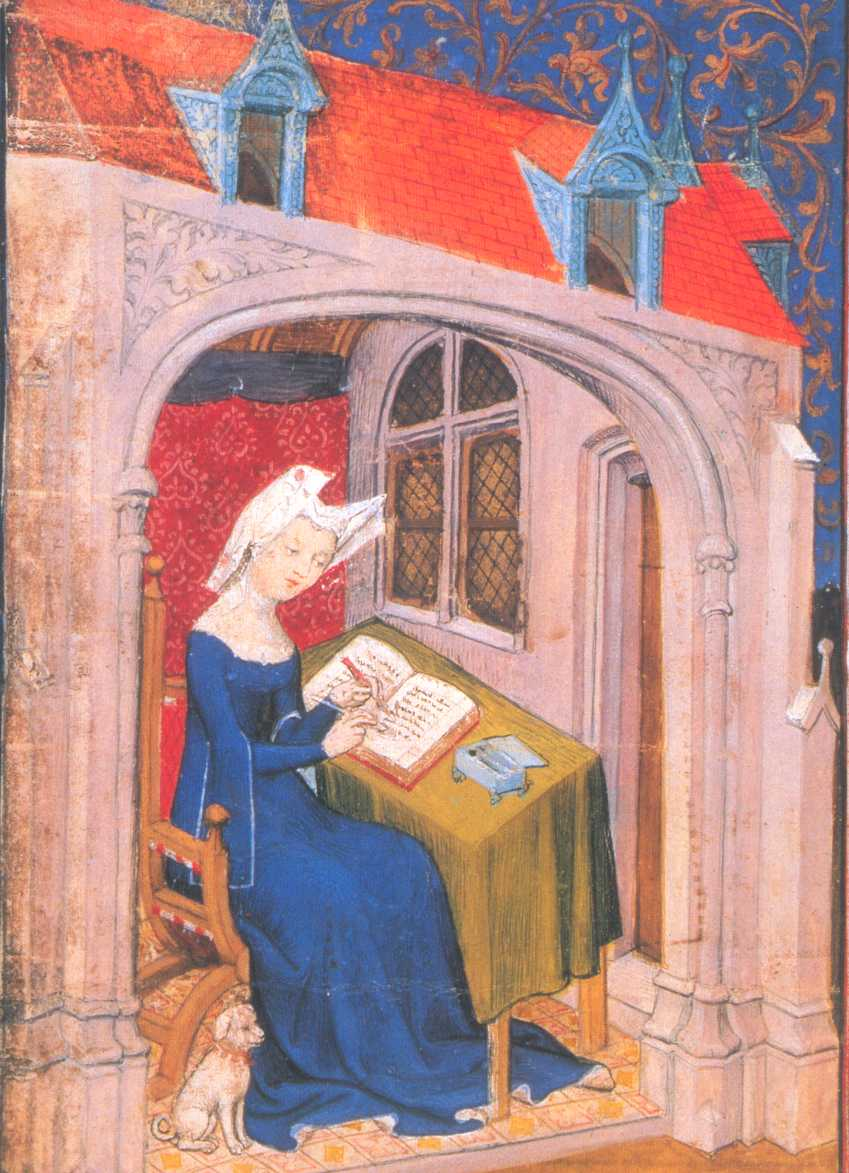
Christine de Pisan, one of the form’s creators

Chant royal is a complex fixed verse poetic form originating in medieval France. It is a poetic form that is a variation of the ballad form and consists of five eleven-line stanzas with a rhyme scheme $\mathrm{ababccddedE}$ and a five-line envoi rhyming $\mathrm{ddedE}$ or a seven-line envoi $\mathrm{ccddedE}$ (capital letters indicate lines repeated verbatim). To add to the complexity, no rhyming word is used twice. It was introduced into French poetry in the 15th century by Christine de Pizan and Charles d'Orléans and was introduced to England towards the end of the 19th century as part of a general revival of interest in French poetic forms. The complexity of the form caused William Caswell Jones to describe it as "impractical" for common use. The chant royal was considered one of the most complicated poetic forms in Northern France (langue d’oïl regions) during the 15th century, though not as complex as the sestina, which was more popular in Southern France (Occitan regions). The form was often used for stately or heroic subjects.

== An example ==
The Dance of Death
After Holbein
"Contra vim Mortis
Non est medicamen in hortis."

He is the despots' Despot. All must bide,
Later or soon, the message of his might;
Princes and potentates their heads must hide,
Touched by the awful sigil of his right;
Beside the Kaiser he at eve doth wait
And pours a potion in his cup of state;
The stately Queen his bidding must obey;
No keen-eyed Cardinal shall him affray;
And to the Dame that wantoneth he saith--
"Let be, Sweet-heart, to junket and to play."
There is no King more terrible than Death.

The lusty Lord, rejoicing in his pride,
He draweth down; before the armed Knight
With jingling bridle-rein he still doth ride;
He crosseth the strong Captain in the fight;
The Burgher grave he beckons from debate;
He hales the Abbot by his shaven pate,
Nor for the Abbess' wailing will delay;
No bawling Mendicant shall say him nay;
E'en to the pyx the Priest he followeth,
Nor can the Leech* his chilling finger stay . . . [doctor]
There is no King more terrible than Death.

All things must bow to him. And woe betide
The Wine-bibber,--the Roisterer by night;
Him the feast-master, many bouts defied,
Him 'twixt the pledging and the cup shall smite;
Woe to the Lender at usurious rate,
The hard Rich Man, the hireling Advocate;
Woe to the Judge that selleth Law for pay;
Woe to the Thief that like a beast of prey
With creeping tread the traveller harryeth:--
These, in their sin, the sudden sword shall slay . . .
There is no King more terrible than Death.

He hath no pity, – nor will be denied.
When the low hearth is garnished and bright,
Grimly he flingeth the dim portal wide,
And steals the Infant in the Mother's sight;
He hath no pity for the scorned of fate:--
He spares not Lazarus lying at the gate,
Nay, nor the Blind that stumbleth as he may;
Nay, the tired Ploughman,--at the sinking ray,--
In the last furrow,--feels an icy breath,
And knows a hand hath turned the team astray . . .
There is no King more terrible than Death.

He hath no pity. For the new-made Bride,
Blithe with the promise of her life's delight,
That wanders gladly by her Husband's side,
He with the clatter of his drum doth fright.
He scares the Virgin at the convent grate;
The Maid half-won, the Lover passionate;
He hath no grace for weakness and decay:
The tender Wife, the Widow bent and gray,
The feeble Sire whose footstep faltereth,--
All these he leadeth by the lonely way . . .
There is no King more terrible than Death.

Envoi
Youth, for whose ear and monishing of late,
I sang of Prodigals and lost estate,
Have thou thy joy of living and be gay;
But know not less that there must come a day,--
Aye, and perchance e'en now it hasteneth,--
When thine own heart shall speak to thee and say,--
There is no King more terrible than Death.

—Austin Dobson
