= Wang Bao =

- Chinese: 王褒
Transcriptions
Standard Mandarin
- Hanyu Pinyin: Wáng Bāo
- Gwoyeu Romatzyh: Wang Bau
- Wade–Giles: Wang^{2} Pao^{1}
- IPA: [wǎŋ páʊ]
Yue: Cantonese
- Yale Romanization: Wòhng Bōu
- Jyutping: Wong^{4} Bou^{1}
- IPA: [wɔŋ˩ pɔw˥]
Southern Min
- Tâi-lô: Ông Po

Wang Bao (c. 84 – c. 53 BCE), courtesy name Ziyuan (子淵), was a Chinese poet during the Western Han dynasty. He was well versed in the Classical Chinese poetry tradition. He was involved in the Chu Ci poetry revival which took place in the second part of Emperor Xuan's reign, and which led to the creation of poetry that would eventually form part of the early poetry anthology by the same name, compiled by Wang Yi. Chu Ci means "literature of Chu", Chu being the area of a former independent kingdom, located in what was from the viewpoint of the Han dynasty the south of China. Wang Bao is particularly known today as the author of the Chu Ci section "Nine Regrets". His poetry was not as famous as "Li Sao" or "Heavenly Questions". Indeed, sometimes Qu Yuan has been credited as the author of his poetry (as have all the Chu Ci contents) . Wang Bao's works were included in one of the two major early anthologies of Chinese poetry which has helped to secure Wang Bao's legacy as a poet and author. Wang Bao became famous during the reign of Han dynasty emperor Emperor Xuan (r. 74 BCE – 49 BCE), and he attended the courts of the emperor and the prince, his presumptive heir.

== Biography ==
=== Early years ===
Wang Bao was a native of Ziyang, in Sichuan: the Sichuan area was then known as Shu and was one of the remote parts of the territory of the Han Empire. One of Wang Bao's songs incorporating lyrics which he wrote by commission from a local official in praise of the Han government and which were then set to music was eventually performed for emperor Xuan, who quite enjoyed the performance, particularly the lyrics, and summoned Wang by imperial command to attend him at court . He was received as a court poet, with an honorary position as a government officer (with a nominal title but real salary), and where his continued literary success at the imperial court derived from his exercise of his talent for combining lyricism and flattery.

=== Attending the emperor ===
While at the court, the poems of the Chuci style returned to fashion for some years, a revival in which Wang Bao was a participant. Wang was assigned to cheer up the heir apparent who was suffering from depression, reciting his writings until the prince felt better: most successful in this regard were a couple of his fu (or rhapsodies, as they are sometimes known), "The Flute" and "The Ganquan Palace": the fu on the Ganquan Palace (traditional Chinese: 甘泉宮; simplified Chinese: 甘泉宫; pinyin: Gānquán gōng; lit. 'Sweet (or, Tasty) Springs Palace') was written about the Summer resort favoured by Emperor Wu and other emperors of the Han. The actual Ganquan palace was located in what is now Chunhua County, of Xianyang region, Shaanxi province, China: the site of its remains are one of the Major National Historical and Cultural Sites of Shaanxi.

=== Death ===
However, after a few years he was ordered back to Shu, upon reports that a green rooster and a golden horse had appeared in the hills or mountains near Yizhou. While on his mission, assigned by Xuandi to bring the alleged golden horse to the capital, Wang became ill and died, to Xuandi's sorrow. Wang Bao was a contemporary of Liu Xiang; however, specific biographic dates for him are not available through the known surviving historical records, but the period in which he wrote the Chuci pieces should be between 60 and 50 BCE.

== Works ==
Wang Bao wrote the "Nine Regrets", consisting of nine poems in the "Song (Shijing)" style, plus a luan (envoi), which were incorporated into the Chu ci anthology, as its 11th section. Wang Bao is also known for writing in the fu style, which was particularly popular during the Han dynasty. "The Slave's Contract" is an example of humorous writing, in which Wang Bao somewhat cruelly pretends to propose the purchase of a certain irascible old slave, presenting an extended account of the onerous list of duties to which the slave would then be responsible to perform.

== See also ==
- Chu ci
- Fu (poetry)
- List of Chuci contents
- Liu Xiang (scholar)
- Nine Regrets
- Qu Yuan
- Shu (state)
- Wang Yi (librarian)
