= Zhao Chongguo =

Chinese general (137–52 BC)

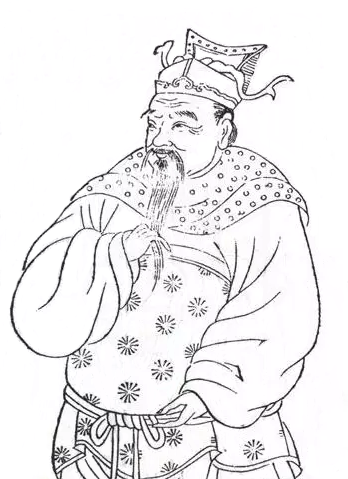
- 1830 depiction of Zhao
- Born: 137 BCE; Shanggui, Longxi Commandery, Han China
- Died: 52 BCE (aged 84 or 85)
- Children: Zhao Ang
- Relatives: Zhao Yu (father)
- Military career
- Allegiance: Han dynasty
- Service years: c. 115–60 BCE
- Wars: Han–Xiongnu Wars; Qiang campaign (62–60 BCE)

Zhao Chongguo
- Traditional Chinese: 趙充國
- Simplified Chinese: 赵充国
Transcriptions
Standard Mandarin
- Hanyu Pinyin: Zhào Chōngguó
- Wade–Giles: Chao^{4} Ch'ung^{1}-kuo^{2}
- IPA: [ʈʂâʊ ʈʂʰʊ́ŋ.kwǒ]
Middle Chinese
- Middle Chinese: /ɖˠiᴇu^{X} t͡ɕʰɨuŋ.kwək̚/

Courtesy name
- Traditional Chinese: 翁孫
- Simplified Chinese: 翁孙
- Literal meaning: the old man's grandson
Transcriptions
Standard Mandarin
- Hanyu Pinyin: Wēngsūn
- Wade–Giles: Weng^{1}-sun^{1}

Zhao Chongguo (Chinese: 趙充國; pinyin: Zhào Chōngguó, 137 BCE – 52 BCE) was a Chinese military commander and official during the Western Han dynasty. Born to a family of officials in what is now eastern Gansu, Zhao studied military science in his youth. Around 100 BCE, he joined the Feathered Forest, a recently-created elite cavalry unit recruited from the northwestern districts. He joined General Li Guangli's campaign against the Xiongnu confederation the following year, and was severely wounded in combat. Emperor Wu, impressed by Zhao's service, promoted him. He served as chief of staff for the supreme head of cavalry units. In 80 BCE, Zhao was appointed to manage the imperial parks, and also controlled the minting of cash coinage.

In 74 BCE, Zhao collaborated with the political leader Huo Guang to depose the newly enthroned emperor Liu He in favor of Emperor Xuan. For this, he was appointed Marquis of Yingping and was promoted to General of the Rear. After participating in conflicts against the Xiongnu, he volunteered to lead a campaign against the Qiang people (in what is now Qinghai) in 62 BCE. Joined by his son, he succeeded in pushing deep into Qiang territory, and exploited tribal divisions by granting amnesty to the Qiang who defected to the Han forces. Zhao rejected proposals by his fellow generals and the emperor to continue offensive operations, believing that a protracted occupation would subdue the Qiang through attrition. He was able to implement his policy of tuntian (lit. 'farming garrisons'), although the emperor simultaneously approved offensive operations by other generals. Zhao's garrison technique proved successful, gaining him acclaim and influence on later strategists. He retired in 60 BCE after his son created a scandal and committed suicide. Zhao's life and career is known mainly through a biography in the Book of Han.

== Early life and career ==
In 137 BCE, Zhao Chongguo was born in Shanggui Prefecture in Longxi Commandery, located along the western periphery of the Western Han dynasty (in what is now Tianshui in eastern Gansu). A stele erected for a member of his family in 180 CE claims the family originated as a branch of the ruling family of Zhao State during the Warring States period. His great-grandfather, Zhao Zhongkuang, was the privy treasurer (少府; shǎofǔ) under Emperor Wen and Emperor Jing. Zhongkuang's son, Zhao Sheng, served as an advisory counselor (諫議大夫; jiànyì dàfū) in the Imperial Court. Sheng's son Zhao Yu, Zhao Chongguo's father, served as a palace attendant, but committed some grave offense and was exiled to Shanggui.

Little is known about Zhao's early life or military experience before he joined the Feathered Forest (羽林; yǔlín) cavalry unit around 100 BCE. Posthumous histories report that he was ambitious as a youth and sought to become a general. The "Six Commanderies", (Note: The "Six Commanderies" are the six administrative divisions along the northwestern frontier of the Han. They comprise Longxi, Tianshui, Anding, Beidi, Shang, and Xihe commanderies.) including Longxi, had a regional tradition of cavalry service within the Han military. Zhao studied military science and the Four Barbarians. He likely began service as a cavalryman in a local defense unit and became known as a 'Son of the Respectable Families of the Six Commanderies' (六郡良家子; liùjùn liángjiāzǐ), (Note: A 3rd century CE scholar, Ru Shun, defined "respectable families" as those not involved with medicine, magic, trade, or the manufacture of handicrafts.) a group many noted Han generals originated in. He was granted the courtesy name Wengsun, 'the old man's grandson'; the meaning behind this is unknown. At some point, Zhao moved to Lingju County in Jincheng Commandery (in what is now Yongdeng County in central Gansu). His move was likely connected to his military service; Lingju had recently fallen under Han control during the campaigns against the Qiang people.

== Military service ==
In 104 BC, an elite cavalry unit named the Feathered Forest was created in the imperial capital of Chang'an, one of five units placed under the administration of the Minister of the Imperial Household and tasked with protecting the Emperor. The members of the unit, dubbed the "Gentlemen of the Feathered Forest" (羽林郎; yǔlínláng), were mainly recruited from the northwest, with a particular emphasis on the descendants of men who died in military. Zhao joined the unit around 100. In 99, he joined a force of 30,000 cavalry in General Li Guangli's campaign against the Xiongnu to the north, receiving the rank of acting major. The Han army was forced to retreat and suffered heavy casualties. It eventually became trapped by the encroaching Xiongnu forces after several days of combat. Zhao led a group of around 100 men to breach the Xiongnu lines and allow for the rest of the Han army to retreat, suffering twenty sword cuts in the process. After General Li commended Zhao's service, Emperor Wu invited Zhao to a private meeting to see his battle wounds; he was so impressed that he promoted Wu to the rank of Gentleman of the Household (中郎; zhōngláng).

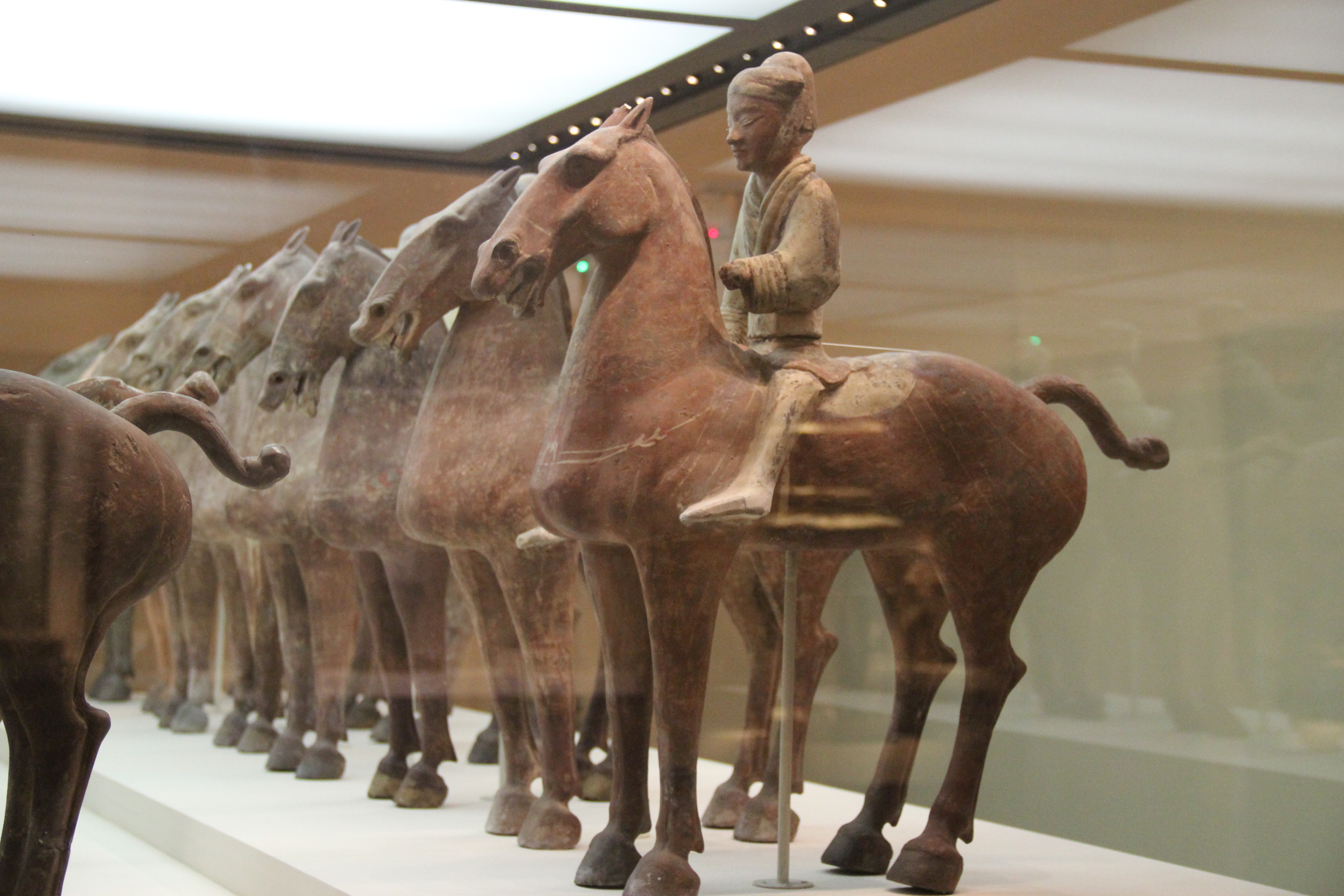
Ceramic models of cavalry from the early Han period

Zhao was soon promoted again, becoming chief of staff for the General of Chariots and Cavalry (車騎將軍; jūjì jiāngjūn) — and likely Grand General Huo Guang — and progressed rapidly during Huo's succeeding dictatorship. (Note: Grand General Huo Guang, the nephew of Wei Qing and Empress Wei Zifu, ruled as a dictator from the death of Emperor Wu in 87 BC to his death in 68 BC.) In 80 BC, Zhao led an army against the Di people, who had rebelled in Wudu Commandery in what is now southeastern Gansu. During this campaign, he held the title of Army Protector Chief Commandant (護軍都尉; hùjūn dūwèi), probably an advisory position to the Grand General. He was then sent to command the garrisons of Shanggu Commandery (in modern-day Inner Mongolia), possibly only as a brief inspection.

Later in 80 BC, Zhao was appointed as the Chief Commandant of Waters and Parks (水衡都尉; shuǐhéng dūwèi), a position he held until 60 BCE. As the chief commandant, he managed the Shanglin Park to the north of the capital. This position also allowed him to administrate the minting of cash coinage, as the central mint was located inside the park. By 74 BC, Zhao was joined in this position by the General of the Van (前將軍; qián jiāngjūn), Han Zeng. In August 74 BC, Zhao collaborated with Huo to depose the newly enthroned emperor Liu He, who was seen as indulgent and unfit for the office by several officials. Zhao signed the deed of indictment against the emperor alongside the Imperial Counselor and Han Zeng, and Emperor Xuan (a great-grandson of Emperor Wu) was installed in his place. Around two hundred officials, charged with assisting with the excesses of Liu He's brief rule, were executed. Huo Guang's rule continued after the coup.

In reward for his service in the coup, Zhao was awarded the hereditary title of Marquis of Yingping (營平侯; yíngpíng hóu). Around this time, he was promoted to General of the Rear (水衡都尉; hòu jiāngjūn), alongside his concurrent civil post as the chief commandant. From 72 BC to 71 BC, Zhao was one of five Han generals who participated in a large cavalry campaign against the Xiongnu at the request of the Wusun people of the northwest. During the campaign, he was titled the General of Pulei (蒲類都尉; púlèi jiāngjūn). (Note: Likely referring to a location near Barkol Lake as a military objective of the campaign.) Following a massive raid into Shanxi in 70 BC, a defected Xiongnu commander advised the Han army to place Zhao, who had reportedly become infamous among the Xiongnu, in command of the northern frontier commanderies. The Xiongnu forces retreated the following year. Huo Guang died two years later, and the Huo family was overthrown in favor of direct rule by Emperor Xuan. Zhao remained in the good graces of the imperial government.

== Campaign against the Qiang ==
Preventing contact and alliances between the pastoralist Western Qiang people and the Xiongnu had been a geopolitical goal of the Han since the reign of Emperor Wu, and was a major motivator for the conquest of the Hexi Corridor. During the mid-60s, a chieftain of the Xianlian tribe of the Western Qiang requested permission to pasture their herds in the Huangshui Valley, from where they had previously been expelled. Zhao was angered after this proposal was relayed positively to the Han court by the emissary Yiqu Anguo, accusing the Qiang of merely seeking contact with the Xiongnu and recommending a preemptive attack. The Han government's official response to the proposal is unknown, but the local garrison was unable to prevent the Qiang resettlement in the region.

In 63 BC, the chief of the Xianlian joined a large group of Western Qiang chieftains in suspending local feuds and forming an alliance. Zhao counseled Emperor Xuan on the matter, describing a unified Qiang as a particular threat to the Han, and predicting that the Xiongnu would imminently seek to ally with them. He felt that such a unification could be prevented by Han influence, writing "It is relatively easy to bring the Qiang under control because they are divided into many warlike tribes and always attack each other. It is not in their nature to become unified."

In 62 BC, the Han became aware that the Qiang lord Langhe had sent envoys to the Xiongnu, seeking to join in an alliance to attack the city of Dunhuang and the region of Shanshan in the western deserts. Sensing an imminent attack, Zhao advocated for the officer Xin Wuxian, the Grand Administrator of Jiuquan, to be sent into Qiang territory as part of a punitive expedition. Instead, the Chancellor and Imperial Secretary sent Yiqu Anguo into Qiang territory, ostensibly for diplomatic purposes. His brutal campaign caused widespread resentment, and more Qiang tribes rose up in revolt. He was forced to retreat back into Han territory.

=== Leading the campaign ===
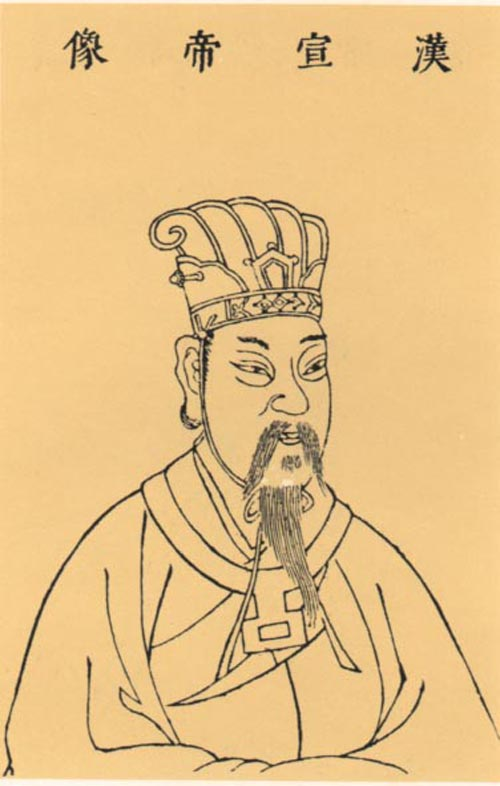
17th-century depiction of Emperor Xuan of Han

Emperor Xuan sent Imperial Secretary Bing Ji to consult Zhao on the leadership of an ensuing relief expedition. Although now in his seventies, Zhao convinced the imperial leadership that his experience made him the most capable leader for the expedition. He joined a group of around 10,000 cavalry troops mobilized at Jincheng Commandery. The army departed west along the Yellow River in April or May 61 BC, seeking to make a crossing to the northern bank east of the confluence with the Huangshui River. During the night, Zhao sent three regiments to cross and construct field fortifications along the northern bank to protect the rest of the army. This vanguard was attacked by a small group of Qiang horsemen shortly after. Suspecting a possible ambush, he withdrew his forces and sent a party to scout a highly defensible location along the river known as the Siwang Narrows. (Note: The Siwang Narrows are without a clear identification, but are downstream from Ledu.) When no Qiang forces were found at the narrows, the army traveled along the Huangshui through Luodu (now Ledu) and rested for several days at the fort of Longzhi, southeast of modern Xining.

Shortly before Zhao's arrival at Longzhi, a Qiang emissary named Diaoku from the Kai tribe was detained at the fort. Zhao declared him innocent and sent him as a messenger to the Qiang, promising amnesty and large monetary rewards for Qiang who decapitate those in the rebellion. They would also be rewarded with ownership of the wives, children, and property of the decapitated. As Zhao advanced upriver, his son Zhao Ang, the leader of the Gentleman of the Household, led a hastily assembled relief column consisting of two regiments of standing forces from Chang'an. Bogged down by Qiang forces at Lianju and cut off from its supply lines, it was eventually reinforced by a group of around 5,000 cavalry. The Grand Administrator of Jincheng, who governed the commandery's force of 10,000 cavalry, was also sent to reinforce Zhao Ang. (Note: A significant portion of this number had likely formed part of Zhao Chongguo's initial army.) Units of convicts from the capital were sent to assist the Han forces, resulting in a total force of around 60,000 men.

Xin Wuxian wrote to Zhao Chongguo and advocated a strike on the Han (Note: Chinese: 罕; pinyin: Hǎn, not to be confused with the similarly named dynasty or ethnic group) and Kai tribes near Qinghai Lake, suggesting that the enslavement of their families and the seizure of their livestock would greatly weaken the Qiang. This would allow for their destruction by the main army in the winter. Zhao stated that the plan would leave the northern frontier undefended against a potential Xiongnu attack, and that the amount of supplies needed for such an expedition would unhelpfully encumber the horses. Although the Han and Kai tribes were seen as most responsible for the rebellion, he believed that subduing and gaining the allegiance of the nearby Xianlian would secure the frontier against the other Qiang tribes.

After deliberations, the Three Dukes and the Nine Ministers advised the emperor against Zhao's proposal. Yiqu Anguo was dispatched to deliver the emperor's response to Zhao, reprimanding him for not seeking to prevent Han and Kai raids into Gansu. The emperor also gave Xin Wuxian the title of 'General Who Smashes the Qiang' (破羌將軍; pòqiāng jiāngjūn). Zhao rebuked this and responded with a further twelve-part outline of his plan in July or August of 61, stating that he still wished to attack the Xianlian, and only attack the Han and Kai if they continued their hostilities afterwards. He noted that a preemptive attack against the Han and Kai would guarantee their alliance with the Xianlian, while they could be otherwise convinced to turn against them. After a very brief period of deliberation, the emperor conceded and approved Zhao's plan.

Zhao advanced further into Qiang territory. The Xianlian troops scattered at their approach, leaving behind their livestock, carts, and wagons. The Chinese army proceeded into the territories of the Han sub-tribe, likely to the northeast of Qinghai Lake, but refrained from looting. This endeared the Han to the army. Around September, the Qiang chieftain Miwang sent an envoy to Zhao, asking for his people to be allowed to return to their original territory. (Note: The location of the Han tribe's territories is unknown, and they may have been to the north or south of the Huangshi.) Although most of his officers were opposed to pardoning Miwang for allying with the Xianlian, Zhao overruled them and granted clemency to him and the Han tribe.

=== Agricultural garrisons ===
Zhao fell ill around two months later, but was urged to stay on the offense by Emperor Xuan. The emperor ordered Xin Wuxian to transfer his garrison troops to Zhao's army and ordered Zhao to attack around the January 60 BC, citing auspicious astrological signs. If Zhao's illness worsened, he ordered Xin and the General of Strong Crossbows, Xu Yanshou, to launch the attack in his stead. This frustrated Zhao, who did not seek to launch offensive operations immediately, and so had no use for additional men under his command; by the end of the year, he commanded an army of around 60,000 troops, requiring large amounts of grain and salt for rations. Zhao Ang sent an aide to his father, begging him to follow the emperor's orders despite his illness. Zhao replied that he intended to continue his plans, stating that "our brilliant ruler may judge if my words are loyal".

Zhao outlined a strategy for a longer-term occupation of the Qiang territories using tuntian (lit. 'farming garrisons'). He sought permission to disband most of his forces, leaving only 10,281 troops (comprising the troops from the commanderies of Huaiyang and Runan as well as the former convicts from the capital region) behind. These would refrain from offensive operations to construct administrative outposts, irrigation ditches, and reservoirs to build up the agricultural capacity along the Huangshui. He predicted that this could extend administration as far as Qinghai Lake. A group of 1,000 cavalrymen would be reserved to live off the land during the spring and summer to protect the army's farms.

Emperor Xuan was befuddled by Zhao's proposal, asking in reply: "What sort of general would plan this? When will the enemy be exterminated? When will our troops gain a decision? If you can figure out why this plan is to our advantage, memorialize again!" Zhao responded with another memorial, listing twelve advantages of his plan. He described the plan as denying the Qiang their most fertile territories and instead relegating them to the arid highlands, causing infighting and starvation among the Qiang armies. The plan would also allow for the construction of infrastructure to keep troops constantly supplied, as opposed to carrying their own supplies through the mountains, where they may be ambushed or cut off from resupply.

Zhao dismissed imperial concerns that the reduction in numbers would put the troops at risk of a large-scale Qiang assault by emphasizing that waiting out the enemy would further reduce their combat capacity due to their lack of supplies. The emperor submitted Zhao's proposal to several high officials for review, including the Three Dukes and the Nine Ministers. (Note: Only two officials held the ducal positions at the time. Beyond these two dukes and the nine ministers, it is unknown which other officials supported or potentially opposed Zhao's plan.) Eighteen out of an unknown number of high officials supported Zhao's third memorial. When the emperor ordered them to look over the memorials again, Chancellor Wei Xiang urged him to defer to Zhao's expertise; the emperor sent Zhao affirmation for his plan, but simultaneously approved plans for an offensive with troops led by Xin Wuxian, Xu Yanshou, and Zhao Ang. Their three armies returned later with around 5,000 captives and 3,000 severed heads total; during this same period, 5,000 Qiang had surrendered to Zhao Chongguo's forces. Due to the heavy cost of the offensive operations in return for limited benefit, the emperor demobilized the other armies while maintaining Zhao's garrison. The Han established the dependent state of Jincheng in 60 BC, settling it with the surrendered Qiang tribes.

The Qiang continued to surrender to Zhao's forces. Many of the Qiang troops who had not starved or died in battle had fled elsewhere. Around July 60 BC, Zhao was granted approval to disband his garrison. He returned to the capital, and Xin Wuxian was demoted from generalship and sent back to govern Jiuquan. The soldiers of the garrison returned to their homes, ending the Han colonial presence in the region. A second attempt at establishing agricultural colonies was made a few years after Zhao's withdrawal. Such attempts would not be made again until the 2nd century CE, during a series of rebellions and uprisings among the Qiang.

== Later life ==
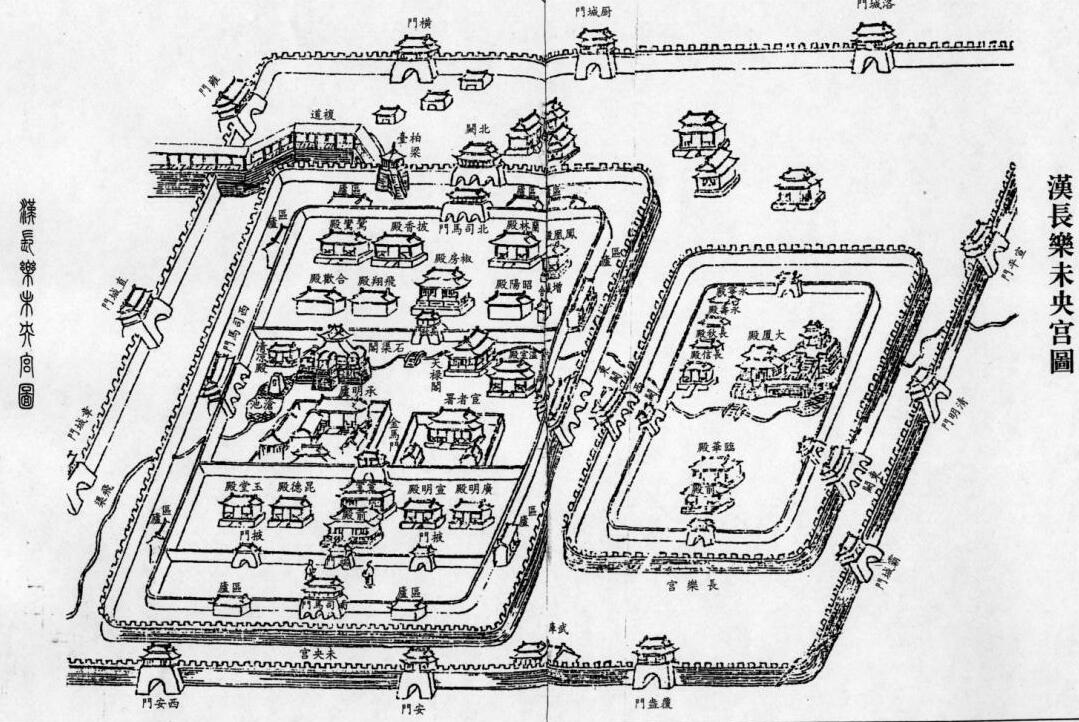
18th century depiction of Weiyang Palace of Chang'an, the imperial palace of the Han dynasty

After returning to Chang'an, Zhao became the Commandant of the Guards, one of the Nine Ministers. In this post, he managed the conscript troops which guarded the gates of the imperial palace of Weiyang in Chang'an. That year, Emperor Xuan recreated the post of Colonel Protector of the Qiang, which had become vacant at some point following its creation by Emperor Wu. Xin Tang, the younger brother of Xin Wuxian was appointed to the post; Zhao, although ill and unable to attend the previous meetings on the position, penned a memorial stating that Xin Tang was unsuitable for the position due to his alcoholism. Following Zhao's recommendation, the emperor revoked Xin Tang's appointment in lieu of his elder brother Xin Linzhong.

During a dinner party, Zhao Ang described a private meeting he had once had with Emperor Wu to Xin Wuxian. Xin, seeking vengeance for his demotion back to Grand Administrator of Jiuquan, reported this breach of imperial confidence, and had Zhao Ang placed under probationary measures. Later in 60 BC, Zhao Ang violated these measures by arriving at his father's headquarters and creating a great deal of disorder among his troops; Zhao Ang was demoted to petty officialdom and later committed suicide. Zhao Chongguo held a funeral for his son, for which he was granted a four-horse coach and 13.32 kilograms (29.4 lb) of gold—sixty catties.

== Death and legacy ==
In 60, Zhao retired to his home in the northwestern commanderies, and was rewarded with great wealth. He continued to participate in state discussions on foreign policy until he died in 52. Following renewed hostilities with the Qiang, Emperor Cheng (r. 33 – 7 BCE) had Zhao Chongguo's remains reinterred at the Duling Mausoleum (the tomb of Emperor Xuan) in Chang'an. Emperor Cheng honored Zhao with a portrait at the imperial palace accompanied by a eulogy hymn commissioned from the poet Yang Xiong.

Zhao's marquisate of Yingping passed to Zhao Ang's son Qin. After Zhao Qin's death, it passed to his wife Princess Jingwu's adopted son, Zhao Cen; this was later removed in 10 BC after a dispute between Jingwu and Cen's biological father. Under the reign of Emperor Ping (r. 1–6 CE), the marquisate was recreated and granted to Zhao Chongguo's great-grandson, Zhao Ji. The title was abolished at some point before the fall of the usurper emperor Wang Mang's regime in 23 CE.

Although tuntian had been coined before Zhao's campaign, his outline of the strategy to Emperor Xuan became a foundational strategic text for its implementation. The strategy would be implemented by the Northern Wei, Sui, and Tang as the fubing system, and by the Ming dynasty through the weisuo system. In 1700, during the Dzungar–Qing Wars, the Kangxi Emperor of the Qing dynasty told his generals to study Zhao Chongguo's campaigns while attempting to create military settlements in Xinjiang.

The Book of Han (a 2nd century history of the Western Han dynasty) features a biography of Zhao Chongguo, which remains the only primary source on his life and career beyond a brief mention in a family genealogical stele which was erected dated to 180 CE and rediscovered in 1942.
