= Tornada (Occitan literary term) =

Type of stanza in lyric poetry

A page from the 14th-century Cançoner Gil. The last line, beginning with a red paragraph marker, is the tornada: “Per Deu, fila, no•us sera malestan / si retenetz vostr'amic en baysan”.

In Old Occitan literature, a tornada (Occitan: [tuɾˈnaðɔ, tuʀˈnadɔ], Catalan: [tuɾˈnaðə, toɾˈnaða]; "turned, twisted") refers to a final, shorter stanza (or cobla) that appears in lyric poetry and serves a variety of purposes within several poetic forms. The word tornada derives from the Old Occitan in which it is the feminine form of tornat, a past participle of the verb tornar ("to turn, return"). It is derived from the Latin verb tornare ("to turn in a lathe, round off").

Originating in the Provence region of present-day France, Occitan literature spread through the tradition of the troubadours in the High Middle Ages. The tornada became a hallmark of the language's lyric poetry tradition which emerged c. 1000 in a region called Occitania that now comprises parts of modern-day France, Italy and Catalonia (northeastern Spain). Under the influence of the troubadours, related movements sprang up throughout medieval Europe: the Minnesang in Germany, trovadorismo in Galicia (northeastern Spain) and Portugal, and that of the trouvères in northern France. Because of this, the concept embodied in the tornada has been found in other Romance language literatures that can directly trace several of their techniques from the Occitan lyric tradition. The tornada appears in Old French literature as the envoi, in Galician-Portuguese literature as the finda, and in Italian literature as the congedo and commiato. The tornada has been used and developed by poets in the Renaissance such as Petrarch (1304–1374) and Dante Alighieri (c.1265–1321), and it continues to be invoked in the poetic forms that originated with the Occitan lyrical tradition that have survived into modernity.

By c. 1170 the Occitan lyric tradition had become a set of generic concepts developed by troubadours, poets who composed and performed their poetry; the majority of their poems can be categorised as cansos (love songs), sirventes (satires), and the cobla (individual stanzas). Since they are composed of a variable number of lines, an individual tornada can also be known as by more general poetic labels that apply to stanza length, according to where it is used; the tornada of a sestina, comprising three lines, is also known as a tercet. The tornada can also be modified by the poetic form it is found in; in the sestina (a poetic form that is derived from the troubadour tradition), the tornada should contain all of the six so-called "rhyme-words" that are repeated throughout the form (usually taking the pattern 2–5, 4–3, 6–1; the first rhyme-word of each pair can occur anywhere in the line, while the second iteration must end the line). However, as the form developed, the end-word order of the tornada ceased to be strictly enforced.

"Tant ai mo cor ple de joya"
(trans. "My heart is now so full of joy")

Messatgers, vai e cor
e di•m a la gensor
la pena e la dolor
que•n trac, e•l martire

(Go, messengers, and run,
and tell the people of
the pain and sorrow that it brings
and final martyrdom)

— The tornada from "Tant ai mo cor ple de joya" by Bernart de Ventadorn (fl. 1130–1200), an early example of the form.

Tornadas can serve a number of purposes within poems; they often contain useful information about the poem's composition—often able to identify the location and date of the poem's composition, and the identity of members of the troubadour's circle—and several tornadas serve as dedications to a friend or patron of the poet. An additional purpose of the tornada is to focus and reflect on the theme of the poem, commenting on the surrounding material within the poem, and to act as a concluding stanza for the poem. However, the device can sometimes be used to create new narrative material. For instance, in Marcabru's pastorela “L’autrier jost’una sebissa” (trans. "The other day along a hedgerow"), the narrator is attracted to a shepherdess for her feisty wit and professes that "country-men want country-women / in places where all wisdom's lacking." The shepherdess' reply in the tornada—"and some will gawk before a painting / while others wait to see real manna"—serves to "[create] some tension with the enigma she seems to introduce suddenly at the end."

In the original Occitan model, the tornada was a stanza that metrically replicated the second half (sirima) of the preceding strophe (a structural division of a poem containing stanzas of varying length). Since the poems of the troubadours were very often accompanied by music, the music of the tornada would have indicated the end of the poem to an audience. Comparatively, the Sicilian tornada was larger, forming the entire last strophe of the song or ballad being performed (canzone), and varied little in terms of its theme—typically a personification of the poem, with a request for it to deliver instructions from the poet. The Dolce Stil Novo, a thirteenth-century literary movement in Italian Renaissance poetry, deployed the stanza form in their ballata and sonnets. The movement's principal figures—Dante and Cavalcanti—extended the use of the tornada throughout an entire poem, as opposed to being used as a concluding stanza. In his poem "Sonetto, se Meuccio t’è mostrato", Dante personifies the poem as a "little messenger boy":

Sonetto, se Meuccio t’è mostrato,
così tosto ‘l saluta come ‘l vedi,
e ‘ va’ correndo e gittaliti a’ piedi,
sì che tu paie bene accostumato.

Translation:

As soon as he is introduced to you,
you must, O sonnet, dear Meuccio greet:
run toward him, throw yourself quick at his feet,
and your good manners show to those in view.

As the form developed, the purpose of the tornada evolved from a purely stylistic device to include emotional aspects; Levin summarises that "[the tornada] developed in the Italian lyric from a simple concluding formula to a sophisticated projection of the poet's message through the medium of a human character." Whereas tornadas had primarily been an extension of the poet's voice, the innovation of the Dolce Stil Novo movement was to provide them with an autonomous human voice, often in the form of a unique character.
