= Sestina =

Fixed verse form of poetry

"Sestina"

In fair Provence, the land of lute and rose,
Arnaut, great master of the lore of love,
First wrought sestines to win his lady's heart,
For she was deaf when simpler staves he sang,
And for her sake he broke the bonds of rhyme,
And in this subtler measure hid his woe.

'Harsh be my lines,' cried Arnaut, 'harsh the woe
My lady, that enthorn'd and cruel rose,
Inflicts on him that made her live in rhyme!'
But through the metre spake the voice of Love,
And like a wild-wood nightingale he sang
Who thought in crabbed lays to ease his heart.

— First two stanzas of the sestina "Sestina"
Edmund Gosse (1879)

A sestina (Italian: sestina, from sesto, sixth; Old Occitan: cledisat [klediˈzat]; also known as sestine, sextine, sextain) is a fixed verse form consisting of six stanzas of six lines each, normally followed by a three-line envoi. The words that end each line of the first stanza are used as line endings in each of the following stanzas, rotated in a set pattern.

The invention of the form is usually attributed to Arnaut Daniel, a troubadour of 12th-century Provence, and the first sestinas were written in the Occitan language of that region. The form was cultivated by his fellow troubadours, then by other poets across Continental Europe in the subsequent centuries; they contributed to what would become the "standard form" of the sestina. The earliest example of the form in English appeared in 1579, though they were rarely written in Britain until the end of the 19th century. The sestina remains a popular poetic form, and many sestinas continue to be written by contemporary poets.

== History ==
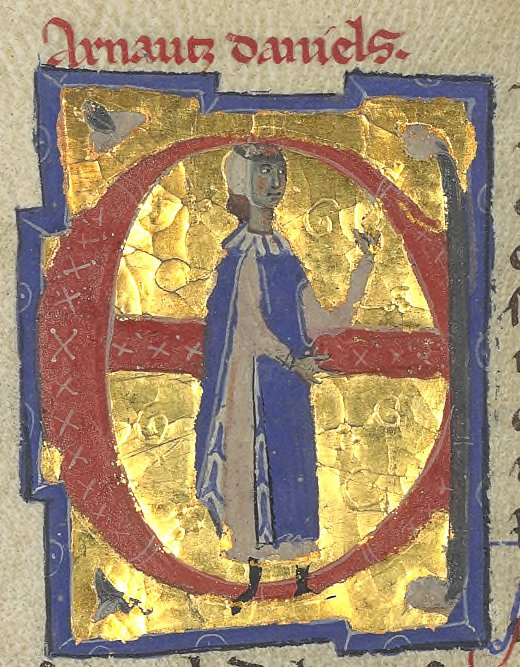
The Occitan troubadour Arnaut Daniel, considered the originator of the sestina

The oldest-known sestina is "Lo ferm voler qu'el cor m'intra", written around 1200 by Arnaut Daniel, a troubadour of Aquitanian origin; he refers to it as "cledisat", meaning, more or less, "interlock". Hence, Daniel is generally considered the form's inventor, though it has been suggested that he may only have innovated an already existing form. Nevertheless, two other original troubadouric sestinas are recognised, the best known being "Eras, pus vey mon benastruc" by Guilhem Peire Cazals de Caortz; there are also two contrafacta built on the same end-words, the best known being Ben gran avoleza intra by Bertran de Born. These early sestinas were written in Old Occitan; the form started spilling into Italian with Dante in the 13th century; by the 16th century, it was used in Portuguese by Luís de Camões.

The involvement of Dante and Petrarch in establishing the sestina form, together with the contributions of others in the country, account for its classification as an Italian verse form—despite not originating there. The result was that the sestina was re-imported into France from Italy in the 16th century. Pontus de Tyard was the first poet to attempt the form in French, and the only one to do so prior to the 19th century; he introduced a partial rhyme scheme into his sestina.

=== English ===
An early version of the sestina in Middle English is the "Hymn to Venus" by Elizabeth Woodville (1437–1492); it is an "elaboration" on the form, found in one single manuscript. It is a six-stanza poem that praises Venus, the goddess of love, and consists of six seven-line stanzas in which the first line of each stanza is also its last line, and the lines of the first stanza provide the first lines for each subsequent stanza.

The first appearance of the sestina in English print is "Ye wastefull woodes", comprising lines 151–89 of the August Æglogue in Edmund Spenser's Shepherd's Calendar, published in 1579. It is in unrhymed iambic pentameter, but the order of end-words in each stanza is non-standard – ending 123456, 612345, etc. – each stanza promoting the previous final end-word to the first line, but otherwise leaving the order intact; the envoi order is (1) 2 / (3) 4 / (5) 6. This scheme was set by the Spaniard Gutierre de Cetina.

Although they appeared in print later, Philip Sidney's three sestinas may have been written earlier, and are often credited as the first in English. The first published (toward the end of Book I of The Countess of Pembroke's Arcadia, 1590) is the double sestina "Ye Goatherd Gods". In this variant the standard end-word pattern is repeated for twelve stanzas, ending with a three-line envoi, resulting in a poem of 75 lines. Two others were published in subsequent editions of the Arcadia. The second, "Since wailing is a bud of causeful sorrow", is in the "standard" form. Like "Ye Goatherd Gods" it is written in unrhymed iambic pentameter and uses exclusively feminine endings, reflecting the Italian endecasillabo. The third, "Farewell, O sun, Arcadia's clearest light", is the first rhyming sestina in English: it is in iambic pentameters and follows the standard end-word scheme, but rhymes $\mathrm{ABABCC}$ in the first stanza (the rhyme scheme necessarily changes in each subsequent stanza, a consequence of which is that the 6th stanza is in rhyming couplets). Sidney uses the same envoi structure as Spenser. William Drummond of Hawthornden published two sestinas (which he called "sextains") in 1616, which copy the form of Sidney's rhyming sestina. After this, there is an absence of notable sestinas for over 250 years, with John Frederick Nims noting that, "... there is not a single sestina in the three volumes of the Oxford anthologies that cover the seventeenth, eighteenth and nineteenth centuries."

In the 1870s, there was a revival of interest in French forms, led by Andrew Lang, Austin Dobson, Edmund Gosse, W. E. Henley, John Payne, and others. The earliest sestina of this period is Algernon Charles Swinburne's "Sestina". It is in iambic pentameter rhyming $\mathrm{ABABAB}$ in the first stanza; each stanza begins by repeating the previous end-words 6 then 1, but the following 4 lines repeat the remaining end-words ad lib; the envoi is (1) 4 / (2) 3 / (5) 6. In the same volume (Poems and Ballads, Second Series, 1878) Swinburne introduces a "double sestina" ("The Complaint of Lisa") that is unlike Sidney's: it comprises 12 stanzas of 12 iambic pentameter lines each, the first stanza rhyming $\mathrm{ABCABDCEFEDF}$. Similar to his "Sestina", each stanza first repeats end-words 12 then 1 of the previous stanza; the rest are ad lib. The envoi is (12) 10 / (8) 9 / (7) 4 / (3) 6 / (2) 1 / (11) 5.

From the 1930s, a revival of the form took place across the English-speaking world, led by poets such as W. H. Auden, and the 1950s were described as the "age of the sestina" by James E. B. Breslin. "Sestina: Altaforte" by Ezra Pound, "Paysage moralisé" by W. H. Auden, and "Sestina" by Elizabeth Bishop are distinguished modern examples of the sestina. "Histoire" by Harry Mathews adds an additional Oulipian constraint: the end words wildly misusing ideological or prejudicial terms. The sestina remains a popular closed verse form, and many sestinas continue to be written by contemporary poets; notable examples include "Six Bad Poets" by Christopher Reid, "The Guest Ellen at the Supper for Street People" by David Ferry and "IVF" by Kona Macphee.

== Form ==
Graphical representation of the algorithm for ordering the end-words in a sestina

Although the sestina form has been revised throughout its development, several features define it. A sestina comprises six stanzas of six lines (sixains), followed by a stanza of three lines (a tercet). There is no rhyme within the stanzas; instead the sestina is structured by a recurrent pattern of the words that end each line, a technique called "lexical repetition".

In the original form composed by Daniel, each line has ten syllables, except the first of each stanza, which has seven. The established form, as developed by Petrarch and Dante, was in hendecasyllables. Since then, changes to line lengths have been relatively common, such that Stephanie Burt has written: "sestinas, as the form exists today, [do not] require expertise with inherited meter".

Each stanza takes its pattern from a bottom-up pairing of the lines of the preceding stanza (i.e., last and first, then fifth and second, then fourth and third). With the numbers 1 through 6 representing the end-words of the first stanza, this produces 615243 in the second stanza, a numerical series that corresponds, as Paolo Canettieri has shown, to the way in which the pips on dice are arranged. Arnaut Daniel was a strong dice player and various images related to dice appear in his work.

Retrogradatio cruciata: The pattern of end-words in one stanza of a sestina, relative to the previous stanza

Another way of visualising the pattern of line-ending words for each stanza is by the procedure known as retrogradatio cruciata, which may be rendered as "backward crossing". The second stanza can be seen to have been formed from three sets of pairs (6–1, 5–2, 4–3), or two triads (1–2–3, 4–5–6). The 1–2–3 triad appears in its original order, but the 4–5–6 triad is reversed and superimposed upon it.

The pattern of the line-ending words in a sestina is represented both numerically and alphabetically in the following table:

Table of sestina end-words
Stanza 1	Stanza 2	Stanza 3	Stanza 4	Stanza 5	Stanza 6
1 A	6 F	3 C	5 E	4 D	2 B
2 B	1 A	6 F	3 C	5 E	4 D
3 C	5 E	4 D	2 B	1 A	6 F
4 D	2 B	1 A	6 F	3 C	5 E
5 E	4 D	2 B	1 A	6 F	3 C
6 F	3 C	5 E	4 D	2 B	1 A

The sixth stanza is followed by a tercet that is known variably by the French term envoi, the Occitan term tornada, or, with reference to its size in relation to the preceding stanzas, a "half-stanza". It consists of three lines that include all six of the line-ending words of the preceding stanzas. This should take the pattern of 2–5, 4–3, 6–1 (numbers relative to the first stanza); the first end-word of each pair can occur anywhere in the line, while the second must end the line. However, the end-word order of the envoi is no longer strictly enforced.

"Sestina"

Time to plant tears (6), says the almanac (5).
The grandmother (2) sings to the marvelous stove (4)
and the child (3) draws another inscrutable house (1).

— The envoi to "Sestina"; the repeated words are emboldened and labelled.
Elizabeth Bishop (1965)

The sestina has been subject to some variations, with changes being made to both the size and number of stanzas, and also to individual line length. A "double sestina" is the name given to either: two sets of six six-line stanzas, with a three-line envoy (for a total of 75 lines), or twelve twelve-line stanzas, with a six-line envoy (for a total of 150 lines). Examples of either variation are rare; "Ye Goatherd Gods" by Philip Sidney is a notable example of the former variation, while "The Complaint of Lisa" by Algernon Charles Swinburne is a notable example of the latter variation. In the former variation, the original pattern of line-ending words, i.e. that of the first stanza, recurs in the seventh stanza, and thus the entire change of pattern occurs twice throughout. In the second variation, the pattern of line-ending words returns to the starting sequence in the eleventh stanza; thus it does not, unlike the "single" sestina, allow for every end-word to occupy each of the stanza ends; end-words 5 and 10 fail to couple between stanzas.

== Effect ==
The structure of the sestina, which demands adherence to a strict and arbitrary order, produces several effects within a poem. Stephanie Burt notes that, "The sestina has served, historically, as a complaint", its harsh demands acting as "signs for deprivation or duress". The structure can enhance the subject matter that it orders; in reference to Elizabeth Bishop's A Miracle for Breakfast, David Caplan suggests that the form's "harshly arbitrary demands echo its subject's". Nevertheless, the form's structure has been criticised; Paul Fussell considers the sestina to be of "dubious structural expressiveness" when composed in English and, irrespective of how it is used, "would seem to be [a form] that gives more structural pleasure to the contriver than to the apprehender".

Margaret Spanos highlights "a number of corresponding levels of tension and resolution" resulting from the structural form, including: structural, semantic and aesthetic tensions. She believes that the aesthetic tension, which results from the "conception of its mathematical completeness and perfection", set against the "experiences of its labyrinthine complexities" can be resolved in the apprehension of the "harmony of the whole".

The strength of the sestina, according to Stephen Fry, is the "repetition and recycling of elusive patterns that cannot be quite held in the mind all at once". For Shanna Compton, these patterns are easily discernible by newcomers to the form; she says that: "Even someone unfamiliar with the form's rules can tell by the end of the second stanza ... what's going on ...".

== Examples ==
- The 1972 television play Between Time and Timbuktu, based on the writings of Kurt Vonnegut, is about a poet-astronaut who wanted to compose a sestina in outer space. Vonnegut wrote a sestina for the production.

== See also ==
- Canzone, an Italian or Provençal song or ballad, in which the sestina is sometimes included.
- Pentina, a variation of the sestina based on five endwords.
- Villanelle, another type of fixed verse form.
