= Emperor Xuan of Han =

Emperor of the Han dynasty from 74 to 48 BC

Emperor Xuan of Han 漢宣帝
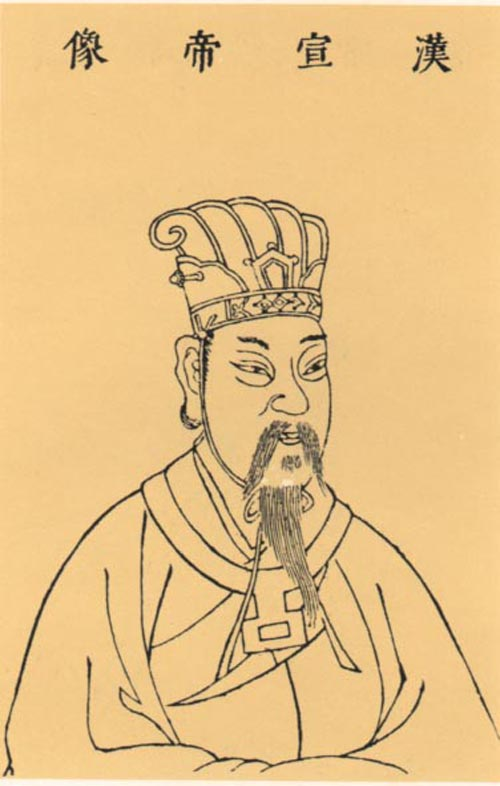
- Depiction of Emperor Xuan from Sancai Tuhui

Emperor of the Han dynasty
- Reign: 10 September 74 BC – 10 January 48 BC
- Predecessor: Liu He
- Successor: Emperor Yuan
- Born: 91 BC; Chang'an, Han dynasty
- Died: 10 January 48 BC (aged 43); Chang'an, Han dynasty
- Burial: Du Mausoleum (杜陵), Xi'an
- Consorts: Empress Gong'ai; Empress Huo; Empress Xiaoxuan
- Issue: Emperor Yuan; Liu Qin; Liu Xiao; Liu Yu; Liu Jing; Princess Guantao; Princess Jingwu
Names
- Liú Bìngyǐ (劉病已), later Liú Xún (劉詢)
Era dates
- Běnshǐ 本始 (73–70 BC); Dìjié 地節 (69–66 BC); Yúankāng 元康 (65–61 BC); Shénjué 神爵 (61–58 BC); Wŭfèng 五鳳 (57–54 BC); Gānlù 甘露 (53–50 BC); Huánglóng 黃龍 (49 BC)
Posthumous name
- Short: Emperor Xuan (宣帝) "responsible" Full: Emperor Xiaoxuan (孝宣皇帝) "filial and know by many"
Temple name
- Zhōngzōng (中宗)
- House: Liu
- Dynasty: Han (Western Han)
- Father: Liu Jin
- Mother: Wang Wengxu

Emperor Xuan of Han (Chinese: 漢宣帝; 91 BC – 10 January 48 BC), born Liu Bingyi (劉病已) and later renamed Liu Xun (劉詢), was the tenth emperor of the Han dynasty, reigning from 74 to 48 BC. During his reign, the Han dynasty recovered economically from the prior attritions of the costly Han–Xiongnu War and militarily dominated the Far East and Central Asia to become the regional superpower, thus establishing the first period of Pax Sinica. As a result, Emperor Xuan was one of the only four Western Han emperors to be posthumously honored with a temple name, along with Emperor Gaozu (who founded the Han dynasty), Emperor Wen (who ended the Lü Clan disturbance and started the prosperous Rule of Wen and Jing) and Emperor Wu (who greatly expanded the Han Empire's territory and sphere of influence).

Emperor Xuan's life was a "riches-to-rags-to-riches" story. He was born a prince as the eldest great-grandson of Emperor Wu and the only grandchild of crown prince Liu Ju, making him then the third heir to the Han throne in the primogenital line of succession. His grandfather was the firstborn son of Emperor Wu with Empress Wei Zifu and the heir apparent of the Han Empire, who also had served as the prince regent for near two decades, but was framed for witchcraft practice against Emperor Wu and committed suicide after being forced into a failed uprising to purge the conspirators in 91 BC. His father Liu Jin (劉進) was also killed in that political turmoil, along with the rest of his family. The orphaned Liu Bingyi was then only a month-old infant who was thrown into prison as kin punishment and only survived due to the protective custody of a sympathetic prison warden named Bing Ji, and he lived his youth away from the palaces like a commoner after being pardoned by a nationwide amnesty from Emperor Wu in 87 BC. After the death of the childless Emperor Zhao and subsequently Liu He's short 27-day reign in 74 BC, the 17-year-old Liu Bingyi was selected by the statesman Huo Guang (the half-brother of Liu Bingyi's great-cousin Huo Qubing) for the throne, inheriting the crown that ironically would have been his anyway if his grandfather's rebellion in 91 BC hadn't happened or had succeeded.

The early years of Emperor Xuan's reign was a continuation of that of his predecessor Emperor Zhao, where imperial politics was dominated by Huo Guang as the administrative oligarch, and Emperor Xuan was described as being constantly cautious of Huo's political authority "like sitting on a pin cushion". After Huo Guang's death in 68 BC, Emperor Xuan consolidated political power by eliminating corrupt officials, particularly the purging of the Huo family, who had exerted considerable political influence since the death of Emperor Wu. However, the familial extermination of the entire Huo clan later drew heavy criticism from historians (such as Sima Guang in his Zizhi Tongjian) for being "ungrateful" to the late Huo Guang, despite the fact that the purge was the result of a series of treasons that had been committed for years by members of the Huo family behind Huo Guang's back.

Emperor Xuan has been considered a wise, hardworking and brilliantly effective ruler by historians. Because he grew up among commoners, he thoroughly understood the struggles of the grassroot population, and lowered taxes, liberalized the government and employed capable bureaucrats into the civil services. He was open to advices and criticisms, and was a good judge of characters. He was said by Liu Xiang to have been fond of reading the works of Shen Buhai. Using Xing-Ming to control his subordinates, and devoting much time to legal cases, he was known for justice and clemency according to the Hanshu. His reign, along with that of his great-uncle and predecessor Emperor Zhao, are known by historians as the Zhao–Xuan Resurgence (昭宣中興) for the significant economic recovery and geopolitical prominence, which was considered by many to be the peak period of the entire Han dynasty. Emperor Xuan was succeeded by his son Emperor Yuan after his death in 48 BC.

== Family background and early life ==
=== Parentage, disaster, and a barely spared young life ===
Liu Bingyi was born in 91 BC to Liu Jin, the son of then-Crown Prince Liu Ju, and his wife Consort Wang. As the grandson of the Crown Prince, Bingyi likely was born in Prince Ju's palace.

That same year, however, disaster would strike. With conspirators accusing him of using witchcraft against his father Emperor Wu, Prince Ju was forced into a rebellion, which Prince Ju was defeated. Prince Ju committed suicide, and Bingyi's two uncles died with him, although it was not clear whether they also committed suicide or were killed by soldiers. Bingyi's great-grandmother Empress Wei also committed suicide, and his grandmother (Prince Ju's concubine) Consort Shi and his parents died in the incident as well in the capital Chang'an. It is not completely clear whether they took their own lives or were executed, but the latter seems likely.

For reasons not completely clear, baby Bingyi was spared, but was imprisoned in a prison overseen by the Ministry of Vassal Affairs. He was put into the custody of the warden Bing Ji (丙吉). Bing knew that Prince Ju was actually innocent of witchcraft and took pity on the child, and selected two kind female prisoners, Hu Zu (胡組) and Guo Zhengqing (郭徵卿) to serve as his wet nurses and caretakers. Bing Ji visited them each day to see how the child was doing.

=== Childhood ===
Near the end of Emperor Wu's reign, there was an incident whereby magicians claimed that an aura of an emperor was appearing from Chang'an's prisons. Emperor Wu fearing that whoever the aura came from would later steal the throne from the imperial clan ordered that all prisoners, regardless of whether they had been convicted or not and regardless of the severity of the charges, were to be executed. When the eunuch delivering the edict arrived at the Vassal Affairs prison that Bing oversaw, Bing refused to accept the edict, stating that no one who had not been convicted of a capital crime should be executed, and particularly not the emperor's own great-grandson. The eunuch filed charges against Bing for refusing to abide by the edict—a capital offense—but by that time Emperor Wu had realized his error, and declared a general pardon. The prisoners in all other prisons were dead, but the prisoners at Bing's prison survived.

However, this incident made Bing feel that it was inappropriate for the young Bingyi to remain at the prison, and so he ordered one of his lieutenants to transfer Bingyi and Hu (Guo might have died by this point) to the city government of Chang'an. The city government refused to accept responsibility, and so Bing had to let them remain in prison. After Hu's sentence was over, Bing hired her out of his own pocket to continue to serve as a wet nurse for several months, before letting her leave. Later, the budget for taking care of Bingyi was cut off from the imperial clan affairs budget, and Bing took money out of his own salary to care for Bingyi. When he grew somewhat older, Bing heard that Consort Shi's mother Zhenjun (貞君) and brother Shi Gong (史恭) survived the witchcraft incident, and so sought them out and had Bingyi delivered to the Shi residence. Lady Zhenjun then raised him herself.

Several years later, Bingyi's granduncle Emperor Zhao found out that Bingyi was alive, and ordered that the Ministry of Imperial Clan Affairs take over the duty for caring for Bingyi. The chief eunuch at the palace Zhang He (張賀), who had previously been an advisor to Prince Ju before he was castrated by Emperor Wu in the aftermath of Prince Ju's death, cared well for young Bingyi, and paid for his expenses and studies out of his own pocket.

=== Young adulthood and marriage ===
Circa 76 BC, Zhang wanted to marry his granddaughter to Bingyi, but his brother Zhang Anshi (張安世), then an important official, opposed, fearing that it would bring trouble. Zhang, instead, invited one of his subordinate eunuchs (who had also been castrated by Emperor Wu), Xu Guanghan (許廣漢), to dine, and persuaded him to marry his daughter Xu Pingjun to him. When Xu's wife heard this, she became extremely angry and refused, but because Zhang was Xu's superior, Xu did not dare to renege on the promise, and Bingyi and Pingjun were married, in a ceremony entirely paid by Zhang (because Bingyi could not afford it). Zhang also paid the bride price.

After marriage, Bingyi depended on his wife's family and his grandmother's family for support, and he hired a teacher to teach him the Confucian classics. He was a diligent learner, and he also had a strong sense of social justice. As a teenager, he had many friends from all walks of life and was able to see the dark sides of society and the suffering of the people at the hands of corrupt officials. He had a strong interest in hiking. Occasionally he was summoned to see Emperor Zhao. Pingjun gave birth to a son, Liu Shi.

== Succession to the throne ==
After Emperor Zhao died in 74 BC at the age of 20, the regent Huo Guang initially offered the throne to Prince He of Changyi. However, after Prince He quickly showed his unsuitability to be an emperor, Huo removed him from the throne. Huo, however, could not find a suitable successor among the princes. At Bing's recommendation (although the exact process behind the scenes was not completely clear), Huo, with Zhang Anshi's concurrence, decided to offer the throne to Bingyi, then 17, an offer ratified by Huo's granddaughter Empress Dowager Shangguan. To avoid having a commoner take the throne, 27 days after Prince He was removed from the throne, Empress Dowager Shangguan first created him the Marquess of Yangwu. On the same day, he was offered the imperial seal and ribbon and the throne, and he accepted.

== Early reign ==
When Emperor Xuan accepted the throne, his son Prince Shi was barely a few months old. Prince Shi's mother Xu Pingjun was initially created a consort. When it came time to create an empress, the officials largely wanted Emperor Xuan to marry Huo Guang's daughter Huo Chengjun (霍成君) and make her empress. Emperor Xuan did not explicitly reject this proposal but issued an order to seek out the sword that he owned as a commoner. Getting the hint, the officials recommended Consort Xu as empress, and she was created as such late in 74 BC. He initially wanted to make his father-in-law Xu Guanghan a marquess, but Huo opposed, reasoning a eunuch who had suffered castration as a punishment should not be made a marquess. Instead, Xu was given the title of Lord of Changcheng (昌成君).

In 73 BC, Huo offered to be relieved of his responsibilities as a regent. Emperor Xuan declined and ordered that all important matters of the state and the army would still be submitted to Huo first, and by doing this, the Emperor's affairs will be done, so Huo continued to "talking for the Emperor". He also gave high positions to Huo's son Huo Yu (霍禹) and grandnephews Huo Yun (霍雲) and Huo Shan (霍山), as well as Huo's sons-in-law Fan Mingyou (范明友) and Deng Guanghan (鄧廣漢). In many ways, Emperor Xuan, although now emperor, remained intimidated by the powers of Huo and was always humble in front of him. In that same year, Emperor Xuan restored posthumous titles to his grandparents and parents (although, perhaps out of the respect to Emperor Zhao's memory, Crown Prince Ju received the rather unflattering posthumous name "Li" (戾, unrepenting)) and reburied them with honor. In 67 BC, he also finally found his maternal grandmother and her family, and he rewarded his grandmother and uncles with riches, and made his uncles marquesses.

Huo Guang's wife Xian (顯) was granted her wish of wanting her daughter become an empress. In 71 BC, Empress Xu was pregnant when Lady Xian came up with a plot. She bribed Empress Xu's female physician Chunyu Yan (淳于衍), under the guise of giving Empress Xu medicine after birth, to poison her. Chunyu did so, and Empress Xu died shortly after she gave birth. Her doctors were initially arrested to investigate whether they cared for the empress properly. Lady Xian, alarmed, informed Huo Guang what had happened, and Huo, not wanting to turn in his wife, instead signed Chunyu's release.

In that same year, a major battle with Xiongnu occurred. Xiongnu had been incessantly attacking the Xiyu (central Asia) kingdom of Wusun, whose queen was the Han princess Liu Jieyou (劉解憂). Emperor Xuan commissioned five generals and coordinated a plan with Wusun to attack Xiongnu at the same time. Xiongnu put the strongest defenses against the Han generals, the battle were largely inconclusively, but with the western frontier now weakened, Wusun forces won a major victory over Xiongnu, severely crippling Xiongnu's western region. For years after, without Han engaging major forces, Xiongnu was constantly under attack by Dingling from the north, Wuhuan from the east, and Wusun from the west, and became unable to harass Han borders.

In 70 BC, Emperor Xuan made Huo Chengjun empress. Accustomed to luxury living, her palace expenses far exceeding the late Empress Xu.

Emperor Xuan's early reign was generally known for his willingness to innovate, to commission officials who were lenient on the people, and to listen to advice. For example, in 67 BC, based on a submission from a Justice Ministry official Lu Wenshu (路溫舒), who was concerned about the harshness of the criminal justice system, Emperor Xuan added four appellate judges who were in charge of hearing final appeals. While this fell well short of what Lu suggested, it did help to somewhat reform the justice system.

== Purge of the Huo clan ==
In 68 BC, Huo Guang died. Emperor Xuan and Grand Empress Dowager Shangguan made the nearly-unprecedented act of personally attending Huo's wake and built an impressive mausoleum for Huo. After Huo's death, Zhang Anshi and Wei Xiang (魏相) became Emperor Xuan's most powerful advisors, but Emperor Xuan assumed far more personal powers than he had during Huo's lifetime. Later, Bing Ji (who had not yet revealed by this point the extent of his contribution to the emperor's survival in his young age) also became a key official. Huo's son, grandnephews, and sons-in-law remained in key posts, however.

In 67 BC, Emperor Xuan made Prince Shi—the late Empress Xu's son—crown prince and made Empress Xu's father Xu Guanghan the Marquess of Ping'en—an action that Huo Guang had opposed. Huo's wife Lady Xian was shocked and displeased because if her daughter were to have a son later, that son could only be a prince and not the future emperor. She instructed her daughter to murder the crown prince. Allegedly, Empress Huo did make multiple attempts to do so but failed each time. Around this time, the emperor also heard rumors that the Huo clan had murdered Empress Xu, which led him to begin stripping the Huos of actual power while giving them impressive titles.

In 66 BC, after there had been increasing public rumors that the Huo clan had murdered Empress Xu, Lady Xian finally revealed to her son and grandnephews that she had, indeed, murdered Empress Xu. In fear of what the emperor might do if he had actual proof, Lady Xian, her son, her grandnephews, and her sons-in-law formed a conspiracy to depose the emperor. The conspiracy was discovered, and Emperor Xuan executed the entire Huo clan—an act that later drew heavy criticism from historians for its his ungratefulness to Huo Guang. (e.g., Sima Guang in his Zizhi Tongjian.) (For the time being, Empress Huo was deposed but not executed, but 12 years later she was exiled; in response, she committed suicide.)

== Middle reign ==
During the middle stage of his reign, Emperor Xuan's administration continued to be known for the promotion of honest officials who generally cared for the people. It was also marked by further fostering of relationships with Xiyu kingdoms, making them strong vassals. He was also characterized by attention to detail and willingness to have correspondences with his generals in which he kindly but firmly had concrete discussions with them on proper military strategy in dealing with minority tribes and foreign nations. An example could be seen in his correspondences with General Zhao Chongguo (趙充國) in 62 BC to 60 BC when Zhao was on a mission to pacify the Qiang tribes, some of which were rebelling and some of which were considering a rebellion. Zhao opposed the annihilation strategy that other generals had proposed. Emperor Xuan had initially approved the plan and establish military settlements to better prepare for any future rebellions. Eventually, Emperor Xuan agreed to advocated for better treatment of the tribes, and the Qiang tribes were pacified without any major bloodshed. Also, after a short foray into magic in 61 BC, Emperor Xuan realized the foolishness of seeking immortality and that pursuing it would be a costly venture (unlike his great-grandfather Emperor Wu and many emperors before him).

In 64 BC, Emperor Xuan considered creating a new empress. At that time, his favorite consorts were Consorts Hua, Zhang, and Wei. He was seriously considering making Consort Zhang, the mother of his son Liu Qin (later the Prince of Huaiyang), empress but he was still a bit traumatized over the fact Empress Huo nearly succeeded in poisoning Crown Prince Shi, and fearing that it would happen again if Consort Zhang were to be made empress. He resolved this by choosing to create an empress who did not have a sons of her own, was kind and gentle but hard and strict when time comes and have moral values. He created Consort Wang, not one of his favorites consort, empress, and had her raise Crown Prince Shi as her own son.

That same year, he also changed his name to Xun (詢), to make it easier for the people to carry out "naming taboo" (the avoidance of using the emperor's name in speech or writing in respect of the emperor), because bing and yi were both common characters that were hard to avoid.

In 63 BC, having realized the extent of Bing's contributions to him, Emperor Xuan decided to repay him, and others who were involved in his upbringing, for their kindness. Bing and several others, in addition to Zhang He's adopted son, were created marquesses. The prison guards who had treated him with kindness were also rewarded. His nurses Hu and Guo had already died by this point, but their descendants were tracked down and rewarded.

== Late reign ==
Late in his reign, Emperor Xuan began to moderately become luxurious in living but was still comparatively thrifty in his expenditures. He also began to relax from his early diligence in governing the state. He also became less diligent in the inspection of false reports by officials. For example, there were large numbers of reported sightings of fenghuang (Chinese phoenixes) – mythological birds who were considered symbols of divine favor—during this period, and while in ancient China there might have been "legitimate" sightings of phoenixes (that is, rare birds that were then-considered phoenixes), a good number of these reports were later shown to be likely hoaxes, but Emperor Xuan accepted these reports without critically examining them: although in the case of reported sightings of a green rooster and golden horse in Shu (modern Sichuan), Xuan did dispatch one of his favored poets and a Shu native, Wang Bao, to investigate and to bring back the golden horse, if found (though Wang became ill and died on the way). However, in general, Emperor Xuan's reign, even in this period, was marked by his concern for the people and unwillingness to undertake military action unless necessary. For example, in 59 BC, a major Xiongnu civil war broke out—which would leave the Xiongnu princes fighting each other for years. Many generals wanted to use this opportunity to completely and thoroughly annihilating the Xiongnu. But Emperor Xuan didn't want to do so, rather he encouraged peace among the Xiongnu princes with hopes of having them submit to him.

His efforts paid off. By 56 BC, Xiongnu had been fractured into three separate regimes, ruled by Chanyus Runzhen (閏振), Huhanye (呼韓邪), and Zhizhi. All three sought peace with Han, and Han was able to reduce its military defense forces by a fifth, decreasing the burdens on the people correspondingly. In 54 BC, Chanyu Runzhen was defeated and killed by Chanyu Zhizhi, who further sought to try to defeat Chanyu Huhanye to reunify Xiongnu. In response, in 53 BC, at the advice of his official, Chanyu Huhanye headed south and requested to become a Han vassal to seek Han protection. In 51 BC, Chanyu Huhanye made an official visit to Chang'an as a Han vassal, and Emperor Xuan, correctly judging that he should seek to have Huhanye submit to him out of gratitude and not of fear, ordered that Huhanye not be required to bow to him and that he be treated as higher than imperial princes. Emperor Xuan also commissioned an expedition force to assist Chanyu Huhanye in defending his territory. In 49 BC, Chanyu Huhanye made a second visit. With Han assistance, his strength grew, and Chanyu Zhizhi, who had previously been stronger, was forced to move west.

In 53 BC, disappointed in Crown Prince Shi's overreliance on Confucian officials and lack of resolve, he considered making Liu Qin, the Prince of Huaiyang, the crown prince instead, but could not bring himself to do so—remembering how Prince Shi's mother Empress Xu was his first love and had been murdered by poisoning, and also how he depended on his father-in-law in his youth.

In 51 BC, after Chanyu Huhanye's visit, Emperor Xuan, in his most shining moment, remembered key officials who had been instrumental in his success. In an unprecedented action, he had the portraits of 11 of them be painted onto the main gallery of the main imperial palace, the Weiyang Palace. The 11 officials were:

- Huo Guang
- Zhang Anshi
- Han Zeng (韓增)
- Zhao Chongguo
- Wei Xiang
- Bing Ji
- Du Yannian (杜延年)
- Liu De (劉德)
- Liang Qiuhe (梁丘賀)
- Xiao Wangzhi (蕭望之)
- Su Wu

Huo was referred only by titles and not by name—which was considered an even greater honor than given to the other 10.

By this time, the Western Han dynasty would reach its peak in terms of territorial size, even greater than during the reign of Emperor Wu.

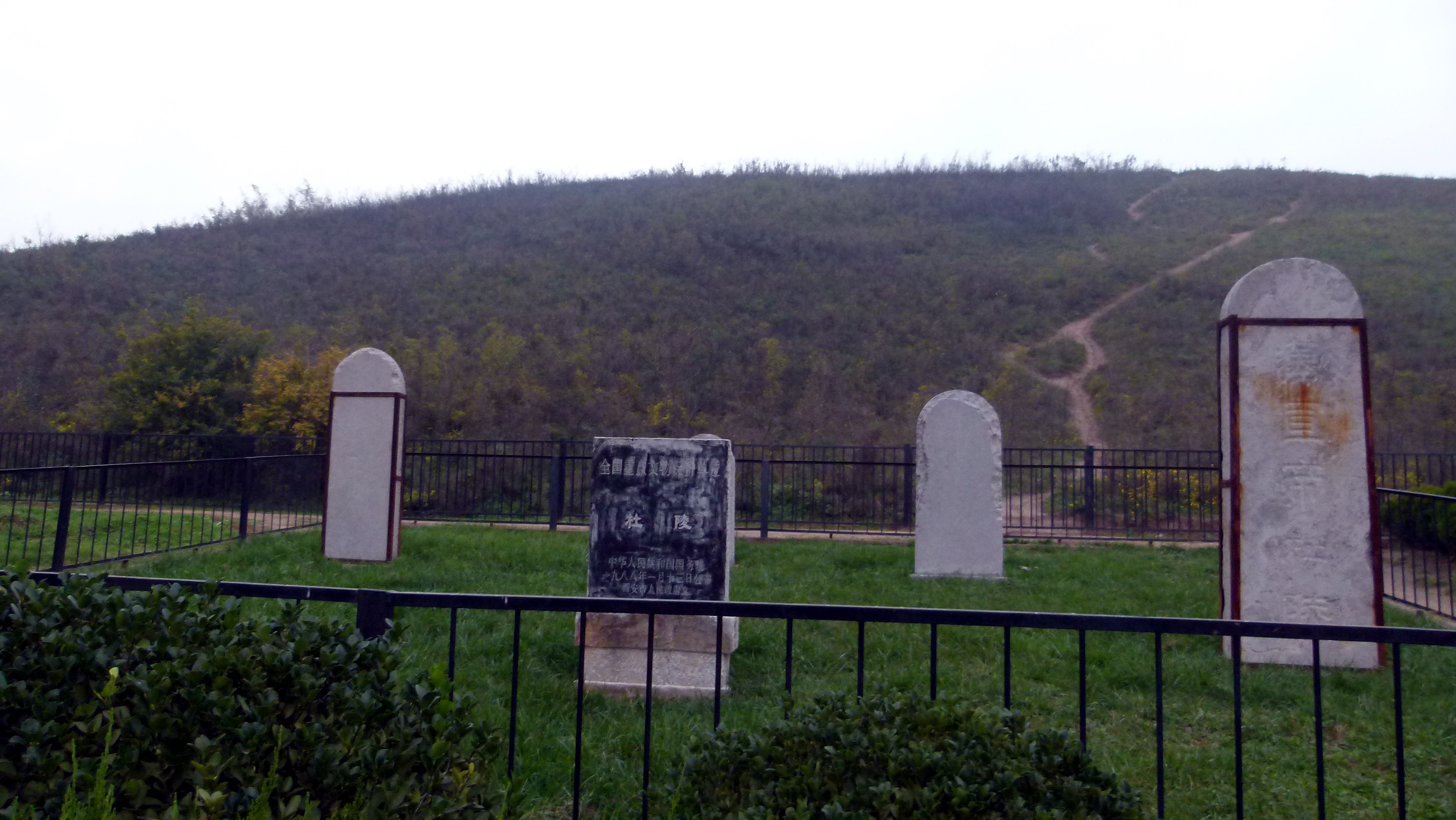
Duling (杜陵), the tomb of Emperor Xuan

Emperor Xuan died in 49 BC. He was succeeded by Crown Prince Shi, as Emperor Yuan. His tomb Duling (杜陵) is located some 15 km southeast of the city of Xi'an.

== Culture ==
Xuan's court was somewhat of a literary center, something which extended to his royal hunts, which he turned into somewhat of a poetry competition for accompanying poets. Among the literary figures at his court were Wang Bao and Liu Xiang.

== Era names ==
- Benshi (本始) 73 BC – 70 BC
- Dijie (地節) 69 BC – 66 BC
- Yuankang (元康) 65 BC – 61 BC
- Shenjue (神爵) 61 BC – 58 BC
- Wufeng (五鳳) 57 BC – 54 BC
- Ganlu (甘露) 53 BC – 50 BC
- Huanglong (黃龍) 49 BC

== Family ==
- Empress Gong'ai, of the Xu clan (恭哀皇后 許氏; 89–71 BC), personal name Pingjun (平君)
  - Liu Shi, Emperor Xiaoyuan (孝元皇帝 劉奭; 75–33 BC), first son
- Empress, of the Huo clan (皇后 霍氏; 87–54 BC), personal name Chengjun (成君)
- Empress Xiaoxuan, of the Wang clan (孝宣皇后 王氏; d. 16 BC)
- Jieyu, of the Zhang clan (婕妤 張氏)
  - Liu Qin, Prince Xian of Huaiyang (淮陽憲王 劉欽; d. 28 BC), second son
- Jieyu, of the Wei clan (婕妤 衛氏)
  - Liu Xiao, Prince Xiao of Chu (楚孝王 劉囂; d. 25 BC), third son
- Jieyu, of the Gongsun clan (婕妤 公孫氏), personal name Zhengshi (徵史)
  - Liu Yu, Prince Si of Dongping (東平思王 劉宇; d. 20 BC), fourth son
- Jieyu, of the Rong clan (婕妤 戎氏)
  - Liu Jing, Prince Ai of Zhongshan (中山哀王 劉竟; d. 35 BC), fifth son
- Jieyu, of the Hua clan (婕妤 華氏)
  - Princess Guantao (館陶公主; b. 71 BC), personal name Shi (施), first daughter
    - Married Yu Yong, Marquis Xiping (於永; d. 20 BC)
- Unknown
  - Princess Jingwu (敬武公主; d. 3)
    - Married Zhang Lin, Marquis Fuping (張臨; d. 33 BC) in 47 BC, and had issue (one son)
    - Married Zhao Qin, Marquis Linping (趙欽; d. 23 BC) in 29 BC
    - Married Xue Xuan, Marquis Gaoyang (薛宣)

== See also ==
- Family tree of the Han dynasty

== Sources ==
- Book of Han, vol. 8.
- Zizhi Tongjian, vols. 24, 25, 26, 27.
- Yap, Joseph P. (2009). Wars With The Xiongnu, A Translation from Zizhi tongjian. AuthorHouse, Bloomington, Indiana, U.S.A. ISBN 978-1-4490-0604-4. Chapters 7–11.

Emperor Xuan of Han House of Liu Born: 91 BC Died: 49 BC
Regnal titles
Preceded by Prince of Changyi	Emperor of China; Western Han; 74–49 BC with Huo Guang (74–68 BC); Grand Empress Dowager Shangguan (74–49 BC)	Succeeded by Emperor Yuan of Han
