= Envoi =

Short stanza at the end of a poem

Envoi or envoy in poetry is used to describe:

- A short stanza at the end of a poem such as a ballad, used either to address an imagined or actual person or to comment on the preceding body of the poem.
- A dedicatory poem about sending the book out to readers, a postscript.
- Any poem of farewell, including a farewell to life.

The word envoy or l'envoy comes from the Old French, where it means '[the] sending forth'. Originally it was a stanza at the end of a longer poem, which included a dedication to a patron or individual, similar to a tornada. More recent examples are dedicatory poems as part of a collection, or an individual poem about farewell or moving on. Envoi is both a type of poem, and is often used as a title. In Japanese waka, an envoi known as a hanka may follow a long poem, or chōka.

== Form ==
The envoi is relatively fluid in form. In ballades and chant royal, envois have fewer lines than the main stanzas of the poem. They may also repeat the rhyme words or sounds used in the main body of the poem, or even whole lines. The envoi can also be a short lyric poem of any form, usually placed at the end of a poetry collection.

== In medieval France ==
The envoi appears in medieval French, in the songs of the trouvères and troubadours. It developed as an address to the poet's beloved or to a friend or patron, and typically expresses the poet's hope that the poem may bring them some benefit (the beloved's favours, increased patronage, and so on).

In the 14th century, the two main forms used in the new literary French poetry were the ballade, which employed a refrain at first but evolved to include an envoi, and the chant royal, which used an envoi from the beginning. The main exponents of these forms were Christine de Pizan and Charles d'Orléans. In the work of these poets, the nature of the envoi changed significantly. They occasionally retained the invocation of the Prince or abstract entities such as Hope or Love as a cryptonym for an authority figure the protagonists(s) of the poem could appeal to, or, in the some poems by d'Orléans, to address actual royalty. However, more frequently in the works of these poets the envoi served as a commentary on the preceding stanzas, either reinforcing or ironically undercutting the message of the poem. Jean Froissart, in his adaptation of the troubadour pastourelle genre to the chant royal form, also employed the envoi. His use, however, is less innovative than that of de Pizan or d'Orléans. Froissart's envois are invariably addressed to the Prince and are used to summarise the content of the preceding stanzas. Since the 14th century, the envoi has been seen as an integral part of a number of traditional poetic forms, including, in addition to the ballade and chant royal, the virelai nouveau and the sestina.

== Later developments ==
In English, poems with envoi have been written by poets as diverse as Austin Dobson, Algernon Charles Swinburne and Ezra Pound. G. K. Chesterton and Hilaire Belloc went through a period of adding envois to their humorous and satirical poems.

Using an envoi as a 'sending-out' poem was already quite typical by the eighteenth and nineteenth century, with poets like Henry Longfellow using the form in the 1890s, and Johann Wolfgang von Goethe writing his 'L'envoi' which he addressed to the reader. Ezra Pound's 'Envoi' to his longer poem Hugh Selwyn Mauberley (1920) begins "Go, dumb-born book", and thus explicitly gives the 'Envoi' title to the long-standing genre of writing a farewell poem addressed to the book of poems itself, previously used for example by Edmund Spenser in The Shepheardes Calender (1579) or Anne Bradstreet in 'The Author to Her Book' (1650s). Later writers such as William Meredith and Meg Bateman have also written envois of this kind.

The envoi is also often written as a postscript or farewell from the poet as they face death, even if that death might be some distance away. Poets who have written envois in this style include Rudyard Kipling, Willa Cather, James McAuley, the suffragist Emily Davison, and Wyn Griffith.

== See also ==
- Tornada (Occitan literary term)
- Waka (classical Japanese poetry)
