= Wu Rui (disambiguation) =

Wu Rui (吳芮) was the King of Changsha during the Han dynasty.

Wu Rui may also refer to:

- Wu Rui (eunuch) (吳瑞), eunuch from Hainan in Lê Dynasty of Vietnam
- Ray Wu (吳瑞), Chinese-born American biologist.
