= Guandi Temple (Gongqingtuan Road) =

Temple in Jinan, Shandong, China

Coordinates: 36°39′51.42″N 117°0′48.38″E

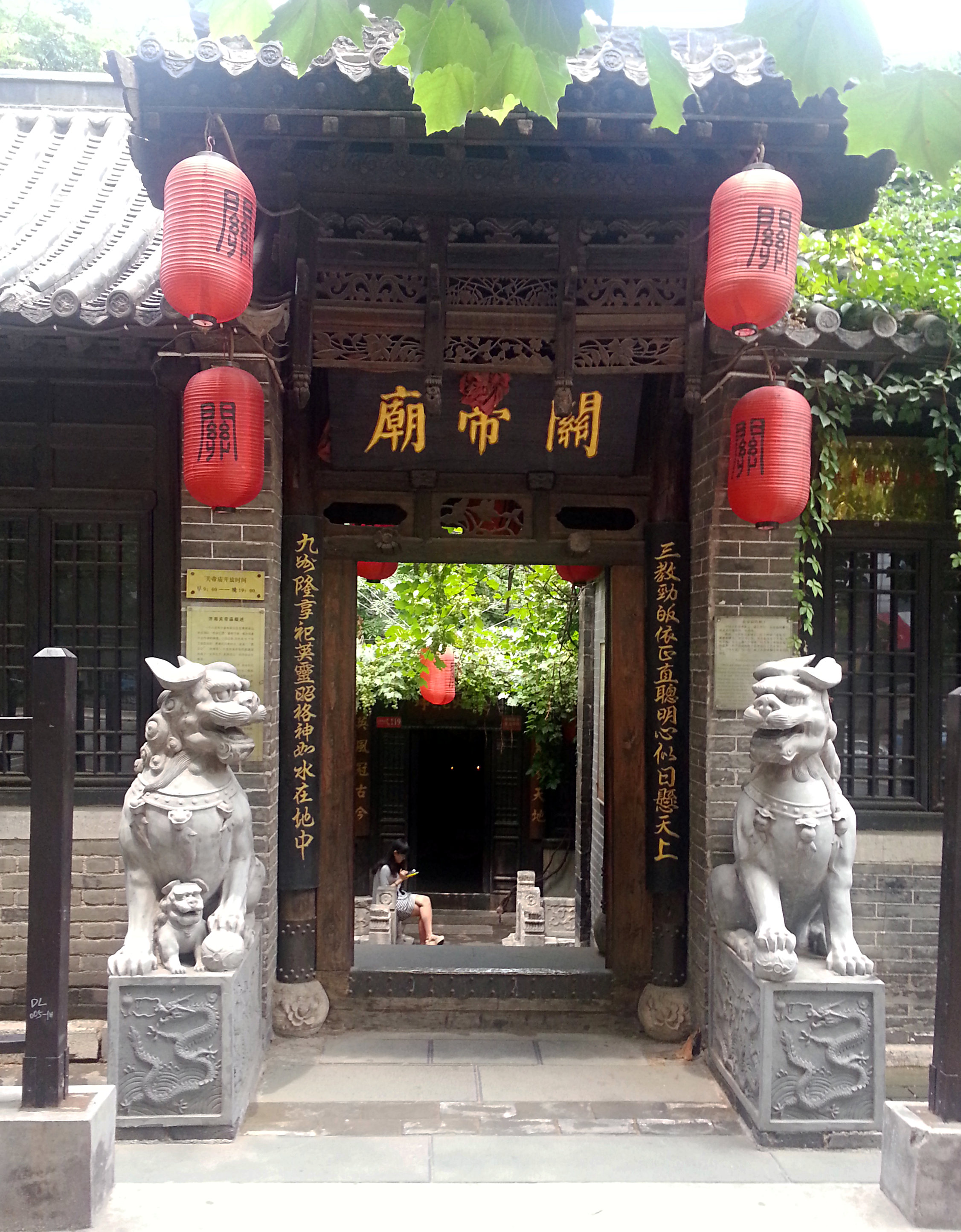
Entrance to the temple

The Guandi Temple on Gongqingtuan Road (Chinese: 共青团路关帝庙; pinyin: Gòngqīngtuán Lù Guāndì Miào) is a historical temple dedicated to Guan Yu in the Tianqiao district of Jinan, Shandong Province, China. It is one of the three best-preserved Guanyu temples in Jinan; the other two are Guandi Temple on Furong Street and Xianxi Alley (县西巷).

== Layout ==
The Ximizhi Spring (Chinese: 西蜜脂泉; pinyin: Xīmìzhī Quán) is the 35th spring listed among Jinan's "seventy-two famous springs" and is part of the Five Dragon Pool spring group. It is located within the courtyard of the temple. The building complex consists of two structures, the Mizhi Hall to the north and the Guandi Temple proper to the south.

== History ==
According to tradition, the grand eunuch An Dehai, a confidant of the Empress Dowager Cixi, was beheaded near the Ximizhi Spring on 12 September 1869 on orders of the governor Ding Baozhen, who followed an edict of the Empress Dowager Ci'an. The execution was believed to be part of a power struggle between the Empress Dowager Cixi and Prince Gong, as An had falsely claimed to be on an imperial mission.

== Location ==
The temple is located on Gongqingtuan Road, west of the Five Dragon Pool.

== See also ==
- List of sites in Jinan
