= An Dehai =

Chinese court eunch (1844–1869)

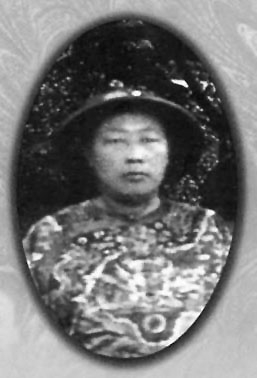
- Born: 1844; Nanpi, Tianjin Prefecture, Zhili Province, Qing China
- Died: 12 September 1869 (aged 24 or 25); Jinan, Shandong Province, Qing China
- Occupation: Palace eunuch
- Known for: Favourite of Empress Dowager Cixi

An Dehai (Chinese: 安德海; pinyin: Ān Déhǎi; Wade–Giles: An Te-hai, 1844 – 12 September 1869) was a palace eunuch at the imperial court of the Qing dynasty. In the 1860s, he became the confidant and favourite of Empress Dowager Cixi and was subsequently executed as part of a power struggle between the empress dowager and Prince Chun.

Before becoming a eunuch, An lived in Wanping Fortress, near Beijing. Empress Dowager Cixi regarded An as her favourite eunuch, and referred to him as "Little An" (小安子). Jung Chang writes in Empress Dowager Cixi (2013) that "Cixi's feelings towards him went far beyond fondness for a devoted servant", and she was "clearly in love" with An. In 1869, Cixi sent An on a mission to the Imperial Textile Factory in Nanjing, to "supervise the procurement" of wedding gowns for Emperor Tongzhi's wedding. On this trip, An travelled on the Grand Canal with a conspicuous display of imperial authority. This was an open violation of palace rules, which prohibited palace eunuchs from leaving the capital without authorisation on the penalty of death, so as to prevent eunuchs from gaining too much power.

When An and his entourage reached Shandong Province, the governor Ding Baozhen reported his behaviour back to the Forbidden City. Led by Prince Chun, who disliked An, the Grand Council ordered the execution of the eunuch. Empress Dowager Ci'an seemed to have supported the decision, whereas Empress Dowager Cixi, who favoured An, did not intervene on the eunuch's behalf. According to one explanation, Empress Dowager Cixi was attending a performance of Beijing opera at the time that the decision was taken and had requested not to be disturbed. As a result, An and six other eunuchs in his entourage were beheaded near the Ximizhi Spring in a Guandi Temple in Jinan. The other members of An's group, including his female relatives and a few musicians, were made slaves and banished to Heilongjiang in the far northeastern corner of the Qing Empire.

After An's execution, a bereaved Cixi had all of his belongings collected, and entrusted them to one of her brothers. One of An's friends, a fellow eunuch, laid the blame for his death on Cixi and was promptly strangled to death as punishment. It has been suggested by historians, including Stephen Haw and Jung Chang, that An's execution was part of, and exacerbated, a broader power struggle between Empress Dowager Cixi and Prince Chun.
