= George N. Kates =

American exponent of classical Chinese culture and decorative arts

George Norbert Kates (November 27, 1895 – March 23, 1990) was an American writer and exponent of classical Chinese culture and decorative arts. His memoir of life in 1930s Beijing—The Years That Were Fat, Peking 1933-1940 is a widely read memoir of pre-revolution China. He also wrote one of the first texts on Chinese classical furniture—Chinese Household Furniture - and put together a private collection of Ming style hardwood furniture.

Kates graduated summa cum laude from Harvard in 1922 and received a D.Phil. from Oxford University in 1930. An officer in the U.S. Army during World War I, he also served with the State Department in China during World War II. From 1947 to 1949 he was Asian Curator at the Brooklyn Museum. Kates published articles about Chinese history and decorative arts and contributed to two books about author Willa Cather. Several authors associate him with Old Beijing, the first half of the 20th century and the traditional way of life. He is also notable as an important collector of Chinese antiques, and for his contributions to the understanding of the Chinese decorative arts.

== Early life ==
Kates was born in Avondale, a suburb of Cincinnati, Ohio on November 27, 1895. His father, Norbert, was an immigrant from the Ukrainian city of Brody. His mother was a second generation American, the child of German immigrants. Both parents were Jewish, although Kates was brought up in a secular household.

In 1896 the family moved to New York City where Norbert Kates built a successful export business, selling manufacturing goods and equipment to Latin American buyers. His work took him on numerous voyages to countries throughout Central and South America. Sometimes the whole family travelled abroad together to Chile, Argentina, Cuba and Mexico. In Mexico City, George briefly attended a German high school.

The Kates family lived in the fashionable and luxurious Ansonia Hotel on Broadway when it opened in 1905 until 1914. Kates attended middle and high school at Horace Mann preparatory school, then at Morningside Heights, New York, and graduated in 1913.

Kates spent two years studying at Columbia University School of Architecture, including a gap year, during which he sailed aboard a Belgian cadet training ship from New York to Cape Town, Calcutta and Melbourne and back again. In 1917, when America entered World War I, Kates enlisted and served as a medical orderly for a year, before being promoted to the rank of second lieutenant and serving as a translator, due to being a fluent speaker of French and German. He did not return home until 1919.

== Harvard, Oxford and Hollywood ==
After a year working in New York City, Kates enrolled at Harvard College in the fall of 1920 to study History and Fine Arts. There he was taught and mentored by Paul Sachs, director of the Fogg Art Museum, and Roger Merriman. Kates joined the Liberal Club and formed a close friendship with Henry Sayles Francis (later Curator of Cleveland Museum of Art) and a number of other prominent students of the arts. As Henry Sayles Francis notes in a letter to Fergus Bordewich: “We both belonged to the Liberal Club where we lunched continuously with a group whom we kept contact most of our lives…certainly for me, my roommate Alexander Mackay-Smith, fellow art majors Henry-Russell Hitchcock, and his [Kates’] roommate, George Kauf Keiser; Charles Poletti, later Lieutenant Governor of New York and John Caddington, today a distinguished genealogist; and among other members Virgil Thompson, his friend Briggs Buchanan, and Henry Wadsworth Longfellow Dana."

Kates was a success personally and academically at Harvard, graduating summa cum laude in 1922. For a brief while he stayed on as a teaching assistant, and then in the fall of 1923 was accepted as a postgraduate student at Oxford University, where he began a doctoral course in the development of French Renaissance Art. His studies, out of necessity, required more time spent on the continent than in Britain, and he spent several years in the Paris archives and on tours of Italian and French museums, castles, and churches, tracing the spread of new ideas in art from 15th century Italy to France. He had great trouble completing the written portion of his work and he returned to Harvard in 1926 with little to show for his efforts. Disillusioned by the prospect of a modestly paid university position and with having to teach, as opposed to do research, Kates sought better paying work. Through his Harvard connections Kates was introduced to Adolph Zukor, head of Paramount Pictures and was hired as a cultural consultant to assist with the accuracy of European movie productions.

In 1927 Hollywood California was geographically isolated and once there Kates felt the loss of his friends, the cultural world of Europe and the East Coast. His work there consisted of selection of settings for filming, props and costumes appropriate to European settings. Paramount was in the process of producing a number of French and German pieces in order to broaden their offerings. Kates worked closely with European actors brought over for some of the productions who spoke no English. He became familiar with many of the stars of the late 1920s and early 1930s such as Clara Bow, Ester Ralston, Olga Baclanova and Buddy Rodgers. Paramount’s Long Island studio in 1931, the East Coast operations were closed down and Kates was left jobless in the midst of the Depression.

== Decision to go to China ==
With limited employment prospects, Kates returned to New England, where he read extensively and developed an interest in Chinese poetry and language, teaching himself Chinese. Although he considered returning to school, a former Harvard professor later offered him a scholarship to study in Beijing and learn the language and culture directly. The decision marked a shift from his earlier focus on European history, art, and languages toward the study of China.

== China 1933 - 1941 ==
Kates’ China years were the most notable and fulfilling of his life. He sailed the long voyage through the Panama Canal to Victoria, BC and onto Tokyo, before finally docking in Shanghai. Once in Beijing Kates enrolled in the Chinese language school and set about the task of mastering both spoken and written Chinese. After a few months, he moved out of the school accommodation and clear of the Foreign Legation Quarter which hosted most of the various expatriate officials and business people. He lived in a succession of Chinese accommodations inside the ‘Tartar City’ which was the central and most historic portion of the Chinese capital, where housing was in a variety of courtyard houses or in Chinese siheyuan. He grew interest in the archaic Chinese lifestyle, which was a world removed from the West and admired the Chinese houses, their simple, Taoistic courtyards, their beautiful furniture and dutiful servants. He spent his days learning Chinese with the help of a tutor who visited him every afternoon for his seven years in China. He delighted in the traders selling goods in the street, with their various ‘cries’, the Chinese food, and simpler lifestyle. He lived an authentic Chinese existence, removed from his Western counterparts. According to the weather and his moods, he would use his mornings to wander around the many Imperial parks and properties that, with the end of Empire in 1911, were now open to the viewing public. He delighted in the Forbidden City and its many courtyards and rich history. He spent many hours enjoying the Imperial Lakes west of the Palace and the various pleasures that came with each season. It was, for him, an idyllic existence.

After several years of study Kates mastered the Chinese language. He briefly attended classes at Beijing University. Then he began his own private studies at the Imperial Archives, exploring the world and the history of the city as it had been during the Qing Dynasty. Through many hours studying ancient texts, time spent on the ground examining the streets, halls, and temples, and interviews of aging princes and eunuchs, Kates built up knowledge of the ancient capital and a substantial body of research materials. He exhibited some of this knowledge in two scholarly articles published at the end of his time in China. In Prince Kung’s Palace and Its Adjoining Garden, (Monumenta Serica, 1940), Kates, who had come to know Prince Pu Ju who lived in the Kung palace, examined the history and the nature of this important princely palace and garden. It is still considered the definitive work in the English language on the subject. In A New Date for the Origins of the Forbidden City (Harvard Journal of Asiatic Studies, 1943), Kates challenged and disproved the accepted fact that the Forbidden City dated from the Ming Dynasty, and showed through his research that the palace was in fact founded in the Yuan. Kates demonstrated where the Yuan palace was located and what remained of it in his day.

Kates was not only scholarly, he also collected. He fell in love with Chinese classical hardwood furniture which had been the furniture of choice for princely and aristocratic families since the 16th century, but had not made its way to the West, and so was virtually unknown by American and European museums and collectors. Kates, and other expats of the period, were able to build collections of these pieces that were being sold off by families that had previously enjoyed Imperial patronage, but were now, in some cases, destitute. The simple, Taoist beauty of these pieces, as they were designed and made during the Ming and early Qing Dynasties was surreal. Made from the finest (mostly imported) woods from India and Southeast Asia, they had a gorgeous patina and delectable grains and the craftsmanship was superb. Kates made a study of the pieces, the woods that were used, and how these pieces were used in Chinese everyday life. He built a modest, but fine collection of pieces he could afford, even though he was existing on very modest resources from various scholarships and awards. He contemplated making a business of importing these fine pieces to America with the help of his sister who was working for a leading New York designer.

In 1935 Kates settled into a Chinese courtyard house of his own. In the company of two faithful servants, he set about establishing a traditional style Chinese household. His three courtyard house became the heart of Kates' Beijing life, and legendary in his literature and among his followers. It was located on Laku Hutong in the northeast corner of the innermost Imperial City. The street and the house had once been part of the various cottage industries set up by Emperor Yong Le to serve the needs of the Palace.

In 1941 with the impending onset of war and the presence of Japanese forces in North China, Kates was forced to leave Beijing unless he was to be interned in a camp. He sailed back to the United States and was able to take his collection of furniture and other Chinese antiques with him.

== War years ==
After the War, at first Kates worked on his articles and began a memoir of his experiences in China, but after his latest fellowship ran out he volunteered for government service and was sent by the State Department to Chongqing in Western China to serve the United States war effort by gathering documents and passing along any intelligence that came his way. He succeeded fellow China scholar John Fairbank in this position, and served there from 1943 to 1945. On his return to America Kates worked on drafting the Chinese portion of the United Nations Charter.

== Life after China ==
After China, Kates, as he himself admitted, struggled to find his place in American life. Leaving China had been a wrenching experience and yet going back after 1945 was a practical impossibility. He had to satisfy himself with his books on the subject. In 1948 Kates published Chinese Household Furniture (Dover) which explained the art form with examples from expat collections from 1930s Beijing, including his own. It was a seminal book on the subject and the basis for future more expansive texts in the decades to come. Kates was recognized in America as being an authority on the subject of classical furniture, and in 1946 he put on a solo exhibition of his own pieces at the Brooklyn Museum which was well received and well done. The museum hired Kates in 1947 to be their Asian Curator, and he stayed there for two years exhibiting more of his own works, and some others of a similar nature, but he did not fit in well with the museum hierarchy or the work, and left despondent in 1949.

In the late 1940s and 1950 Kates published a number of articles in Home and Garden Magazine, examining various aspects of Chinese hardwood furniture. He also gave talks at museums and social clubs for anyone interested in the subject. In 1952 he completed his memoir The Years That Were Fat (Harper). The book was well received by critics, but slow to gain traction. Kates felt as though he had ‘missed the boat’ and that his opus was a failure. However, reader reviews praised the book as being a down-to-earth, authentic and revealing account. Through word of mouth the book’s popularity spread. It was published again in 1967, 1976, 1989 and in 2015. It has come in many ways to symbolize in Western minds the period in Beijing history of which Kates writes—a period fondly remembered by Chinese and expats alike. It is his memoir for which Kates has become best known.

Kates worked on two published essays in the early 1950s, connected with Willa Cather, the 1920s American writer. Kates’ contributions to Willa Cather in Europe; her own story of the first journey, with an introduction and incidental notes by George N. Kates, Knopf (1956), and Willa Cather, Five stories, with an article by George N. Kates on Miss Cather’s last, unfinished, and unpublished Avignon story, Vintage Book (1956) were well done, if perhaps little read.

In 1954 Kates had run out of work and finally income as well. He had a house, but no money for food. He was forced to take drastic action, and that meant selling the majority of his prized collection and getting rid of almost all of his other possessions.

Kates limped through the 1950s with some meagre teaching positions and little income. He was henceforth moving from rented rooms to rented rooms. At one point he was living in New Mexico in a house belonging to China-friend Caroline Bieber. In 1960, at aged 65, he was finally able draw social security and retire. This income combined with a small annuity from the sale of his antiques and some modest royalties from his books saw him through his retirement years. In 1961 Kates moved to Innsbruck, Austria in order to maximize the use of his funds. And there he developed an interest in an obscure Austrian Princess, Eleanor Stuart (1433-1480). Kates found a trove of research material on his princess in Innsbruck where he spent four diverting years.

In 1965 Kates returned to the United States and lived on and off in Boston for the next 15 years. He made frequent trips to Austria and to Scotland, in part continuing his research project. Kates also became a single man at Boston hostesses’ dinner parties. He never married or had children and his romances, whatever they were, were kept well under wraps. Eventually he developed a body of research on Eleanor Stuart, but was unable to interest a publisher in a book and no final manuscript was ever produced.

In 1980 while vacationing in Scotland Kates became sick and was forced to return home. He broke his leg in the Massachusetts General Hospital and was left only partially mobile and with no other option but to move into a retirement home—his traveling days were over. Kates’ nursing home life was understandably frustrating to him. George Kates died on March 23, 1990, aged 94. His ashes were spread in the nearby Atlantic Ocean, as he had wanted.

== Legacy ==
Kates has inspired a number of writers to research and examine his life in China and his work in the area of Chinese antiques. Author Fergus Bordewich went to great length to find and interview Kates’ late in his life in a New England nursing home. Bordewich’s account of his experiences with Kates and finding Kates’ courtyard house during the Communist era form the prelude and the conclusion to his book Cathay. Sarah Handler has written what is perhaps the definitive book on Chinese classical furniture, entitled Austere Luminosity of Chinese Classical Furniture in which she devotes a chapter to Kates and his influence on the genre. Michael Meyer (travel writer) was very much inspired by Kates when he went to Beijing and later wrote of his own experiences living in a courtyard house in The Last Days of Old Beijing. And in 2015 after extensive research a biography of the American scholar entitled A Love Affair with Old Beijing, The Remarkable Life of George Kates, was published. Kates’ furniture collection was dispersed in 1953. Several pieces can be found in the collection of The Cleveland Museum of Art.

== Selected works ==
Kates, George N., Hedda Morrison, The Years That Were Fat: Peking, 1933-1940, Harper (1952) Kates, George N., Chinese Household Furniture, Dover (1948) Kates, George N., Prince Kung’s Palace and Its Adjoining Garden, Monumenta Serica (1940) Kates, George N., A New Date for the Origins of the Forbidden City, Harvard Journal of Asiatic Studies (1943) Cather, Willa, Willa Cather in Europe; her own story of the first journey, with an introduction and incidental notes by George N. Kates, Knopf (1956) Cather, Willa, Five stories. With an article by George N. Kates on Miss Cather’s last, unfinished, and unpublished Avignon story. Vintage Book (1956)

== Bibliography ==
- Acton, Harold, Memoirs of an Aesthete, Viking (1971)
- Acton, Harold, Peonies and Ponies, Chatto & Windus (1941)
- Arlington & Lewisohn, In Search of Old Peking, Oxford University (2001)
- Atwell, Pamela, Obituary – George N. Kates, Journal of Asian Studies (1990)
- Blofeld, John, City of Lingering Splendour, Shambhala (1989)
- Bordewich, Fergus M., Cathay, Prentice Hall (1991)
- Boyd, Julia, A Dance with the Dragon, I.B.Tauris (2012)
- Bredon, Juliet, Peking, Kelly & Walsh (1922)
- Cameron, Nigel, Old Peking Revisited, Formasia Books (2004)
- Cather, Willa, Willa Cather in Europe; her own story of the first journey, with an introduction and incidental notes by George N. Kates, Knopf (1956)
- Cather, Willa, Five stories. With an article by George N. Kates on Miss Cather’s last, unfinished, and unpublished Avignon story. Vintage Book (1956)
- Clayre, Alasdair, The Heart of the Dragon, Houghton Mifflin (1984)
- De Pee, Christian, Cycles of Cathay:Sinology, Philology, and Histories of the Song Dynasty (960–1279) University of Michigan (2012)
- Fang Jing Pei, Treasures of the Chinese Scholar, Weatherhill (1997)
- Handler, Sarah, Austere Luminosity of Chinese Classical Furniture, University of California (2001)
- Kates, George N., Prince Kung’s Palace and Its Adjoining Garden, Monumenta Serica (1940)
- Kates, George N., A New Date for the Origins of the Forbidden City, Harvard Journal of Asiatic Studies (1943)
- Kates, George N., Chinese Household Furniture, Dover (1948)
- Kates, George N., Hedda Morrison, The Years That Were Fat: Peking, 1933-1940, Harper (1952)
- Kidd, David, Peking Story, New York Review Books Classics, (2003)
- Lao She, Rickshaw Boy, Harper Perennial (2010)
- Li, Dray-Novey & Kong, Beijing, Palgrave Macmillan (2009)
- Lowe H.Y, The Adventures of Wu, Princeton University (1983)
- Meyer, Michael, The Last Days of Old Beijing, Walker & Company (2009)
- Meyer, Karl and Blair Brysac, Shareen, The China Collectors, PalgraveMacmillan (2015)
- Morrison, Alistair, Hedda Morrison in Peking: A Personal Recollection, East Asian History (1992)
- Morrison, Hedda, A Photographer in Old Peking, Oxford University (1986)
- Mungello, D.E. Western Queers in China, Rowman & Littlefield (2012)
- Roote, John, A Love Affair with Old Beijing, The Remarkable Life of George Kates, Forbidden City Books (2015)
- Shand-Tucci, Douglass, The Crimson Letter, St. Martin’s Press (2004)
- Strand, David, Rickshaw Beijing, University of California (1989)
- Tsing, Li and Watt, James, editors, The Chinese Scholar’s Studio, Thames & Hudson (1987)
