= Wu Rui (eunuch) =

Chinese eunuch

Chinese name
- Chinese: 吳瑞
Transcriptions
Standard Mandarin
- Hanyu Pinyin: Wú Ruì

Vietnamese name
- Vietnamese alphabet: Ngô Thụy
- Chữ Hán: 吳瑞

Wu Rui was a Hainanese eunuch in 15th century Lê dynasty Đại Việt (modern Vietnam) during Emperor Le Thanh Tong's rule at the Imperial Citadel of Thang Long. He was forcibly castrated and enslaved as a young man by the Vietnamese after his ship was blown off course into Vietnam.

== Life ==
The Vietnamese under Emperor Le Thanh Tong cracked down on foreign contacts and enforced an isolationist policy. A large amount of trade between Guangdong and Vietnam happened during this time. Early accounts recorded that the Vietnamese captured Chinese whose ships had blown off course and detained them. Young Chinese men were selected by the Vietnamese for castration to become eunuch slaves to the Vietnamese. It has been speculated by modern historians that Chinese who were captured and castrated by the Vietnamese were involved in trade between China and Vietnam, and that they were punished after a Vietnamese crackdown on trade with foreign countries. Records show that the Vietnamese performed castration in a painful procedure by removing the entire genitalia with both penis and testicles being cut off with a sharp knife or metal blade. The procedure was agonizing since the entire penis was cut off. The young man's thighs and abdomen would be tied, and others would pin him down on a table. The genitals would be sterilized with pepper water and then cut off. A tube would be then inserted into the urethra to allow urination during healing. Any facial hair such as the beard would fall off and the eunuch's voice would become like a girl's. The eunuchs served as slaves to the Vietnamese palace women in the harem like the consorts, concubines, maids, queen, and princesses, doing most of the work. The only man allowed in the palace was the emperor, the only others allowed were his women and the eunuchs since they were not able to have sexual relations with the women. The eunuchs were assigned to do work for the palace women like massaging and applying make-up to the women and preparing them for sex with the emperor.

A 1499 entry in the Ming Shilu recorded that Wu Rui was one of thirteen Chinese men from Wenchang who were captured by the Vietnamese after their ship was blown off course while traveling from Hainan to Guangdong's Qin subprefecture (modern-day Qinzhou in Guangxi), after which they ended up near the coast of Annam (Dai Viet or Vietnam), during the Chenghua Emperor's rule (1447–1487) . Twelve of them were enslaved to work as agricultural laborers, but since he was the youngest, Wu Rui was selected for castration since he was the only young man and became a eunuch attendant at the Vietnamese imperial palace in Thang Long. After years of service, he was promoted at the death of the Vietnamese ruler in 1497 to a military position in northern Vietnam. A soldier told him of an escape route back to China and Wu Rui escaped to Longzhou. The local chief planned to sell him back to the Vietnamese, but Wu was rescued by the Pingxiang magistrate and then was sent to Beijing to work as a eunuch in the palace.

The Đại Việt sử ký toàn thư records that in 1467 in An Bang province of Dai Viet (now Quảng Ninh Province) a Chinese ship blew off course onto the shore. The Chinese were detained and not allowed to return to China as ordered by Le Thanh Tong. This incident may be the same one where Wu Rui was captured.

Many other Chinese men were also captured by the Vietnamese not long before Wu Rui, a 1472 entry in the Ming Shilu reported that when some Chinese from Nanhai county escaped back to China after their ship had been blown off course into Vietnam, where they had been forced to serve as soldiers in Vietnam's military. The escapees also reported that they found out up to 100 Chinese men remained captive in Vietnam after they were caught and castrated by the Vietnamese after their ships were blown off course into Vietnam. The Chinese Ministry of Revenue responded by ordering Chinese civilians and soldiers to stop going abroad to foreign countries. China's relations with Vietnam during this period were marked by the punishment of prisoners by castration.

Several Malay envoys from the Malacca sultanate were attacked and captured in 1469 by the Lê dynasty of Annam (Vietnam) as they were returning to Malacca from China. The Vietnamese enslaved and castrated the young from among the captured.

== Sources ==
- Cooke, Nola; Li, Tana; Anderson, James, eds. (2011). The Tongking Gulf Through History (illustrated ed.). University of Pennsylvania Press. ISBN 978-0812243369.
- Lary, Diana (2007). Diana Lary (ed.). The Chinese State at the Borders (illustrated ed.). UBC Press. ISBN 978-0774813334.
- Tsai, Shih-Shan Henry (1996). The Eunuchs in the Ming Dynasty (Ming Tai Huan Kuan) (illustrated ed.). SUNY Press. ISBN 0791426874.
- Wade, Geoff (2005), Southeast Asia in the Ming Shi-lu: an open access resource, Asia Research Institute and the Singapore E-Press, National University of Singapore
