= List of senior grand secretaries =

Senior Grand Secretary
- 內閣首輔
- Seal of the Emperor of the Ming dynasty

- Longest serving Yang Shiqi
- Member of: Grand Secretariat
- Appointer: Emperor
- Term length: At His Majesty's Pleasure
- Precursor: Grand Chancellor
- Formation: 1402
- First holder: Xie Jin
- Final holder: Wei Zaode
- Abolished: April 1644

This is a list of Senior Grand Secretary (Chinese: 內閣首輔) of the Ming dynasty in China, who is usually the most senior member in the Grand Secretariat.

Until 1380, the left and right Grand Chancellors were the top ranking officials to advise the emperor. After Hu Weiyong was executed, no other officials were appointed as Grand Chancellor. Xie Jin, who served under the Yongle Emperor, became the first mandarin to be recognised as Senior Grand Secretary.

== List ==
=== Grand Chancellors (before 1380) ===
Left Chancellor (born–died)	Term of office			Right Chancellor (born–died)	Emperor (Reign)	Notes
Left Chancellor (born–died)	Took office	Left office	Time in office, c.	Right Chancellor (born–died)	Emperor (Reign)	Notes
Li Shanchang (1314–1390)	c. Jan; 1368	c. Jan; 1371	3 years	Xu Da (1332–1385)	Hongwu (1368–1398)	
—	c. Jan; 1371	c. Jan; 1373	2 years	Wang Guangyang (?–1379)	Hongwu (1368–1398)	
—	c. Jul; 1373	c. Oct; 1377	4 years, 3 months	Hu Weiyong (?–1380)	Hongwu (1368–1398)	
Hu Weiyong (?–1380)	c. Oct; 1377	c. Jan; 1380	2 years, 3 months	Wang Guangyang (?–1379)	Hongwu (1368–1398)	Executed
Hu Weiyong (?–1380)	c. Jan; 1380	c. Feb; 1380	1 month	—	Hongwu (1368–1398)	Executed

=== Senior Grand Secretaries (after 1402) ===
Portrait	Name (born–died)	Term of office			Emperor (Reign)	Notes
Portrait	Name (born–died)	Took office	Left office	Time in office, c.	Emperor (Reign)	Notes
	Xie Jin (1369–1415)	1402	1407	5 years	Yongle (1402–1424)	
	Hu Guang (1370–1418)	1407	c. June; 1418	11 years	Yongle (1402–1424)	Died in office
	Yang Rong (1371–1440)	1418	1424	6 years	Yongle (1402–1424)	
	Yang Shiqi (1365–1444)	c. Sep; 1424	c. Mar; 1444	19 years, 6 months	Yongle (1402–1424)	
	Yang Shiqi (1365–1444)	c. Sep; 1424	c. Mar; 1444	19 years, 6 months	Hongxi (1424–1425)	
	Yang Shiqi (1365–1444)	c. Sep; 1424	c. Mar; 1444	19 years, 6 months	Xuande (1425–1435)	
	Yang Shiqi (1365–1444)	c. Sep; 1424	c. Mar; 1444	19 years, 6 months	Zhengtong (1435–1449)	Died in office
	Yang Pu (1372–1446)	c. Mar; 1444	c. Jul; 1446	2 years, 4 months	Zhengtong (1435–1449)	Died in office
	Cao Nai (1404–1449)	c. Jul; 1446	c. Aug; 1449	3 years, 1 month	Zhengtong (1435–1449)	Died in office
	Chen Xun (1385–1462)	c. Aug; 1449	c. Jan; 1457	7 years, 5 months	Zhengtong (1435–1449)	
	Chen Xun (1385–1462)	c. Aug; 1449	c. Jan; 1457	7 years, 5 months	Jingtai (1449–1457)	
	Chen Xun (1385–1462)	c. Aug; 1449	c. Jan; 1457	7 years, 5 months	Tianshun (1457–1464)	
	Xu Youzhen (1407–1472)	c. Jan; 1457	c. Jun; 1457	5 months	Tianshun (1457–1464)	
	Xu Bin (1393–1468)	c. Jun; 1457	c. Jul; 1457	1 month	Tianshun (1457–1464)	
	Li Xian (1408–1467)	c. Jul; 1457	c. Mar; 1466	8 years, 8 months	Tianshun (1457–1464)	
	Li Xian (1408–1467)	c. Jul; 1457	c. Mar; 1466	8 years, 8 months	Chenghua (1464–1487)	Mourning
	Chen Wen (1405–1468)	c. Mar; 1466	c. Jun; 1466	3 months	Chenghua (1464–1487)	
	Li Xian (1408–1467)	c. Jun; 1466	c. Jan; 1467	7 months	Chenghua (1464–1487)	Died in office
	Chen Wen (1405–1468)	c. Jan; 1467	c. Apr; 1468	7 months	Chenghua (1464–1487)	Died in office
	Peng Shi (1416–1475)	c. Apr; 1468	c. Mar; 1475	6 years, 11 months	Chenghua (1464–1487)	Died in office
	Shang Lu (1414–1486)	c. Mar; 1475	c. Jul; 1477	2 years, 4 months	Chenghua (1464–1487)	
	Wan An (1418–1489)	c. Jul; 1477	c. Oct; 1487	10 years, 3 months	Chenghua (1464–1487)	
	Liu Ji (1427–1493)	c. Oct; 1487	c. Aug; 1492	4 years, 10 months	Chenghua (1464–1487)	
	Liu Ji (1427–1493)	c. Oct; 1487	c. Aug; 1492	4 years, 10 months	Hongzhi (1487–1505)	
	Xu Pu (1429–1499)	c. Aug; 1492	c. Jul; 1498	5 years, 11 months	Hongzhi (1487–1505)	
	Liu Jian (1433–1526)	c. Jul; 1498	c. Oct; 1506	8 years, 3 months	Hongzhi (1487–1505)	
	Liu Jian (1433–1526)	c. Jul; 1498	c. Oct; 1506	8 years, 3 months	Zhengde (1505–1521)	
	Li Dongyang (1447–1516)	c. Oct; 1506	c. Jan; 1513	6 years, 3 months	Zhengde (1505–1521)	
	Yang Tinghe (1459–1529)	c. Jan; 1513	c. Mar; 1515	2 years, 2 months	Zhengde (1505–1521)	Mourning
	Liang Chu (1451–1527)	c. Mar; 1515	c. Nov; 1517	2 years, 8 months	Zhengde (1505–1521)	
	Yang Tinghe (1459–1529)	c. Nov; 1517	c. Mar; 1524	6 years, 4 months	Zhengde (1505–1521)	
	Yang Tinghe (1459–1529)	c. Nov; 1517	c. Mar; 1524	6 years, 4 months	Jiajing (1521–1567)	
	Jiang Mian (1463–1532)	c. Mar; 1524	c. Jun; 1524	3 months	Jiajing (1521–1567)	
	Mao Ji (1463–1545)	c. Jun; 1524	c. Jul; 1524	1 month	Jiajing (1521–1567)	
	Fei Hong (1468–1535)	c. Jul; 1524	c. Mar; 1527	2 years, 8 months	Jiajing (1521–1567)	
	Yang Yiqing (1454–1530)	c. Mar; 1527	c. Oct; 1529	2 years, 7 months	Jiajing (1521–1567)	
	Zhang Cong (1475–1539)	c. Oct; 1529	c. Aug; 1531	1 year, 10 months	Jiajing (1521–1567)	
	Zhai Luan (1477–1546)	c. Aug; 1531	c. Oct; 1531	2 months	Jiajing (1521–1567)	
	Li Shi (1471–1539)	c. Oct; 1531	c. Apr; 1532	6 months	Jiajing (1521–1567)	
	Zhang Cong (1475–1539)	c. Apr; 1532	c. Aug; 1532	4 months	Jiajing (1521–1567)	
	Li Shi (1471–1539)	c. Aug; 1532	c. Apr; 1533	8 months	Jiajing (1521–1567)	
	Zhang Cong (1475–1539)	c. Apr; 1533	c. May; 1535	2 years, 1 month	Jiajing (1521–1567)	
	Li Shi (1471–1539)	c. May; 1535	c. Jul; 1535	2 months	Jiajing (1521–1567)	
	Fei Hong (1468–1535)	c. Jul; 1535	c. Oct; 1535	3 months	Jiajing (1521–1567)	
	Li Shi (1471–1539)	c. Oct; 1535	c. Dec; 1538	3 years, 2 months	Jiajing (1521–1567)	Died in office
	Xia Yan (1482–1548)	c. Dec; 1538	c. May; 1539	5 months	Jiajing (1521–1567)	
	Gu Dingchen (1473–1540)	c. May; 1539		0 months	Jiajing (1521–1567)	
	Xia Yan (1482–1548)	c. May; 1539	c. Aug; 1541	2 years, 3 months	Jiajing (1521–1567)	
	Zhai Luan (1477–1546)	c. Aug; 1541	c. Oct; 1541	2 months	Jiajing (1521–1567)	
	Xia Yan (1482–1548)	c. Oct; 1541	c. Aug; 1542	10 months	Jiajing (1521–1567)	
	Zhai Luan (1477–1546)	c. Aug; 1542	c. Aug; 1544	2 years	Jiajing (1521–1567)	
	Yan Song (1480–1565)	c. Aug; 1544	c. Jan; 1546	1 year, 5 months	Jiajing (1521–1567)	
	Xia Yan (1482–1548)	c. Jan; 1546	c. Feb; 1548	2 years, 1 month	Jiajing (1521–1567)	
	Yan Song (1480–1565)	c. Feb; 1548	c. Jun; 1562	14 years, 4 months	Jiajing (1521–1567)	
	Xu Jie (1503–1583)	c. Jun; 1562	c. Jul; 1568	6 years, 1 month	Jiajing (1521–1567)	
	Xu Jie (1503–1583)	c. Jun; 1562	c. Jul; 1568	6 years, 1 month	Longqing (1567–1572)	
	Li Chunfang (1511–1585)	c. Jul; 1568	c. May; 1571	2 years, 10 months	Longqing (1567–1572)	
	Gao Gong (1513–1578)	c. May; 1571	c. Jul; 1572	1 year, 2 months	Longqing (1567–1572)	
	Zhang Juzheng (1525–1582)	c. Jul; 1572	c. Jun; 1582	9 years, 11 months	Longqing (1567–1572)	
	Zhang Juzheng (1525–1582)	c. Jul; 1572	c. Jun; 1582	9 years, 11 months	Wanli (1572–1620)	Died in office
	Zhang Siwei (1526–1585)	c. Jun; 1582	c. May; 1583	11 months	Wanli (1572–1620)	Mourning
	Shen Shixing (1535–1614)	c. May; 1583	c. Oct; 1591	8 years, 5 months	Wanli (1572–1620)	
	Wang Jiaping (1536–1603)	c. Oct; 1591	c. Apr; 1592	6 months	Wanli (1572–1620)	
	Zhao Zhigao (1524–1601)	c. Apr; 1592	c. Feb; 1593	10 months	Wanli (1572–1620)	
	Wang Xijue (1534–1614)	c. Feb; 1593	c. Jun; 1594	1 year, 4 months	Wanli (1572–1620)	
	Zhao Zhigao (1524–1601)	c. Jun; 1594	c. Sep; 1601	7 years, 3 months	Wanli (1572–1620)	Died in office
	Shen Yiguan (1537–1615)	c. Sep; 1601	c. Aug; 1606	4 years, 11 months	Wanli (1572–1620)	
	Zhu Geng (1535–1608)	c. Aug; 1606	c. Dec; 1608	2 years, 4 months	Wanli (1572–1620)	Died in office
	Ye Xianggao (1559–1627)	c. Dec; 1608	c. Sep; 1614	5 years, 9 months	Wanli (1572–1620)	
	Fang Congzhe (1562–1628)	c. Sep; 1614	c. Dec; 1620	6 years, 3 months	Wanli (1572–1620)	
	Fang Congzhe (1562–1628)	c. Sep; 1614	c. Dec; 1620	6 years, 3 months	Taichang (1620)	
	Liu Yijing (1567–1635)	c. Dec; 1620	c. Nov; 1621	11 months	Taichang (1620)	
	Liu Yijing (1567–1635)	c. Dec; 1620	c. Nov; 1621	11 months	Tianqi (1620–1627)	
	Ye Xianggao (1559–1627)	c. Nov; 1621	c. Aug; 1624	2 years, 9 months	Tianqi (1620–1627)	
	Han Kuang (1566–1644)	c. Aug; 1624	c. Dec; 1624	4 months	Tianqi (1620–1627)	
	Zhu Guozhen (1557–1632)	c. Dec; 1624	c. Jan; 1625	1 month	Tianqi (1620–1627)	
	Gu Bingqian (1550–?)	c. Jan; 1625	c. Oct; 1626	1 year, 9 months	Tianqi (1620–1627)	
	Huang Liji (1568–1637)	c. Oct; 1626	c. Dec; 1627	1 year, 2 months	Tianqi (1620–1627)	
	Shi Fenglai (1563–1642)	c. Dec; 1627	c. Apr; 1628	4 months	Tianqi (1620–1627)	
	Shi Fenglai (1563–1642)	c. Dec; 1627	c. Apr; 1628	4 months	Chongzhen (1620–1627)	
	Li Guopu (1585–1631)	c. Apr; 1628	c. Jun; 1628	2 months	Chongzhen (1620–1627)	
	Lai Zongdao (1571–1638)	c. Jun; 1628	c. Jul; 1628	3 months	Chongzhen (1620–1627)	
	Li Biao (1582–1636)	c. Jul; 1628	c. Dec; 1628	8 months	Chongzhen (1620–1627)	
	Han Kuang (1566–1644)	c. Dec; 1628	c. Feb; 1630	1 year, 2 months	Chongzhen (1620–1627)	
	Li Biao (1582–1636)	c. Feb; 1630	c. Apr; 1630	2 months	Chongzhen (1620–1627)	
	Cheng Jiming (1559–1635)	c. Apr; 1630	c. Oct; 1630	6 months	Chongzhen (1620–1627)	
	Zhou Yanru (1593–1644)	c. Oct; 1630	c. Jul; 1633	3 years	Chongzhen (1620–1627)	
	Wen Tiren (1574–1638)	c. Jul; 1633	c. Jun; 1637	3 years, 11 months	Chongzhen (1620–1627)	
	Zhang Zhifa (1573–1642)	c. Jun; 1637	c. May; 1638	11 months	Chongzhen (1620–1627)	
	Kong Zhenyun (1574–1644)	c. May; 1638	c. Jul; 1638	2 months	Chongzhen (1620–1627)	
	Liu Yuliang (1594–1642)	c. Jul; 1638	c. Mar; 1639	8 months	Chongzhen (1620–1627)	
	Xue Guoguan (1582–1641)	c. Mar; 1639	c. Jul; 1640	1 year, 4 months	Chongzhen (1620–1627)	
	Fan Fucui (1580–1658)	c. Jul; 1640	c. Jun; 1641	11 months	Chongzhen (1620–1627)	
	Zhang Sizhi (?–?)	c. Jun; 1641	c. Oct; 1641	4 months	Chongzhen (1620–1627)	
	Zhou Yanru (1593–1644)	c. Oct; 1641	c. Jun; 1643	1 year, 8 months	Chongzhen (1620–1627)	
	Chen Yan (1600–1644)	c. Jun; 1643	c. Mar; 1644	9 months	Chongzhen (1620–1627)	
	Jiang Dejing (1593–1646)	c. Mar; 1644	c. Apr; 1644	1 month	Chongzhen (1620–1627)	
	Wei Zaode (1605–1644)	c. Apr; 1644		0 months	Chongzhen (1620–1627)	Died after captured
