= Yang Jisheng (Ming dynasty) =

Chinese statesman

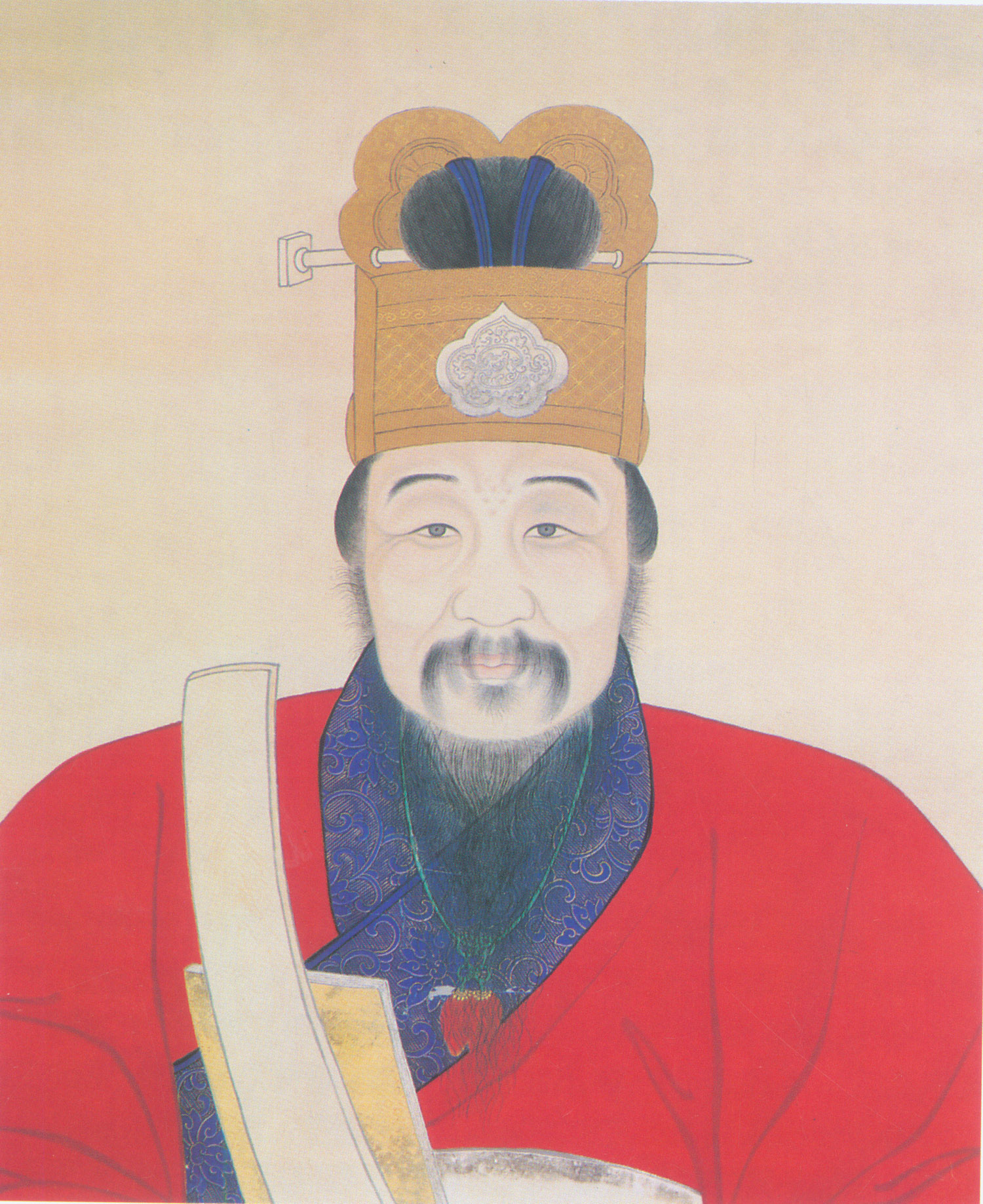
- Born: 16 June 1516; Beihezhao, Rongcheng County, Ming China
- Died: 12 November 1555 (aged 39); Beijing, Ming China
- Other names: Yang Zhongfang, Yang Jiaoshan, Yang Zhongmin
- Known for: being executed during the reign of the Jiajing Emperor for criticizing Yan Song

Yang Jisheng
- Traditional Chinese: 楊繼盛
- Simplified Chinese: 杨继盛
Transcriptions
Standard Mandarin
- Hanyu Pinyin: Yáng Jìshèng
- Wade–Giles: Yang^{2} Chi^{4}-sheng^{4}

Zhongfang
- Chinese: 仲芳
Transcriptions
Standard Mandarin
- Hanyu Pinyin: Zhòngfāng

Jiaoshan
- Chinese: 椒山
Transcriptions
Standard Mandarin
- Hanyu Pinyin: Jiāoshān

Zhongmin
- Chinese: 忠愍
Transcriptions
Standard Mandarin
- Hanyu Pinyin: Zhōngmǐn

Yang Jisheng (Chinese: 楊繼盛; 16 June 1516 – 12 November 1555) was a Chinese court official of the Ming dynasty who held multiple posts during the reign of the Jiajing Emperor. He is remembered as a political opponent of Yan Song, on whose initiative he was arrested and eventually executed. His death, widely perceived as unjust, was followed by significant posthumous veneration of his memory during the late imperial era.

In his lifetime, Yang Jisheng was known by the courtesy name Zhongfang (仲芳), but frequently used the art name Jiaoshan (椒山, "Pepper Mountain"). He was also granted the posthumous name Zhongmin (忠愍).

== Early life ==
Yang Jisheng was born on 16 June, 1516, in the village of Beihezhao, located in Rongcheng County. The son of Yang Fu and Cao Shi, he was the youngest of three brothers, the elder two being named Jichang and Jimei. His early life was troubled by domestic disputes, as hostility grew between Madame Cao and his father's concubine Chen who had given birth to Jimei. As a result, the Yang family home was split at least once; the situation worsened after his mother's death, during which time Yang Jisheng began working as a cowherd when he was only seven years old.

From an early age, Yang Jisheng received education from a variety of local teachers while simultaneously seeking employment to support his family. At the age of ten, after the death of his father, Yang Jisheng spent the winter managing the finances of a wealthy household, replacing his brother Jichang in that job. He was able to participate in the local civil service examinations for the first time in 1533; while he failed at his first attempt, he successfully passed in the summer, allowing him to apply for and enter the local government school that same year. As a young man he received several offers from wealthy families to marry one of their daughters, but declined all of them in order to marry Zhang Zhen, the niece of his father's concubine Chen, who was closer to his social position and whose virtue he personally admired. They were married in November 1534. Their marriage would produce two sons, named Yingwei and Yingji, and a daughter.

In 1536, despite the sudden death of his favorite teacher, Yang Jisheng placed highly at the county-level exams. He did not pass the provincial exams in 1537 and was unable to make a second attempt for several years. A sudden outbreak of illness in his village caused him to drop his studies in order to care for his family, and shortly before the 1540 exams he was forced to come home and deal with a lawsuit brought by corrupt members of a wealthy family who had succeeded in getting his brother Jichang thrown in prison. After securing his brother's release and finally passing the provincial exams in 1540, he unsuccessfully attempted the metropolitan exam in 1541, and then began attending the National University. He also became closely acquainted during this time with the senior court official Xu Jie, who mentored him. He was successful in passing both the metropolitan and palace examinations with high marks in 1547 along with such notables as the future statesman Zhang Juzheng and the renowned writer Wang Shizhen (zh:王世贞), the latter of whom became a lifelong friend.

== Career ==
The beginning of Yang Jisheng's career coincided with prolonged debate over the correct response to raids conducted by Altan Khan. After factional struggle that led to the ouster and execution of war hawks Zeng Xian and Xia Yan, official policy focused on diplomatically engaging with the Mongol nomads by opening horse markets which would hopefully lead to a long-term trade relationship. This strategy was championed by Yan Song, a minister who was now on the ascendant in Ming political circles and who had become hugely influential over the Jiajing Emperor.

Upon achieving the jinshi degree, Yang Jisheng was posted to the Ministry of Personnel in Nanjing, where he studied with the elderly statesman and music theorist Han Banqi. By 1551, he had returned to Beijing to take a post at the Ministry of War, where he was privy to discussions on foreign affairs. Shortly after his arrival, he submitted a memorial to the throne highlighting ten reasons why the opening of horse markets was bad for the state, and five fallacies in the common arguments supporting rapprochement with Altan Khan. Although the Jiajing Emperor was initially in favor of the proposal, it was criticized harshly by the party of Yan Song. Consequently, Yang Jisheng was arrested by the Embroidered Uniform Guard and beaten before being demoted and sent to Didao (狄道, now Lintao, Gansu province) to serve as a low-ranking judicial official.

One of the first things that he did while posted to Didao was to found a school for the promotion of Confucian values. To maintain the school, Yang used his personal funds to purchase considerable land which was divided into a section growing produce for the students and a section composed of individual plots to be rented out for poorer farmers, providing both income for the school and land for the less affluent members of the community. He was successful in opening a coal mine through diplomatic engagement with the residents of the mountain where the mine was located, performing public rituals to appease the local spirits. His tenure in Didao was additionally marked by an anti-corruption campaign against wealthy families that were attempting tax evasion.

Following the failure of the diplomatic response to Altan Khan, Yang Jisheng was recalled from Didao a year after being sent into exile. He received multiple promotions in rapid succession until he was once again appointed to serve the Ministry of War in Beijing.

== Downfall ==
In the early hours of 2 December, 1553, as he recorded in his autobiography, Yang Jisheng stayed up late thinking about his sudden rush of good fortune. His wife, Madame Zhang, approached him to ask about his thoughts; Yang responded by declaring his intention to somehow repay the state for all of the good things which it had bestowed upon him. This sentiment was questioned by his wife, who asked, "With a corrupt official like Yan Song in power, how will he allow you to recompense the nation?" Versions of this scene by different writers often portray Madame Zhang as expressing more passive sentiments by simply urging her husband to retire, as Yan Song's position was seemingly unassailable. Regardless, this conversation galvanized Yang Jisheng into action, as he resolved to submit a second memorial to the throne, this time specifically impeaching the behavior of Yan Song.

Although he listed specific examples of crimes and abuses committed by Yan Song which he wished to expose, Yang Jisheng made the unfortunate mistake of advising the emperor to consult with his two sons, the imperial princes, in order to independently confirm the truth. This was interpreted as an attempt to meddle in court politics, and Yang Jisheng was arrested for the second time by the Embroidered Uniform Guard. He was imprisoned and beaten severely in order to determine if he was part of some larger conspiracy. The effects of this judicial torture took a heavy toll on Yang Jisheng's body. Although he was sent python's gall by his friend, Wang Zhigao (zh:王之誥), to mitigate the pain, Yang replied, "I have my own gall, what need is there for this snake's?" Using pieces of broken ceramic, he was able to treat the severe damage that he had received to his legs by piercing his skin and cleaning the pus from his wounds.

The continuing imprisonment of Yang Jisheng was an embarrassment to the Ming court and was widely discussed by literary circles. According to Yang's old friend Wang Shizhen, there were so many copies of the famous memorial condemning Yan Song being circulated that it caused the cost of paper to rise. Several petitions and appeals were made to the Jiajing Emperor requesting clemency, and it seemed that the emperor was reluctant to execute him given his previous loyal service. However, Yan Song was determined that Yang was to die, and so covertly added his name to the warrant that was used to execute Zhang Jing. The Jiajing Emperor signed the warrant without reading it thoroughly and thus accidentally authorized the execution of Yang Jisheng.

While waiting for death, Yang Jisheng wrote a set of final instructions containing practical and moral advice for his wife and his two sons. Among his requests were that his concubine, with whom he had not fathered children, be found a worthy husband to support her, and that his sons should be virtuous and take care of the family. He wrote in particular praise of his wife, asking that she raise their daughter in an exemplary manner and urging her not to commit suicide. These recommendations were probably heeded; the literary tradition of Zhang Zhen killing herself in order to join her husband is not uncommon in fictional accounts but is entirely unsupported by historical documents.

Yang Jisheng also took the extraordinary step of composing a nianpu, or literary chronicle, about his own life. His memoirs were largely modeled after the example of Wen Tianxiang, who had written a similar text while imprisoned by the Yuan dynasty.

The evening before his execution, Yang Jisheng wrote a poem which was preserved on monuments and in later accounts of his life. It reads:

鐵肩擔道義
辣手著文章

— Yang Jisheng
Translation:

Bear righteousness and the Way on a shoulder of iron,
Write with a peppery hand.

— Kenneth Hammond (trans.)

== Legacy ==
Herbert Giles, in his 1901 review A History of Chinese Literature, declared of Yang Jisheng that "his name has no place in literature," and only mentions him in passing to introduce the text of a petition written to the emperor by his wife. This is a minority view, as Yang Jisheng has been the subject of numerous literary works.

Following his official posthumous rehabilitation, Yang Jisheng was the subject of laudatory biographies by former allies Wang Shizhen and Xu Jie, who generally praised his conduct, and was memorialized in an elegy by his wife, who addressed him as a "hero of eternity." He was also the subject of considerable works in Chinese theater. The play Baojian ji (寶劍記, "Record of the Precious Sword") by Li Kaixian was widely viewed as an echo of Yang Jisheng's career despite being written prior to his traumatic career and death, as it depicted a young official being silenced by a corrupt senior minister. Its influence can be seen in the later play Mingfeng ji (鳴鳳記, "The Phoenix's Cry"), a straightforward fictionalization of Yang Jisheng's life. The authorship of Mingfeng ji is uncertain, although it has traditionally been attributed to Wang Shizhen as he was Yang Jisheng's most prominent contemporary advocate.

The early rulers of the Qing dynasty embraced the history of Yang Jisheng and sought to preserve his memory for their own political ends. The Shunzhi Emperor issued imperial edicts commemorating Yang's life, and was so fond of the play Mingfeng ji that he commissioned an adaptation of that play from the author Ding Yaokang (zh:丁耀亢). The new play, published in 1657 was officially titled Biaozhong ji (表忠記, "Record of Manifesting Loyalty") but was better known as Ranshe dan (蚺蛇膽, "The Python's Gall") after the climactic scene in which Yang Jisheng refuses the offered medicine. In 1658, the Shunzhi Emperor commissioned Wu Qi (吳綺) to write another play, Zhongmin ji (忠愍記, "Record of Zhongmin"), which was privately performed for the emperor but not printed. Decades later, the Qianlong Emperor personally wrote three poems about the life of Yang Jisheng, praising his steadfast loyalty in the face of death.

Since imperial times, political dissidents have often identified with the memory of Yang Jisheng. Along with Fang Xiaoru and Yu Qian, Yang Jisheng was remembered as one of the "three exceptional men" by the controversial philosopher Li Zhi. Before being executed in 1927, Li Dazhao, co-founder of the Chinese Communist Party, invoked Yang's memory by writing Yang's final poem, modifying the first character of the second line to "妙" ("skillful") from the original "辣" ("peppery"):

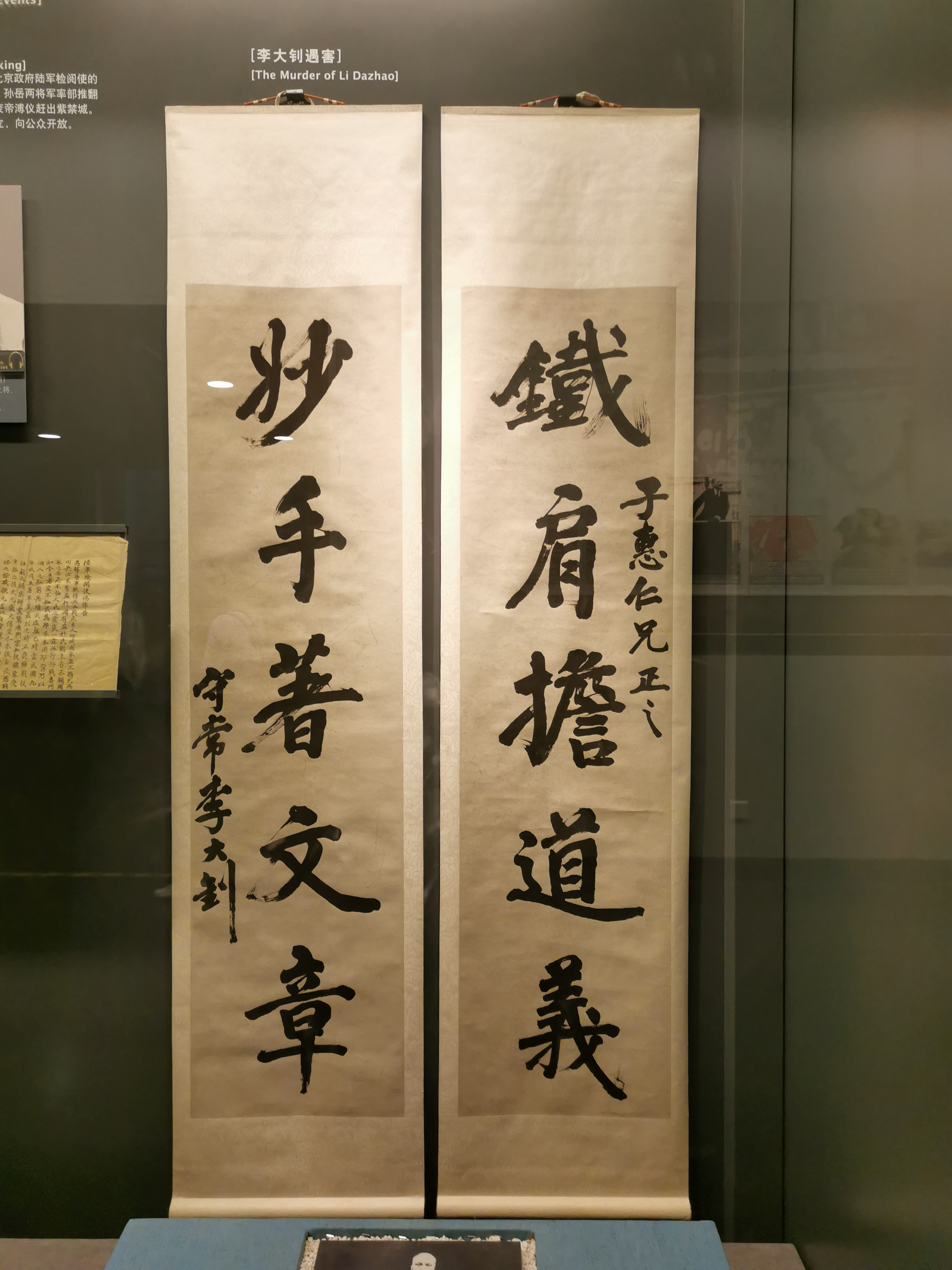
Li Dazhao's final poem

鐵肩擔道義
妙手著文章

— Li Dazhao
Translation:

Bear righteousness and the Way on a shoulder of iron,
Write with a skillful hand.

Henri Maspero recorded that Yang Jisheng was honored as a tutelary deity for the city of Beijing. Popular veneration and remembrance of Yang Jisheng took place at multiple shrines and temples across the country, including in his former Beijing home and in his natal village of Beihezhao. In Beijing, the Songyun'an (松筠庵, "Bamboo and Pine Cloister"), where Yang lived, briefly passed into obscurity but received a boost in popularity after a 1786 survey of the city revealed its historical significance. The Songyun'an survived the Cultural Revolution heavily damaged, and since 1984 has been officially listed by the city's Cultural Relics Bureau. Also preserved at the site are historic monuments and the remains of a tree which was said to have been planted by Yang Jisheng while he was in prison, and which was brought down by a powerful storm in 1953.

A shrine to Yang Jisheng has stood in Beihezhao since 1567, when his name was officially cleared by imperial edict. The original shrine was expanded and maintained over the centuries until it was completely destroyed in 1967 at the hands of the Red Guards. Funds were raised by the Yang family to establish a smaller building on the spot of the original shrine, which was completed in 1997.

Many relics of Yang Jisheng's life did not survive the Cultural Revolution. In 2004, a single antique guqin crafted by Yang Jisheng during his years of musical study went up for auction in Beijing. Its quality, and the fact that it was possibly owned at some point by the artist Zheng Xie, led the Rongbaozhai art dealers to estimate its value as between 600,000 and 1,000,000 yuan.
