= Qiu Luan =

Chinese general (1505–1552)

Qiu Luan (Note: Chinese: 仇鸾; Chinese: 仇鸞; pinyin: Qiú Luán) (Note: Courtesy name: Boxiang (Chinese: 伯翔; pinyin: Bóxiáng)) (1505 – 31 August 1552) was a Chinese general who served in the Ming dynasty during the reign of the Jiajing Emperor. He was active on the Sino-Mongolian border and held the position of commander-in-chief of the border troops from 1550 to 1552.

== Biography ==
Qiu Luan was born during China's Ming dynasty into a family of hereditary officers in Zhenyuan County, Shaanxi (in present-day part of Gansu). His grandfather, Qiu Yue (仇鉞; 1465–1521), was appointed Count of Xianning (咸寧) and later Marquis for his involvement in suppressing the rebellion of the Prince of Anhua in 1510. Qiu inherited the title in 1522.

In 1524, he was among the officials who supported the Jiajing Emperor in the Great Rites Controversy. The Emperor immediately appointed him as commander of one of the twelve divisions of the Ming army stationed in the Beijing area. After five years, he was promoted to commander of the troops in the southern Chinese provinces of Guangdong and Guangxi. However, due to illness, he requested a recall in 1534. He resigned before receiving the Emperor's approval and was subsequently fined three months' salary.

In 1539, Qiu was appointed as the commander of an upcoming punitive expedition to Đại Việt (present-day northern Vietnam). He accompanied the Emperor on his journey to his birthplace in Huguang as one of the deputy commanders of the entourage. However, in 1540, when he arrived in Guangxi to take command of the expeditionary forces and develop a plan of operation, he encountered conflict with the provincial commander of Guangdong, Liu Xun (柳珣), who held the title of Marquis of Anyuan (安遠侯). In October 1540, the Emperor dismissed Qiu and appointed Liu as the commander of the expedition. The expedition was ultimately cancelled in June 1541.

In 1543, Qiu was appointed as assistant commissioner of the left chief military commission. The following year, he was given the responsibility of overseeing the regional border command in Gansu. However, his superior, Zeng Xian, who was the commander of the three frontier headquarters in Shaanxi, including the Gansu headquarters, viewed him as a corrupt and incompetent officer. In the winter of 1547, Zeng pushed for Qiu's removal and arrest. This was due to a dispute over the advance against the Mongols in Ordos. However, in the spring of 1548, Zeng lost the Emperor's trust, which Qiu used to criticize him. At the same time, Zeng's supporter, the influential Grand Secretary Xia Yan, was also targeted. Qiu allegedly had the support of Yan Song, who was Xia's rival in the Grand Secretariat. Qiu was eventually freed from his charges.

In 1548–1549, the Mongols, led by Altan Khan, conducted raids that brought them within a day's journey of the Ming capital, Beijing. They even reached the imperial tombs located near the city. Altan Khan issued a warning to the Ming authorities, stating that they would attack Beijing if they did not agree to mutual trade.

In July 1550, Zhang Da (張達), the commander of the important border fortress of Datong, was killed in battle with the Mongols. Qiu was appointed as his successor. However, instead of engaging in direct combat with the Mongols, Qiu chose to bribe them to move further east along the border. He then retreated from Datong to the Juyong Pass, which was closer to Beijing. By the end of September, the Mongols had reached the Gubeikou, which was only 65 km northeast of Beijing. From there, they continued south to Tongzhou (at the northern end of the Grand Canal), where they set up camp. On 30 September, the Mongol vanguard arrived in Beijing and the following day, they burned the suburbs and began to lay siege to the city.

The garrison of the capital consisted of 140,000 men, but only 50,000 to 60,000 were capable of combat. The remaining soldiers were assigned to construction sites. However, the reinforcements were lacking in supplies and equipment, rendering the army unable to effectively defend against the Mongols. The eunuchs, whose estates were destroyed in the northeast of the city, turned against the officials. This angered the Emperor, who responded by executing the minister of war on 6 October.

Qiu was able to bring his soldiers to help from the Juyong Pass the day after the arrival of the Mongols. The Emperor favored him and appointed him commander-in-chief of the defense of the entire north with the title of great general pacifying the north (平北大將軍; Pingbei dajiangjun). However, there was no provision for his soldiers in Beijing, so they had to find their own supplies in the surrounding areas, just like the Mongols. After a while, the Mongols plundered the surrounding areas and retreated to the north. Qiu followed them at a safe distance and unexpectedly encountered them north of Changping. In the ensuing battle, he lost over a thousand men but still claimed victory.

In January 1551, Qiu brought a reinforcement of sixty thousand soldiers from the borderlands to Beijing for training. At the same time, he was given the title of commander of military affairs of Beijing (縂督京營戎政; zongdu jingying rongzheng) and was responsible for commanding all the troops in the Beijing region. These troops were newly organized into three corps, totaling almost 150,000 soldiers.

In April 1551, a delegation from the Mongols, led by Toghto, the adopted son of Altan Khan, once again requested the restoration of trade, specifically for horses. Both Qiu and Yan agreed to this, but only as a means to buy time. Qiu did not want to engage in any conflict with the Mongols at all. The Mongols ceased their attacks and instead began trading horses for silk in the markets of Datong and Yanning. They soon requested grain in exchange for cattle and sheep. The Jiajing Emperor put a stop to further trading, citing concerns about security. The Mongols resumed their marauding raids during the winter of 1551–1552.

In the spring of 1552, Altan Khan launched another attack, and in April, he defeated Qiu's troops at Datong. By this time, Qiu had already lost the support of Yan and Lu Bing (陸炳), (Note: Lu Bing was a commander of the Embroidered Uniform Guard, which served as a secret police and intelligence agency in the Ming dynasty.) and he offered his resignation, which was ultimately rejected. He fell ill in August, was relieved of his command at the end of the month, and died a few days later. He was posthumously accused of treason for his dealings with the Mongols, and his family and the officers involved in the negotiations were executed.
