= Shao Yuanjie =

Chinese Taoist (1459–1539)

- 邵元節
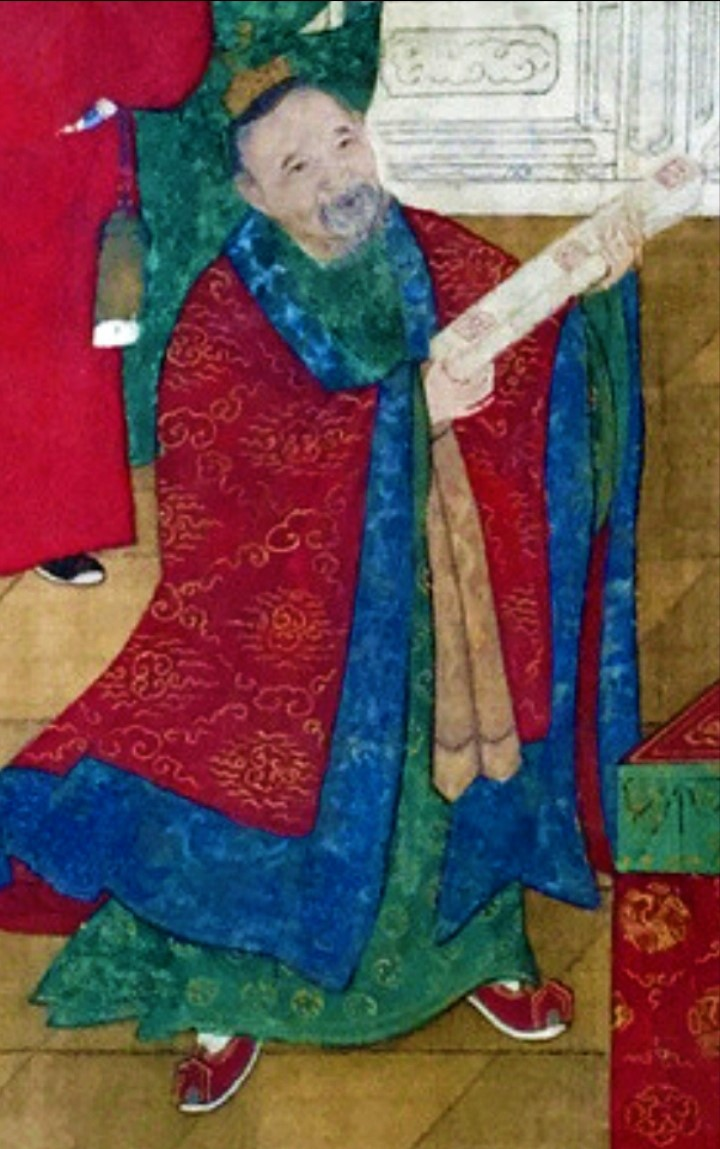
- Born: 1459; Guixi, Jiangxi
- Died: 1539 (aged 79–80); Beijing
- Occupation: Taoist

Chinese name
- Traditional Chinese: 邵元節
- Simplified Chinese: 邵元节
Transcriptions
Standard Mandarin
- Hanyu Pinyin: Shào Yuánjié

Shao Yuanjie (Note: Shao Yuanjie used the courtesy name Zhongkang (仲康) and the art names Xueya (雪崖; 'Snowy Cliff') and Taihezi (太和子; 'Master of Great Harmony').) (1459–1539) was a Chinese Taoist priest and a close confidant of the Jiajing Emperor.

== Biography ==
Shao Yuanjie was from Guixi County in the southern Chinese province of Jiangxi. He was a member of the Zhengyi school of Taoism. At the young age of thirteen, he arrived at Mount Longhu, where he quickly gained a strong reputation within the local Taoist community. In 1524, he was summoned to the court of the Jiajing Emperor. There, he served as a specialist in rituals to ensure rain and snow, heirs, and the overall cosmic order. The Emperor had been without a son for a long time, but after the birth of his first son (the eldest died young in 1533, and the second was born in 1536), Shao was greatly honored. He earned the Emperor's trust and support, and was given the responsibility of overseeing Taoist monasteries and appointing their leaders. In recognition of his contributions, he was bestowed with high titles (zhenren, meaning "perfected person") and was granted the first official rank. He was also formally given the title of minister of rites and received a generous salary, as well as 40 soldiers from the imperial guard to serve him. The Emperor even had a Taoist monastery built for Shao in his hometown. As a further show of appreciation, Shao's parents and relatives were also rewarded with ranks and titles. The Emperor and his court greatly valued Shao for his extensive knowledge and understanding of the ceremonies that were crucial in establishing and maintaining the order of the world.

In 1539, the Emperor traveled to central China, but Shao was too ill to accompany him. Instead, he recommended another Taoist, Tao Zhongwen, to take his place. Shao died shortly afterwards. He was buried with great honors and the Emperor even granted him a posthumous name, which was uncommonly four characters instead of the usual two. After the Jiajing Emperor's death, the new regime revoked the posthumous titles and honors bestowed upon Shao.

His work, The Collected Works of Great Harmony (太和文集, Taihe wenji), has been lost.
