= Tao Zhongwen =

Chinese Taoist (1481–1560)

- 陶仲文
- Born: 1481; Huanggang, Hubei
- Died: 1560 (aged 78–79); Beijing
- Occupation: Taoist

Chinese name
- Chinese: 陶仲文
Transcriptions
Standard Mandarin
- Hanyu Pinyin: Táo Zhòngwén

Tao Zhongwen (Note: Tao Zhongwen's courtesy name was Dianzhen (典真).) (1481–1560) was a Chinese Taoist priest and a close confidant of the Jiajing Emperor. A minor official in Hubei and Liaodong, Tao gained imperial favor in 1538 after being recommended to the Emperor as an expert in Taoist rituals, talismans, and exorcisms. Following the death of Shao Yuanjie, the Emperor's previous Taoist adviser, Tao became the Jiajing Emperor's chief Taoist confidant and rose to considerable influence at court. He was granted prestigious titles, including the honorary rank of minister of rites and the title of Count of Gongcheng, and became closely associated with Grand Secretary Yan Song. Tao played a significant role in promoting religious practices and rituals at the imperial court, influencing the Emperor's decisions on succession, state affairs, and the pursuit of longevity. After the Jiajing Emperor's death in 1567, Tao's honors were revoked by the new Longqing Emperor, and his family faced punishment for their association with the former ruler's religious policies.

== Biography ==
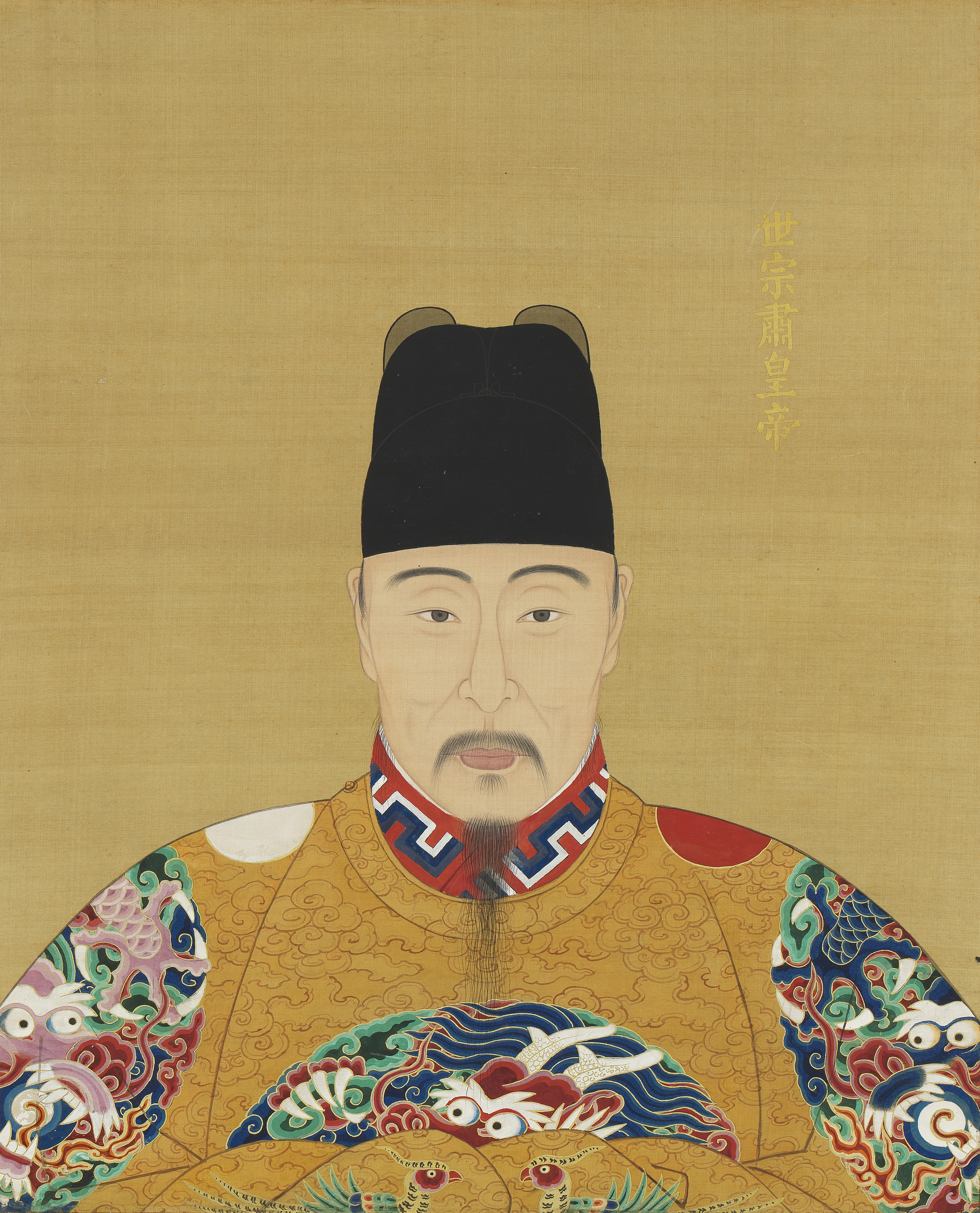
Portrait of the Jiajing Emperor

Tao Zhongwen was born around 1481 in Huanggang Prefecture, located in northern China's Hubei Province. He held positions as an assistant official and storekeeper in Huangmei in Hubei, and Liaoyang in Liaodong. During this time, he became acquainted with Shao Yuanjie, a Taoist priest and the chief confidant of the Jiajing Emperor, who was knowledgeable in Taoist practices. In 1538, Shao recommended Tao to the Emperor as an expert in talismans, incantations, and exorcisms. Gradually, Tao gained the Emperor's trust and support.

In 1539, the Emperor traveled to central China. Shao was too ill to accompany him and recommended Tao as his replacement. During the journey, Tao predicted a fire at the Emperor's temporary residence, which impressed the Emperor and earned him recognition and confidence in his abilities. Shao died shortly after, and Tao then took over Shao's position as the Emperor's chief Taoist confidant. He was appointed as the Taoist patriarch, head of all Taoist monasteries, (Note: He was granted the title of Immortal, Patriarch of Taoism of the State, and Chief Abbot of all Monasteries.) and was responsible for keeping records of Taoist priests and monks. In 1540, the heir apparent Zhu Zairui contracted smallpox, a disease that was often fatal during this period, but recovered rapidly. Historical accounts attributed his recovery to Tao's prayers and Taoist medical treatments. That same year, he was given the (honorary) title of minister of rites; his wife was also granted a high rank. Over time, he received all three titles of the "Three Solitaries", (Note: In 1540, he was granted the honorary title of junior guardian (少保), followed by the titles of junior tutor (少傅) and junior preceptor (少師) in 1544.) the honorary titles of grand master for splendid happiness (光祿大夫) and Pillar of the State (柱國), and in 1550, the title of Count of Gongcheng (恭誠伯). In 1542, he was able to secure the dismissal of Minister of War Liu Tianhe (劉天和), who had initially refused to receive him. This was made possible through his strong alliance with Grand Secretary Yan Song.

After Zhu Zairui's death in 1549, the Emperor turned to Tao for support, believing in the effectiveness of his prayers and rituals. Tao also gained the Emperor's favor by advising him not to appoint an heir apparent, arguing that "two dragons"—the reigning emperor and his designated successor—should not see each other, lest the spirits cast a jealous eye on the heir. This advice suited the Jiajing Emperor, who was reluctant to draw attention to his poor health by naming a successor while still middle-aged.

After 1545, the Emperor began to rely on fortune-telling organized by Tao for state affairs. Tao's ally Yan Song also participated in fortune-telling, seeing it as a way to influence policy in the desired direction. Tao prepared elixirs for the Emperor that were believed to extend his life, including one made from the blood of a virgin's first menstruation. To obtain this ingredient, he gathered hundreds of young virgins in the West Park, along with vermilion and other ingredients. (Note: The Chinese of that time considered crystallized urine and amber (which they regarded as dragon semen) to be equally potent substances. The Emperor also used both.) Officials criticized these elixirs, which also contained lead and arsenic, as being poisonous, but their concerns were ignored.

Tao had several disciples and followers, and his sons were also recognized and given positions of honor. Tao Shitong (陶世同), probably the eldest son, served as an assistant to the Court of Imperial Sacrifices. Tao Shi'en (陶世恩), probably his second son, was appointed as deputy head of the Office of Imperial Seals and later also served as an assistant to the Court of Imperial Sacrifices. Another son, Tao Shichang (陶世昌), studied at the Imperial University, while yet another son held the position of company commander in the Embroidered Uniform Guard. Even Tao's more distant relatives held positions in various offices.

In 1559, Tao resigned from his position. He died in November 1560. After his death, the Emperor struggled to find a suitable Taoist adept to replace him. Before his death, Tao submitted a memorial in humble terms and returned many gifts to the Emperor, including jade and gold valuables, as well as 10,000 liang (373 kg) of silver. The Emperor deeply mourned his death and bestowed on him the highly esteemed four-character posthumous name Rongkanghuisu (榮康惠肅), as he had done for Shao, rather than the customary two-character form.

When the Jiajing Emperor died in 1567, he was succeeded by his third son, the Longqing Emperor. The new emperor and his ministers stripped Tao Zhongwen and Shao Yuanjie of all posthumous honors and imprisoned the late emperor's physicians, who had prepared drugs which were intended to prolong his life but had apparently shortened it instead. Tao's son Tao Shi'en was among those arrested. They were sentenced to death, but in 1570, the sentence was reduced to exile beyond the Great Wall. Grand Secretary Gao Gong recalled that Tao had assisted him in the early 1560s when he was seeking payment of his pension. Nevertheless, the state confiscated the Tao family's assets.
