= Zhao Zhigao =

Senior Grand Secretary
- Monarch: Wanli
- Preceded by: Wang Xijue

Personal details
- Born: 1524
- Died: 1601 (aged 76–77)

Zhao Zhigao (Chinese: 趙志皐, 1524–1601) was a Chinese politician who served as senior grand secretary in the Grand Secretariat during the reign of the Wanli Emperor. He was born in Lanxi County, Zhejiang Province.

Prior to his appointment as senior grand secretary, Zhao served as Minister of Rites. In 1591, the Wanli Emperor appointed him to the senior grand secretary position without consulting other officials, a decision that drew criticism from Minister of Personnel Lu Guangzu and other court officials who argued it violated proper procedure.

Zhao played a significant role during the Japanese invasions of Korea (1592–1598), where he was part of the "dove" faction that favored diplomatic solutions over military action. His political rivalry with Xing Jie, the supreme commander during the second stage of the war, exemplified the court political divisions that influenced Ming decision-making during the conflict.
