= Zhai Luan =

Chinese official (1477–1546)

- 翟鑾

Senior Grand Secretary
- In office 1531
- Monarch: Jiajing
- Preceded by: Zhang Cong
- Succeeded by: Zhang Cong
- In office 1541
- Monarch: Jiajing
- Preceded by: Xia Yan
- Succeeded by: Xia Yan
- In office 1542–1544
- Monarch: Jiajing
- Preceded by: Xia Yan
- Succeeded by: Yan Song

Grand Secretary
- In office 1527–1533, 1540–1544
- Monarch: Jiajing

Personal details
- Born: 1477 Beijing
- Died: 16 November 1546 (aged 68–69)
- Education: jinshi degree (1505)

Chinese name
- Traditional Chinese: 翟鑾
- Simplified Chinese: 翟銮
Transcriptions
Standard Mandarin
- Hanyu Pinyin: Zhái Luán

Zhai Luan (Note: Zhai Luan used the courtesy name Zhongming (仲鳴) and the art name Shimen (石門).) (1477 – 16 November 1546) was a Chinese scholar-official during the Ming dynasty. He rose to power in the 1520s, holding important positions in the state administration such as vice minister of rites and later minister of personnel. He also served as grand secretary from 1527 to 1544, with intermittent breaks.

== Biography ==
Zhai was born in Beijing in 1477, during China's Ming dynasty, into a family from Zhucheng County, Shandong, with a long history of service in the Embroidered Uniform Guard. He received a Confucian education and successfully passed the civil service examinations, including the provincial examinations in 1498 and the metropolitan and palace examinations in 1505, earning the rank of jinshi.

After passing the examinations, he was assigned to the Hanlin Academy as a bachelor (Shujishi), and in 1506 he was promoted to junior compiler (Bianxiu). He was transferred to the position of secretary in the Ministry of Justice, but soon returned to the academy. After the accession of the Jiajing Emperor in 1521, he was promoted to the post of vice minister of rites. He was one of the scholars who lectured to the Emperor on Confucian teachings, gaining his trust and support. He also strengthened the Emperor's favor by using his literary talent to compose poems on the occasion of auspicious omens (which were reported to Beijing by officials from all over the country). In 1527, he was transferred to the Ministry of Personnel as a vice minister. That same year, he was appointed grand secretary, making him one of the Emperor's closest aides. As grand secretary, he was one of the less prominent officials, concentrating on routine matters, and devoting himself mainly to military matters.

He left his position as grand secretary in 1533. In 1539, the Emperor appointed him to a one-year inspection tour of the northern frontier. During this time, Zhai made significant improvements to the border defenses by organizing the construction of fortifications and recognizing and rewarding capable officers. He returned to his role as grand secretary in 1540. He served as senior grand secretary in 1531, 1541, and 1542–1544.

Two out of Zhai's three sons passed the Beijing provincial civil service examinations, and in 1544, they also passed the metropolitan examinations, along with their teacher and another relative. Their success was met with suspicion from some examiners, who accused them of cheating. The Emperor ordered an investigation into the circumstances of the examinations. Zhai responded by requesting a re-examination of the accused, which angered the Emperor. The Emperor believed that Zhai had interfered improperly in the investigation. The investigation uncovered several irregularities in the conduct of the examinations, including bribery by members of the examination board. The commissioners were dismissed and punished, with some being dismissed from civil service and others receiving up to 60 lashes. Although no evidence was found against Zhai's sons, the Emperor still excluded them from future examinations and dismissed Zhai from his position and the civil service. His colleague in the Grand Secretariat, Yan Song, was suspected of orchestrating the accusations against Zhai. Zhai and his family did not hold him responsible and maintained a friendly relationship with him.

Zhai died on 16 November 1546. In 1567, as part of the general rehabilitation of officials affected during the Jiajing Emperor's reign, he was rehabilitated and given the posthumous name Wenyi (文懿).
