= Xia Yan (Ming dynasty) =

Chinese official (1482–1548)

- 夏言

Senior Grand Secretary
- In office 1538–1539
- Monarch: Jiajing
- Preceded by: Li Shi
- Succeeded by: Gu Dingchen
- In office 1539–1541
- Monarch: Jiajing
- Preceded by: Gu Dingchen
- Succeeded by: Zhai Luan
- In office 1541–1542
- Monarch: Jiajing
- Preceded by: Zhai Luan
- Succeeded by: Zhai Luan
- In office 1545–1548
- Monarch: Jiajing
- Preceded by: Yan Song
- Succeeded by: Yan Song

Grand Secretary
- In office 1536–1539, 1539–1541, 1541–1542, 1545–1548
- Monarch: Jiajing

Minister of Rites
- In office 1531–1537
- Monarch: Jiajing
- Preceded by: Li Shi
- Succeeded by: Yan Song

Personal details
- Born: 1482
- Died: 31 October 1548 (aged 65–66)
- Education: jinshi degree (1517)

Chinese name
- Chinese: 夏言
Transcriptions
Standard Mandarin
- Hanyu Pinyin: Xià Yán

Xia Yan (Note: Xia Yan used the courtesy name Gongjin (公謹) and the art name Guizhou (桂洲).) (1482 – 31 October 1548) was a Chinese scholar-official during the Ming dynasty. He held a high position in the court of the Jiajing Emperor in the mid-16th century, serving as minister of rites from 1531 to 1537 and later as grand secretary. He also intermittently served as head of the Grand Secretariat from 1538 to 1548.

Xia was born in Guixi County in the southern Chinese province of Jiangxi and passed the highest level of civil service examinations, known as the palace examination, in 1517. This marked the beginning of his civil service career. He started as an supervising secretary in the Office of Scrutiny of the Ministry of War and later in the Office of Scrutiny of the Ministry of Personnel. He was known for his meticulousness, consistency, energy, and fearlessness in politics. In 1530, his proposals for ceremonial reforms caught the attention and favor of the Jiajing Emperor, leading to his promotion to the ministry of rites and later to the position of grand secretary. As minister and grand secretary, he pursued a decisive and aggressive foreign policy, but played a less prominent role in domestic politics. While he initially enjoyed the Emperor's favor, he gradually lost it due to his disagreement with the Emperor's excessive focus on Taoist ceremonies. He also refused to adapt to the Emperor's changing positions on political matters, which further strained their relationship. In 1548, he definitively lost the Emperor's support and was removed from office, arrested, and executed due to disagreements over the defense of the northwest border.

== Early life ==
Xia Yan was born in Beijing, the capital of China's Ming dynasty, in 1482. His family originated from Guixi, present-day county-level city in Yingtan, Jiangxi Province, and was registered as a military household. Xia Yan's uncle served in the military in Beijing, where his close relatives, including his father, Xia Ding (夏鼎), lived with him. Xia Ding studied Confucianism and pursued a career in the civil service. He passed the provincial examinations in 1480 and the metropolitan and palace examinations in 1496, earning the jinshi degree. He subsequently served as a prefectural judge in Yanzhou, Zhejiang, and as a county magistrate in Linqing, Shandong. He died in Linqing in 1506.

Following in his father's footsteps, Xia Yan studied Confucianism and passed the provincial civil service examinations in 1510, but failed the metropolitan examinations in 1511 and 1514. He subsequently enrolled at the Imperial University. In 1517, he passed the metropolitan and palace examinations, earning the jinshi degree.

== Early career ==
After passing the examinations, Xia Yan began his official career as a messenger. In 1520, Xia was promoted to supervising secretary in the Office of Scrutiny of the Ministry of War. After the Jiajing Emperor ascended to the throne in 1521, he played a role in the purge of officials accused of corruption and excesses during the previous reign of the deceased Zhengde Emperor (r. 1505–1521). He specifically targeted Minister of Personnel Wang Qiong, whom he accused of accepting bribes from the Prince of Ning (who had risen in 1519 and occupied part of Jiangxi Province; the uprising was quickly suppressed by Wang Yangming, then the grand coordinator in southern Jiangxi), of allying with eunuchs close to the Zhengde Emperor, and of suppressing criticism of honorable dignitaries. He also made similar accusations against Minister of War Wang Xian. However, these accusations were false; in reality, Wang Qiong had actually supported Wang Yangming and indirectly contributed to the defeat of the Prince of Ning. Wang Qiong was opposed by Grand Secretary Yang Tinghe, the most influential figure in the government during the early 1520s. Yang was able to get the young Jiajing Emperor to dismiss both Wang Qiong and Wang Xian. As part of the widespread purges of civil and military offices, Xia was tasked with vetting officers, with a focus on relatives and supporters of the Zhengde Emperor's close eunuchs and favorites. With his usual meticulousness and consistency, he compiled a list of 3,199 individuals whom he proposed to strip of their offices and ranks, but only a portion of them were actually dismissed, which Xia protested against three years later. In an attempt to avoid a large-scale purge, the Emperor responded by ordering a further investigation of the files of those involved, effectively putting the matter on hold. Xia reacted strongly, stating, "We are shocked at this directive and we don't know what to do... The security of the state is involved here". He immediately protested against the appointment of unsuitable individuals as officers, such as the younger brothers of the Jiajing Emperor's nurses to the Embroidered Uniform Guard, stating that he was "shocked" by the repetition of negative practices from the Zhengde Emperor's regime.

In addition to the military purge, Xia was also involved in land reform in and around Beijing and North Zhili. Due to the poor fertility of the land and the difficult farming conditions in the floodplains, small farmers were initially exempt from taxes in the early Ming dynasty. However, as time passed, they gradually lost their land to the Emperor's favorites, influential eunuchs, aristocrats, and officials who were interested in it for tax benefits. After the death of the Zhengde Emperor, Yang Tinghe and his political allies confiscated approximately one-tenth of the 1.4 million hectares of such land from the late emperor's favorites. This land was then returned to the small farmers as part of corrective reforms and campaigns against the Zhengde Emperor's favorites. Xia believed that the scope of these confiscations was insufficient and protested, but the government did not consistently respond to his concerns when affected eunuchs and aristocrats, with the Emperor's support, were able to reclaim their confiscated property.

In June 1524, Xia's mother died, causing him to resign for the obligatory year's mourning and return home to Guixi. Due to the intense political disputes between the Emperor and the government, he did not immediately return to his civil service duties. It was not until late spring of 1528 that he finally arrived in Beijing and resumed his previous position as supervising secretary in the Office of Scrutiny of the Ministry of War. Towards the end of the year, he was tasked with evaluating the performances of those involved and resolving the aftermath of the unrest in Shanxi Province. Specifically, in Lingchuan County in the southeast of Shanxi, a group of bandits led by members of the Chen family had been causing havoc since the early 1520s. This group, consisting of several dozen to hundreds of armed men, had been terrorizing several counties on the border of Shanxi and Hebei. Despite multiple attempts by local authorities to defeat the bandits, they were unsuccessful. Even negotiations with the bandits proved futile. It was not until the autumn of 1528, after months of preparation, that a coordinated attack from four directions finally succeeded in dispersing the bandits and freeing the captured civilians (the bandits had kidnapped 2,300 people in order to use them for labor and to replenish their ranks before the final attack). Xia then evaluated all the officials and officers involved in the elimination of the bandits, and did not hesitate to criticize the failure to distinguish between hardened bandits and peasants who were forced to collaborate with them. He also condemned the commanders who delayed intervention in hopes of a worsening situation, more casualties, and a higher enemy death toll to report. During his several-month journey to the region, he organized the return of the captives to their homes and provided aid to the affected population. He also developed a detailed plan for the administrative reorganization of the area, which included establishing a new county in a remote mountain valley where the bandits had settled, elevating a large subprefecture to a full prefecture, and allocating a sufficient police force. In the new county, he planned the size and distribution of police patrols, fortification of the crossings into Henan Province, and reconstruction of roads. The plan also required capable officials to be appointed to the county and prefecture offices. After consulting with the ministries, the Emperor approved Xia's proposals.

After returning to Beijing, Xia was promoted to chief supervising secretary in the Office of Scrutiny of the Ministry of Personnel in 1529. In an attempt to gain high office and attract the attention of the Jiajing Emperor, he decided to take advantage of the Emperor's interest in rituals and ceremonies; he drafted a project to reform the ceremonies of offerings to Heaven and Earth, which were performed annually by the Emperor, and submitted it to him in February 1530. The Emperor welcomed the proposal and sought consultation on it. Huo Tao, one of the Emperor's supporters, who had opposed similar reforms in the early 1520s, continued to oppose the proposal even after the Emperor asked him to reconsider. The Emperor had him arrested, but he was released a month later after he withdrew his opposition. With the support of the majority, the proposal was eventually implemented, resulting in the separation of the offerings to Heaven and Earth in the ceremonies.

== Minister of Rites ==
In 1531, the Jiajing Emperor appointed Xia as the minister of rites. As minister of rites, he was responsible for organizing imperial rituals and ceremonies, foreign relations, state Confucian schools, and civil service examinations, as well as managing the affairs of the imperial family. He held this position until January 1537. Senior Grand Secretary Zhang Cong saw Xia as a rival for the Emperor's favor and attempted to discredit him. Despite Zhang's efforts, Xia maintained his position and the support of the Emperor.

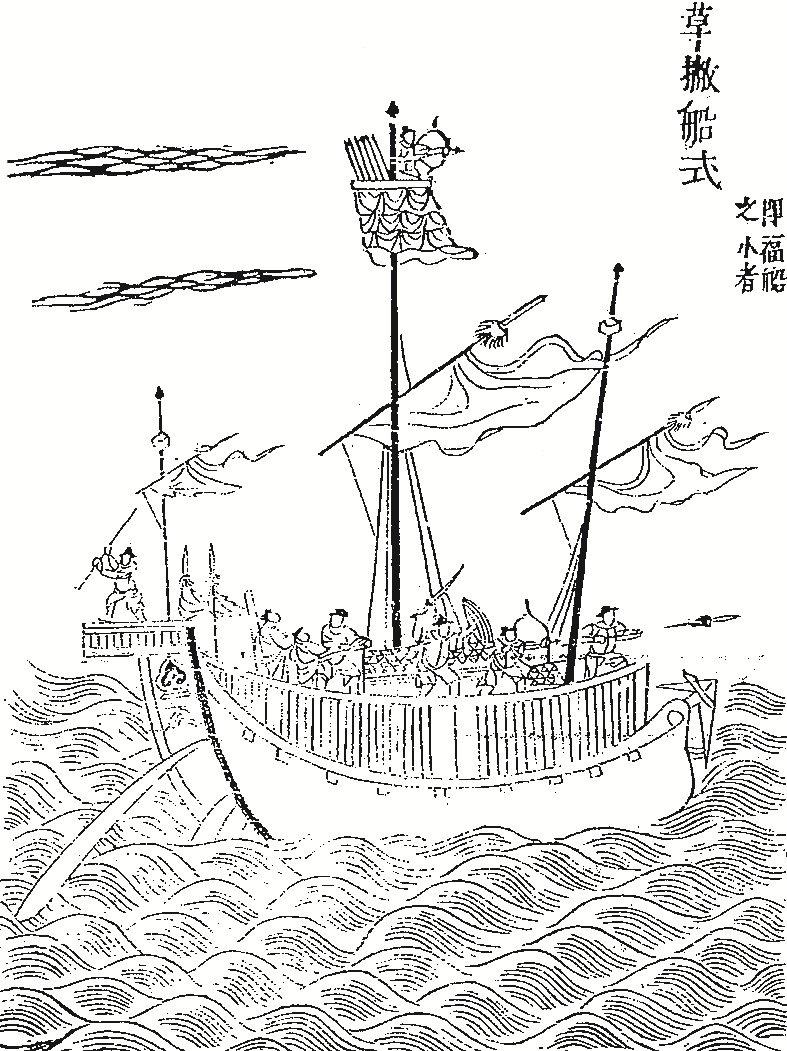
A Ming war junk, illustration from Illustrated book on maritime preparedness (籌海圖編, Chouhai tubian), Zheng Ruozeng, 1562

Xia was involved in foreign relations even before his appointment as minister. In 1523, he had drafted a comprehensive memorandum on relations with Japan. That year, a Japanese delegation arrived in the port city of Ningbo in Zhejiang Province with tribute. However, representatives of the Japanese Ōuchi and Hosokawa clans got into a dispute in the city, resulting in armed clashes and the destruction of the city. The Ming authorities arrested Song Suqing, a Chinese man who had relocated to Japan and was serving as a merchant and envoy for the Hosokawa clan, and several of his associates. The Ouchi leader, Kendō Sōsetsu, plundered and pillaged Hangzhou, the capital of Zhejiang, with a hundred of his men before returning to Japan. The provincial authorities were unable to intervene effectively. In the memorandum, Xia gave an overview of Sino-Japanese relations and demanded punishment for incompetent officials and Japanese intruders. He also proposed impaling the heads of Chinese collaborators with the Japanese, such as Song Suqing, on stakes outside the city gates.

As minister of rites, Xia was known for his moderate approach to foreign relations. He dealt with common issues such as the requests of recently arrived Mongols from Lake Koko Nor to be admitted to dependent chiefdoms, complaints from Tibetans in Minzhou, Gansu about receiving less for their horses compared to neighboring Mongols and Hui, and a request for an increase in the quota of tea that the delegation could purchase. Representatives from numerous states and polities in Inner and Central Asia also sought admission. After the establishment of the Ming dynasty in the 14th century, only three rulers from Central Asian countries were recognized as kings (wang): the rulers of Turpan, Samarkand, and Tianfang (the Kaaba, i.e., Mecca and Red Sea coast of Arabia). At the time, there were 155 rulers claiming to be kings, but their gifts were not sufficient and the ministry's storehouses did not have enough valuables for all of them. As a solution, Xia proposed, and the Emperor approved, rejecting envoys from questionable kings at the borders and instructing the three recognized rulers to establish order among the local chiefs in their regions. In Guangxi Province, the Miao chief of the Pacification Office in Kaili was granted a seven-year remission of tribute (paid in horses) due to the devastation caused by the civil war. The Uriankhai, a group of Mongols residing on the northeastern border, had established close relations with the Ming state since the early 15th century. They held a privileged position in trade relations, as they were allowed to bring tribute and engage in trade every six months, but in 1533, some of them caused trouble by conducting a marauding raid into Ming territory. In 1534, the Ming government granted Korean envoys the privilege of visiting the markets of Beijing once every five days, accompanied by an official interpreter. Previously, like other envoys, they had remained in the Interpreters Institute for the duration of their mission. In 1535, a Ming official successfully traveled to the Ryukyu Kingdom, where he recognized the authority of the local king. In 1536, the Jianzhou Jurchen appeared at the border without the obligatory tribute (horses), but there were almost five hundred of them. Only the usual 80 were allowed to enter China. After the birth of the Emperor's son in November 1536, embassies were sent to neighboring countries with the joyful news. Xia refused to include Đại Việt (present-day northern Vietnam) among them, citing the country's failure to send tribute for twenty years and the fact that the current ruler, Mạc Thái Tông of the Mạc dynasty, was an illegitimate usurper. The minister of war and the militarist faction in the government, led by Guo Xun, Marquis of Wuding, responded by proposing a punitive expedition. This issue sparked a heated debate that lasted until the early 1540s, with the Emperor wavering between recognizing the Mạc dynasty, which ruled most of the country, and invading Đại Việt. While Xia and others supported the invasion, his successor at the Ministry of Rites, Yan Song, advocated for waiting to see the outcome of the civil war in Đại Việt and recognizing the de facto government of the country. From 1538 onwards, troops were being assembled in the southern provinces for the invasion, and the worried Mạc government repeatedly requested that Đại Việt be accepted as a Ming vassal. The Jiajing Emperor ultimately resolved the matter in 1541 by granting the Mạc dynasty's request and recognizing it as a dependent state.

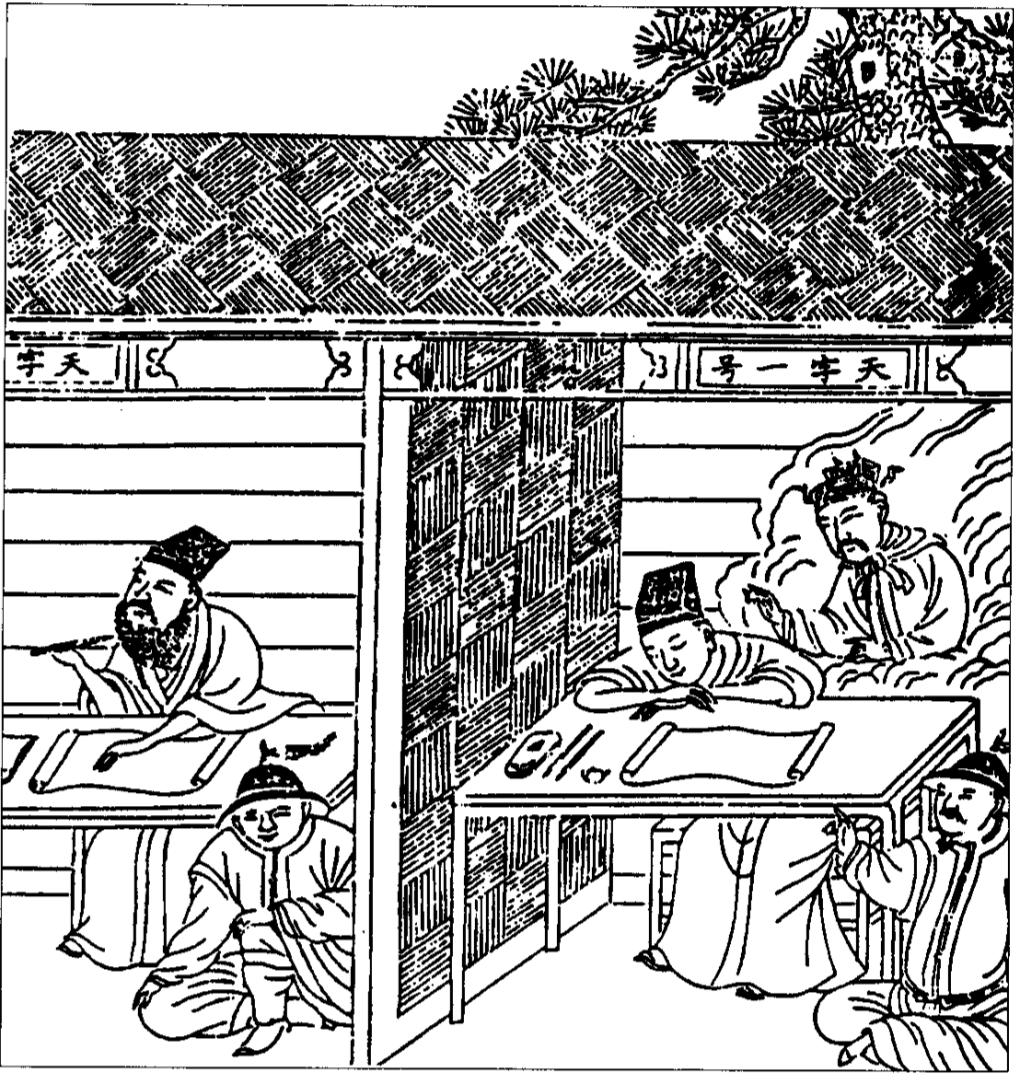
An examinee drunk in the cell, 1605.

The Ministry of Rites was responsible for overseeing the civil service examinations. Xia attempted to influence the examination boards to favor candidates who used direct and clear language, while rejecting essays that were complex and unclear. He also paid attention to collections of essays published by successful candidates, which were meant to serve as instructional materials for students, but he was dissatisfied with the quality of these essays and demanded that they be thoroughly edited before publication to meet the desired exemplary standard. The condition of the state-run Imperial University was problematic. Many students who advanced to the university from prefectural and county schools were too old, of low quality, and generally not useful for the state administration. This was due to the flawed selection system, which favored only a small percentage of students in local schools known as "stipend students" who received state support. These coveted spots were often obtained by students from wealthy families who could afford to purchase them from the current incumbents. Among the stipend students, those who had been waiting the longest were sent to the university according to waiting lists, but they often failed the provincial examinations repeatedly. Xia did not attempt any major reform, but instead implemented a rule that students who were deemed unfit and too old upon arrival at the university would be sent home, but would still retain their status and privileges as students. He also allowed students from distant provinces who had failed the entrance examinations to remain in Beijing until the next examinations. In an effort to raise the prestige of the university, he organized an imperial visit in 1533, which was successful. Additionally, Xia tried to assist students from peripheral regions. For example, Liaodong students were allowed to take their provincial examinations in Beijing to avoid the arduous journey to Shandong (the Liaodong Peninsula belonged to Shandong Province, but after the interruption of sea communication in the late 15th century, students had to bypass the entire Bohai Sea). Similarly, Guizhou students were given their own provincial examinations in Guilin, the provincial capital, instead of having to travel to neighboring Yunnan Province.

The Ministry of Rites was also responsible for matters concerning the imperial family. In early 1534, the Emperor informed Xia of the appointment of a new empress and the promotion of two consorts. The ministry organized a ceremony at the Emperor's ancestors' temple to announce the promotions. They also selected three new imperial concubines to fill vacant positions. This process involved calling on suitable families in selected regions to send girls between the ages of 13–16 with impeccable behavior, speech, and figure to Beijing. From the initial pool of candidates, ten were chosen, and from those, the Emperor's mother selected three to become future concubines. Xia deemed the initial number of one hundred candidates insufficient, and ultimately, 1,258 girls arrived in Beijing. In 1536, Xia also played a role in organizing the Emperor's trip to the tombs of the Ming emperors, overseeing repairs to the tombs, and constructing the tomb for the Jiajing Emperor.

== Grand Secretary ==
In 1535, the Grand Secretariat was reduced in size after Zhang Cong was dismissed and Fei Hong died later that year. This left only the unassuming Li Shi. To fill the vacancy, the Emperor appointed Xia as grand secretary on 23 January 1536.

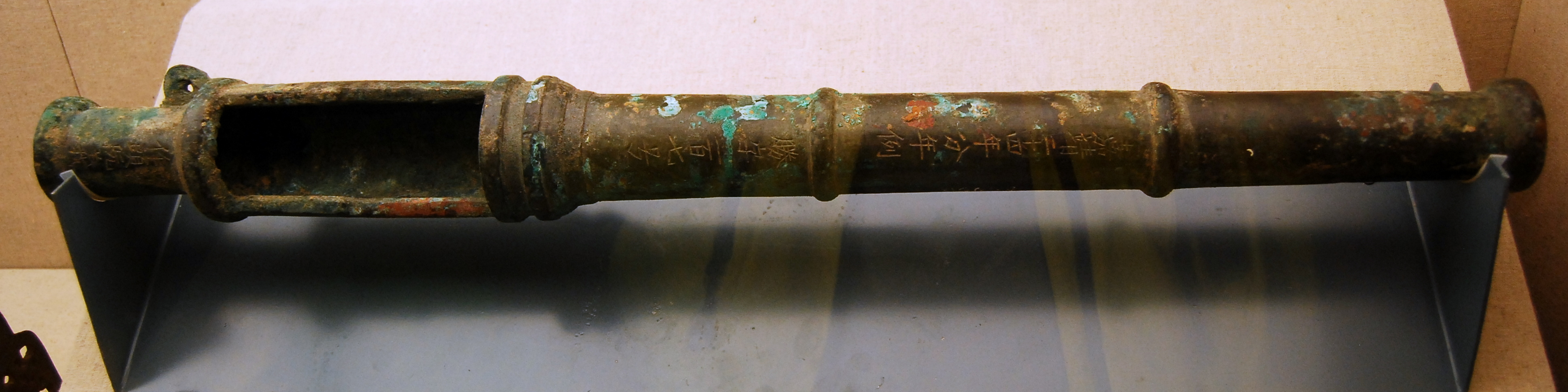
A Ming copper cannon made in 1545, Capital Museum, Beijing.

In terms of foreign policy, Xia took a belligerent stance. In the latter half of the 1530s, he supported military intervention in Đại Việt. His successor at the Ministry of Rites, Yan Song, advocated for a more conciliatory approach. Xia also promoted officials who shared his aggressive attitude to high positions. For example, in 1546, Zeng Xian was appointed as supreme commander of northern Shanxi. He quickly defeated the Mongol invaders and presented a comprehensive plan for further action against them in 1547. This plan included rebuilding defensive walls from Ningxia to Shaanxi and launching annual preemptive attacks on the Mongols in Ordos. Despite opposition from experienced officials such as Weng Wanda, who served as supreme commander of Xuanfu and Datong from 1542 to 1550, Xia supported Zeng Xian's plan. Weng believed the plan was unrealistic. In 1547, Xia also promoted the appointment of Zhu Wan, an experienced official, to the newly created position of "Grand Coordinator of Zhejiang and Concurrent Superintendent of Military Affairs for Zhejiang and Fujian Coastal Defense". Zhu Wan effectively suppressed pirates and smugglers on the southeastern coast, which angered local influential merchant and official families who were profiting from illegal trade. When Xia was removed from office in 1548, Zhu's position also weakened. He was eventually removed from office in 1549 and an investigation into his actions was launched. Zhu committed suicide.

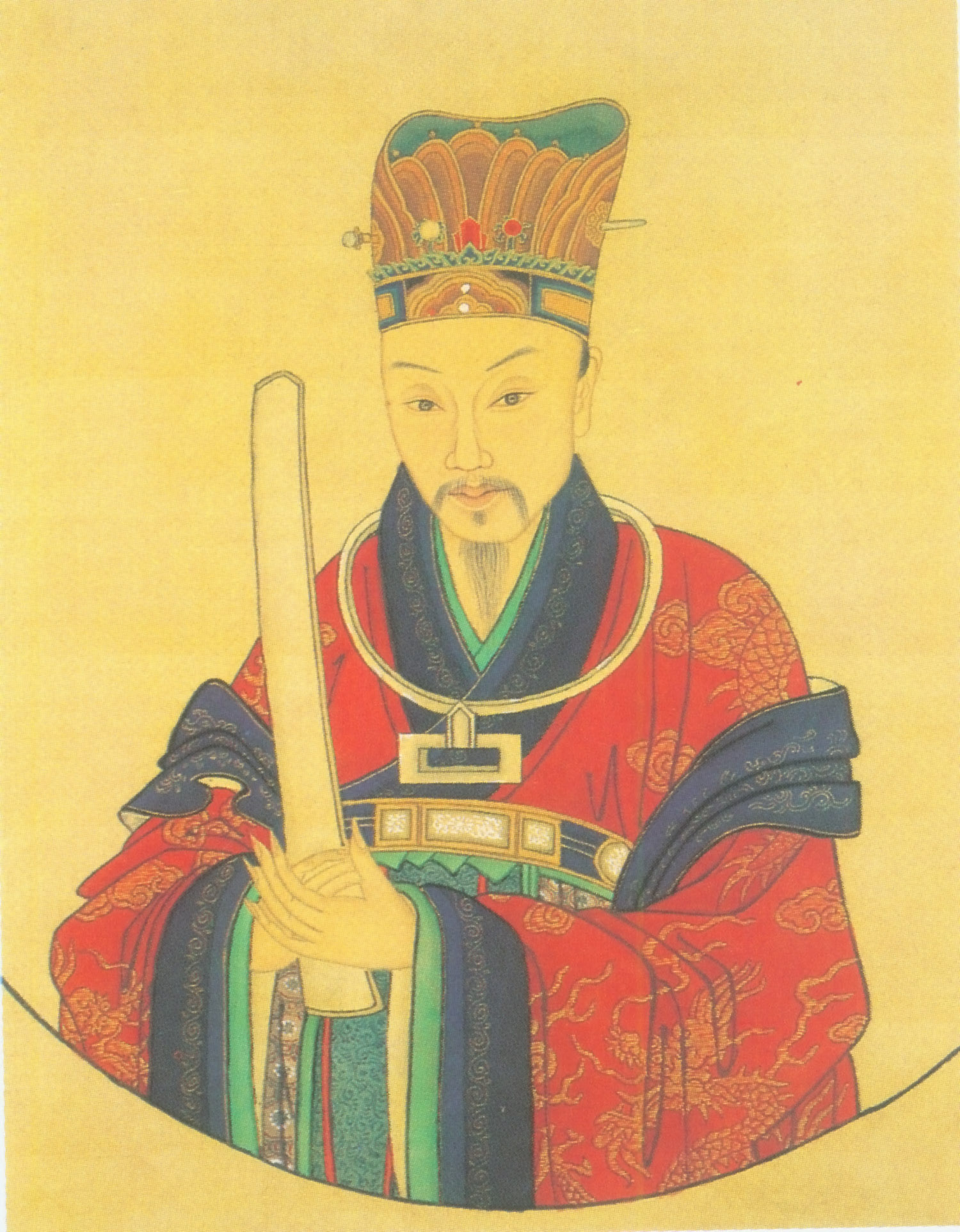
Yan Song, Xia's successor as minister of rites and senior grand secretary.

In May 1539, Xia lost his position for a few days due to his lack of respect for the Emperor and inaccuracies in his work. Despite this, he remained steadfast in his principles. For example, in the 1540s, he refused to wear a Taoist cap to meetings with the Emperor, arguing that it was not part of the official dress. This was seen as a direct challenge to the Emperor's authority. Politically, the years 1539–1541 were relatively uneventful, allowing the Emperor's dignitaries to focus on their own rivalries. During this time, the Emperor's closest advisors were Duke Guo Xun, Duke Zhu Xizhong, Marquis Cui Yuan, Commandant-Escort Wu Jinghe, the grand secretaries Xia Yan and Zhai Luan, and Minister of Rites Yan Song, although Xia Jan and Guo Xun did not get along. As the Emperor had relocated from the Forbidden City to West Park, his advisors also had to move in order to be easily accessible. In September 1541, Xia lost his position again. Despite his request to be relieved of his duties due to ongoing disputes with Guo, the Emperor dismissed him after Xia submitted a carelessly written report full of incorrect characters that angered the Emperor. Following his dismissal, the censors accused Guo of abuse of power and corruption, leading to his arrest in October 1541, but the Emperor remembered Guo's contributions in the Great Rites Controversy and forbade his torture. Guo died in prison in November 1542. In the meantime, the Emperor reinstated Xia as grand secretary on 2 November 1541. Less than a year later, on 11 August 1542, he resigned. China had witnessed a solar eclipse, and Xia said this was a bad omen, but the Emperor suspected him of being involved in the attacks on Guo Xun. Xia also played a role in his own dismissal by not going to his office in the Forbidden City, conducting all affairs from home, and failing to meet the Emperor's demands.

Xia remained out of office until October 1545. During this time, he was replaced by Zhai Luan, who had been dismissed in 1544, and then by Yan Song, who was appointed grand secretary in September 1542. By 1545, Yan Song was the only one left in the Grand Secretariat. In order to counterbalance his influence, the Emperor ordered Xia to return to office on 22 October 1545. Although Yan owed his rise to power to Xia, who had suggested his appointment as minister of rites, the two statesmen were at odds. Xia ignored Yan, did not seek his advice, and canceled his appointments. Feeling threatened, Yan allied himself with Xia's opponents, including the imperial favorites Marquis Cui Yuan, General Lu Bing, and Marquis Qiu Luan. As the Emperor's confidence in Xia declined under their influence, they used the issue of defending the northwest border to push for Xia's dismissal.

In 1547–1548, Xia strongly supported Zeng Xian's aggressive approach towards the Mongols in Ordos and his plans for large-scale campaigns against them. Zeng believed that attacking in the spring, when the nomads' horses were weak after the winter, would lead to success. He requested 60,000 men, including cavalry, artillery, and riverine fleets. Initially, the Emperor showed sympathy towards the plan and requested more detailed elaboration. Qiu Luan, an opponent of the plan and the chief of the regional border command in Gansu subordinate to Zeng, who opposed the plan, was dismissed and arrested at Zeng's request. The Emperor later began to hesitate and had a hundred questionnaires printed, which were received by high-ranking officials to express their opinions on Zeng's plan. Overall, their opinions were cautiously in favor of the plan. The Emperor eventually withdrew his support for the campaign in February 1548, influenced by unfavorable omens, criticism of the plan by Weng Wanda and others, reports of discontent in Shaanxi, and a letter from the imprisoned Qiu accusing Zeng of lying and gaining support in Beijing through huge bribes given to leading dignitaries, especially Xia. The Emperor believed Qiu and released him from prison. Zeng, on the other hand, was removed from office, arrested, and executed in April 1548. Xia's enemies then joined forces against him, accusing him of a series of mistakes and bribery. The Emperor dismissed him from office and had him executed on 31 October 1548. The main reason for the Emperor's reaction, however, was Xia's arrogance. After that, Yan Song became the senior grand secretary.

In 1567, as part of the rehabilitation of officials who had been punished during the Jiajing Emperor's reign, Xia Yan was given the posthumous name Wenmin (文愍).

== Assessment and literary works ==
Xia was known for his energy, competence, and talent as well as his fearlessness and outspokenness. He was one of the few officials who dared to oppose the influential Zhang Cong before the mid-1530s. He was also known for being stubborn and quarrelsome. Despite this, he gained the Emperor's favor and rose to prominence, particularly through his involvement in ceremonial reforms. The Emperor saw him as someone who was not involved in political rivalries and promoted him accordingly. He even bestowed upon Xia the prestigious title of "Supreme Pillar of State" (柱國), an honorific typically reserved for military officers but granted to a civilian official for the first time. However, as time went on, Xia's relationship with the Emperor began to deteriorate. He sometimes spent his evenings with friends and was not always readily available to the Emperor, which his rivals (particularly Duke Guo Xun) used against him in their competition for the Emperor's favor. Additionally, Xia's reluctance to fully participate in Taoist rituals also caused strain in his relationship with the Emperor. While he was willing to write prayers for the Emperor, he had his limits when it came to participating in Taoist ceremonies. Furthermore, his failure to adapt to the Emperor's changing positions and his insistence on his own opinions in political discussions ultimately led to a loss of trust from the Emperor.

Xia Yan's calligraphy was particularly esteemed after his appointment as grand secretary, while his poetry also received considerable praise. His ci poems were published in the collection Guizhou xiansheng ci (桂州先生詞; 9 juan (chapters)), while his other poetry was compiled in Guizhou shiji (桂州詩集; 24 juan). His memorials were collected in Nangong zougao (南宮奏稿; 5 juan), which was later expanded into Guizhou zouyi (桂州奏議; 21 juan). Another collection, Zouxie lu (奏謝錄), comprised three juan. Xia's collected works were published under the title Guizhou xiansheng wenji (桂州先生文集; 50 juan).

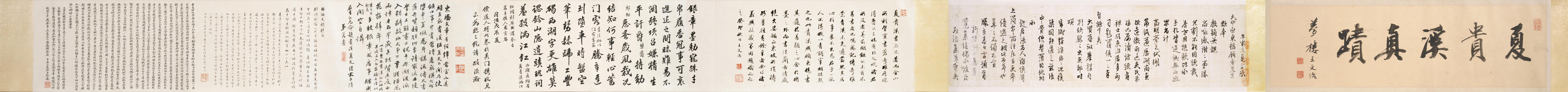
Xia Yan's letter to Gu Lin, written in the running script style
