= Filial mourning =

Imperial China bureaucratic practice

Filial mourning (simplified Chinese: 丁忧; traditional Chinese: 丁憂; pinyin: dīngyōu) refers to a bureaucratic norm, practiced since the Han dynasty, whereby officials of the imperial government of China were obliged to resign their posts and return to their home upon the death of a parent or grandparent.

== Description ==
The meaning of the phrase literally means 'to encounter worries/loss', i.e. bereavement. Once used to refer to all forms of mourning for one's parents, it evolved in meaning to refer only to the practice of officials resigning their posts for mourning.

The roots of the practice lie in the Confucianist focus on filial piety as a key virtue of government, and thus was instituted during the Western Han dynasty, when Confucianism first became the official ideology of the empire. During the mourning period, banqueting, marriage, official activities and participation in the imperial examinations are all proscribed. The length of the mourning period is nominally three years, though in practice it has been described as being between twenty-five and twenty-seven months; this is also in line with Confucian prescriptions, since it takes three years for a human child to be fully weaned. At the end of the period, officials will be returned to the same rank as their last previously served post.

Nonetheless, given the length of the mandatory mourning and the tight restrictions on political or public activity, this practice often had a negative effect on the career of officials. Measures did exist to allow the government to recall an official in mourning; this is often applied to key officials in the bureaucracy, who are unable to leave their duties immediately as prescribed, or in times of emergency. On the other hand, failure to report a deceased parent and submit to filial mourning was an offence, and officials were liable to be impeached upon discovery.

Even the emperor was subjected to filial mourning, though his indispensability to administrative duties means he need only mourn for 27 days, instead of months.

== Republic of Korea ==
The custom of the three-year mourning period was introduced to Korea during the early Goryeo period, and continued only intermittently as many complained it was too long. It spread around the country during the late Goryeo period after the great Neo-Confucian scholar-official Chŏng Mong-ju (1337–1392) spent the entire three-year mourning period living in a shack beside his parents' graves. It became the norm among the Neo-Confucian literati class during the following Joseon period.

Hence, when a parent died, people were expected to build a shack beside their parent's grave and stay there till the three-year period was over. Over the three years, they abstained from meat and liquor and did not sleep with their wives.

Among more traditional Korean families a modified form of filial mourning is still practiced. One who has lost a parent is supposed to keep a low profile for three years, avoiding "pleasures".
