= Zeng Xian =

- 曾銑

Supreme Commander of the Shaanxi Three Borders Defense Areas
- In office 8 May 1546 – 1548
- Monarch: Jiajing Emperor

Grand Coordinator of Shanxi
- In office February 1544 – May 1546
- Preceded by: Li Yu
- Succeeded by: Yang Shouqian

Grand Coordinator of Shandong
- In office 1541 – February 1544

Regional Inspector of Liaodong
- In office January 1534 – 1535

Magistrate of Changle
- In office 1529–1533

Personal details
- Born: 1499
- Died: April 25, 1548 (aged 48–49)
- Occupation: Official, censor, general
- Courtesy name: Zizhong (Note: Chinese: 子重; pinyin: Zǐzhòng)
- Art name: Shitang (Note: Chinese: 石塘; pinyin: Shítáng)
- Posthumous name: Xiangmin (Note: Chinese: 襄愍; pinyin: Xiāngmǐn)

Chinese name
- Traditional Chinese: 曾銑
- Simplified Chinese: 曾铣
Transcriptions
Standard Mandarin
- Hanyu Pinyin: Zēng Xiǎn

Zeng Xian (1499–1548) was a military official of the Ming dynasty of China. Serving in various high military positions in the northern provinces, he was tasked with the defence of the frontier against the Mongols. He was most famous for his proposal to retake the Ordos Loop for the Ming and extend the Great Wall of China over the region, which was met with initial enthusiasm from the Jiajing Emperor; however, opponents of the proposal brought upon a quick reversal which resulted in the downfall and execution of Zeng and his principal supporter, Senior Grand Secretary Xia Yan.

== Early life and career ==
Zeng Xian was born into a military family in Jiangdu of Hangzhou, Jiangsu province in 1499. By the age of 30, he had passed the imperial examinations twice, first as a juren and later as a jinshi. His first official assignment was as magistrate of the town of Changle in Fujian province, after which he was posted to Liaodong as a censor and regional inspector in January 1534. During his duty here, a mutiny broke out in Liaoyang in April 1535, and Zeng's rapid action in putting down the mutiny and executing the ringleaders earned him recognition as a military expert. He was promoted as the director of the Grand Court of Revision (大理寺丞) later in the year, and moved up to the posts of left assistant censor-in-chief (右僉都御史) and grand coordinator of Shandong in 1541.

China of the 1540s was under the threat of Altan Khan's raids across the northern frontier. As grand coordinator of Shandong, Zeng initiated defence works around the city of Linqing on the Grand Canal. The resulting wall was seven miles long, crossing two rivers, and had nine gates including three water gates, along with numerous towers along its length. It became such a spectacle that the wall and the city became popularly known as the Jade Girdle City (玉帶城) at the time. After this, he was made vice-censor-in-chief (右副都御史) in September 1543 and later grand coordinator of Shanxi, being posted on various passes of the Great Wall of China in that province. The Veritable Records of the Ming notes that as a result of Zeng's long service on the border and his outstanding achievements, the nomads had not attacked Xuanfu, Datong, or Shanxi. In 1546, Zeng became the vice minister of war and the Supreme Commander of the Shaanxi Three Borders Defense Areas, namely Yulin, Ningxia, and Guyuan.

== Proposal to retake the Ordos ==
Zeng started his new role with marked energy. Barely a month after he became supreme commander, he had the "Embroidered-uniform Guard" arrest four of his subordinates for incompetence and demoted three others, then took control of their troops and resources. It was around this time that Altan Khan invaded Shaanxi via Yan'an and Qingyang. Zeng responded by sending a separate force to attack the rear of the Mongols by a circuitous route, which resulted in a slaughter of the Mongol women, children, and the elderly who travelled with the invading army at Mount Maliang (馬梁山). This compelled the invaders to retreat.

After the invasion, Zeng led counter-attacks and strengthened local defences, but soon felt that a permanent solution was needed to deal with the nomadic raids along the border. To that end, he identified the Ordos Loop—a stretch of land that is technically part of the steppe, but south of the Yellow River and capable of irrigated agriculture—as a corridor that the Chinese must retake. On 8 January 1547, he memorialized the throne with a detailed proposal of a military campaign into the Ordos Loop and fortification of the land after chasing the nomads out from there. The militarily-minded Jiajing Emperor initially liked the idea, and ordered the treasury to allocate the funds needed for the endeavour. The Senior Grand Secretary Xia Yan, effectively the head of government under the emperor, placed his confidence and support behind Zeng's proposal such that he might secure his position in the imperial court and associate his name with "an accomplishment of the kind that is seen only rarely in history" (普世之功). However, legitimate concerns about the costs of the operation were raised, and personal political rivals of Zeng and Xia banded together to use these opposing views to plot their downfall. Yan Song, a rival grand secretary, arranged to have rumours spread in the capital that Zeng had been misappropriating funds to bribe influential officials to support his proposal.

On 15 February 1548, the Jiajing Emperor suddenly voiced his misgivings about Zeng's proposal and his character. Xia was shocked at the reversal and immediately dropped his sponsorship of the project in order to limit his association with Zeng. The Emperor called for an re-examination of the whole issue, during which he dismissed Zeng's integrity and called the proposal ill-considered. The campaign was cancelled, and Zeng was arrested. Because of the scandal, Zeng's name became so toxic that Xia was compelled to ask for retirement. For a time, the Emperor allowed Xia to retire without reducing his ranks, but Xia's enemies harped on connections of Zeng's crimes to Xia. As a result of these charges, Zeng was executed on 25 April 1548, and Xia too was beheaded on 31 October 1548. Yan became the head of the grand secretariat and controlled the imperial court for more than a decade since.

The people of the time considered the punishment to be too harsh for the perceived crime, and in 1567, early in the reign of the Longqing Emperor, a motion was filed to review Zeng's case. Thereupon the imperial court granted Zeng the posthumous name of Xiangmin (襄愍) and the rank of minister of war.
