= Shang Lu =

Chinese official (1414–1486)

- 商輅
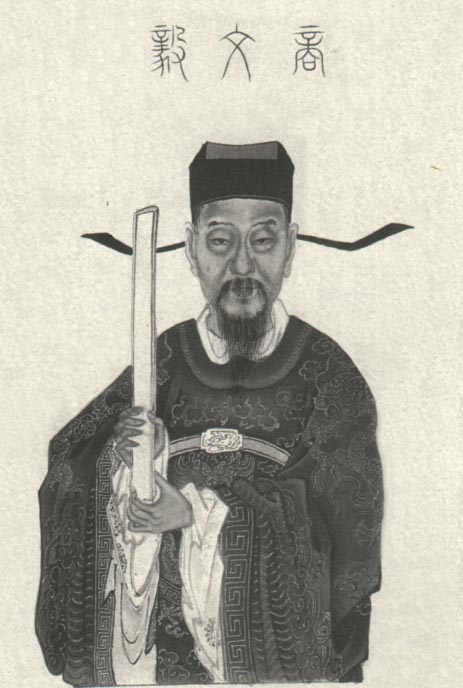

Senior Grand Secretary
- In office 1475–1477
- Monarch: Chenghua
- Preceded by: Peng Shi
- Succeeded by: Wan An

Grand Secretary
- In office 1449–1457
- Monarch: Jingtai
- In office 1467–1477
- Monarch: Chenghua

Personal details
- Born: 16 March 1414 Chun'an, Zhejiang
- Died: 17 August 1486 (aged 72) Chun'an, Zhejiang
- Education: jinshi degree (1445)

Chinese name
- Traditional Chinese: 商輅
- Simplified Chinese: 商辂
Transcriptions
Standard Mandarin
- Hanyu Pinyin: Shāng Lù

Shang Lu (Note: Shang Lu used the courtesy name Hongzai (弘載) and the art name Su'an (素庵).) (16 March 1414 – 17 August 1486) was a Chinese scholar-official during the Ming dynasty. In the autumn of 1449, the Jingtai Emperor appointed him as grand secretary, but he was later retired by Emperor Yingzong in 1457. After a decade, the Chenghua Emperor called him back to the Grand Secretariat, where he served as the senior grand secretary from 1475. A disagreement with the eunuch Wang Zhi led to his retirement from government service in 1477.

== Biography ==
Shang Lu was born on 16 March 1414 during China's Ming dynasty, in Chun'an County, near Hangzhou, Zhejiang Province. He excelled in his studies of Confucianism and achieved top scores in the provincial (1435), metropolitan, and palace (both 1445) civil service examinations, becoming the only scholar to attain this distinction during the three centuries of the Ming dynasty. (Note: Shang Lu was fiercely protective of his status as the most successful examination candidate. During the palace examination of 1477, two other candidates, Wang Ao and Liu Jian, had the opportunity to achieve the same distinction of winning first place in all three examinations. Shang, however, who presided over the examination board, influenced their evaluations (as the examinations at this stage were not anonymous).) After passing the examinations, he was appointed to the Hanlin Academy.

In September 1449, Emperor Yingzong was captured by the Mongols, and his younger brother Zhu Qiyu ascended the throne as the Jingtai Emperor. The new emperor then appointed Shang and Peng Shi (the top scorer in the palace examination of 1448) as new grand secretaries. Shang served in this position throughout the Jingtai Emperor's reign. In early 1457, after Emperor Yingzong was restored to the throne in a coup, one of the leaders of the new regime, Shi Heng, permitted the revocation of all decrees made by the previous emperor in the past year. Shang resolutely refused to comply, and he was sentenced to death for allegedly being an ally of Yu Qian, a powerful minister in the Jingtai Emperor's regime. Emperor Yingzong later overturned the sentence and permitted Shang to return to his hometown as an ordinary citizen.

Ten years later, in 1467, Emperor Yingzong's son and successor, the Chenghua Emperor, once again called him to serve as grand secretary. After the death of his colleague Peng Shi in 1475, he was promoted to the position of senior grand secretary. His tenure in this role was short-lived, lasting only two years. In 1477, he joined forces with Minister of War Xiang Zhong to confront Wang Zhi, the eunuch in charge of the secret police department known as the Western Depot. Wang was accused of abusing his power and unjustly arresting and torturing innocent people. Despite Shang's efforts, the Emperor sided with Wang and dismissed his critics, including Shang himself.

Shang was highly respected for his knowledge, simplicity of life, tolerance, and decisiveness. His courage and determination were particularly admired, even though they ultimately led to his dismissal from his position twice.

He died on 17 August 1486, and was given the posthumous name Wenyi, meaning "Cultivated and Resolute", in recognition of his contributions.
