= Peng Shi (mandarin) =

Chinese official (1416–1475)

- 彭時
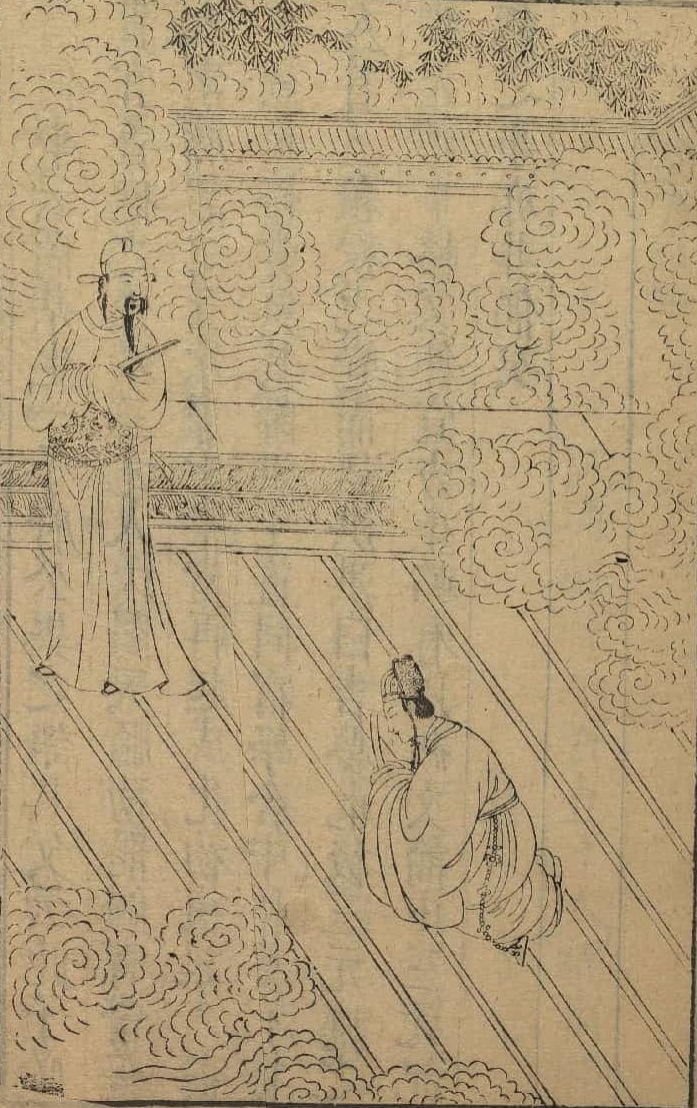

Senior Grand Secretary
- In office 1468–1475
- Monarch: Chenghua
- Preceded by: Chen Wen
- Succeeded by: Shang Lu

Grand Secretary
- In office 1449–1450
- Monarch: Jingtai
- In office 1457–1475
- Monarchs: Yingzong; Chenghua

Personal details
- Born: 1416 Anfu, Jiangxi
- Died: 27 March 1475 (aged 58–59)
- Education: jinshi degree (1448)

Chinese name
- Traditional Chinese: 文憲
- Simplified Chinese: 文宪
Transcriptions
Standard Mandarin
- Hanyu Pinyin: Wénxiàn

Peng Shi (Note: Peng Shi's courtesy name was Chundao (純道).) (1416 – 27 April 1475) was a Chinese scholar-official during the Ming dynasty. In the autumn of 1449, the Jingtai Emperor appointed him as grand secretary, but he was later transferred to the Hanlin Academy in the following year. It was not until 1457, after the coup that restored Emperor Yingzong to the throne, that Peng returned to the Grand Secretariat. He held the position of grand secretary until his death and was promoted to senior grand secretary in 1468, serving under Emperor Yingzong's son, the Chenghua Emperor.

== Biography ==
Peng Shi was born in 1416 during China's Ming dynasty in Anfu County, Ji'an, in southern Jiangxi Province. He excelled in the civil service examinations, passed the palace examination, and obtained the jinshi degree in 1448 as the top candidate.

In the autumn of 1449, during the Tumu Crisis, in which Emperor Yingzong was captured by the Mongols, he was summoned to the Grand Secretariat and took part in the accession of the Jingtai Emperor. He soon angered the new emperor when he requested a leave of absence to mourn his mother's death. He was dismissed in early 1450 and thereafter held lower positions at the Hanlin Academy until the end of the Jingtai era. In early 1457, Emperor Yingzong was restored to power in a coup, and Peng was appointed grand secretary once again in the summer of that year.

As the grand secretary, Peng was known for his respect and recognition of Li Xian, the senior grand secretary from 1457 to 1467. Despite his personal dislike for Li, the two formed a strong partnership as statesmen. (Note: It was one of the manifestations of the north–south rivalry.) On the other hand, Peng was a close friend of Grand Secretary Shang Lu.

In 1464, Emperor Yingzong died and was succeeded by his son the Chenghua Emperor. Peng was then given the formal position of vice minister of personnel in addition to his role as grand secretary. The following year, he was formally promoted to minister of war. In 1467, he became the tutor to the heir to the throne. After the death of Chen Wen in 1468, Peng was promoted to the position of senior grand secretary, which he held until his death. He died on 27 April 1475, and was granted the posthumous name Wenxian (文憲).
