= Yan Song =

Chinese official (1480–1565)

- 嚴嵩
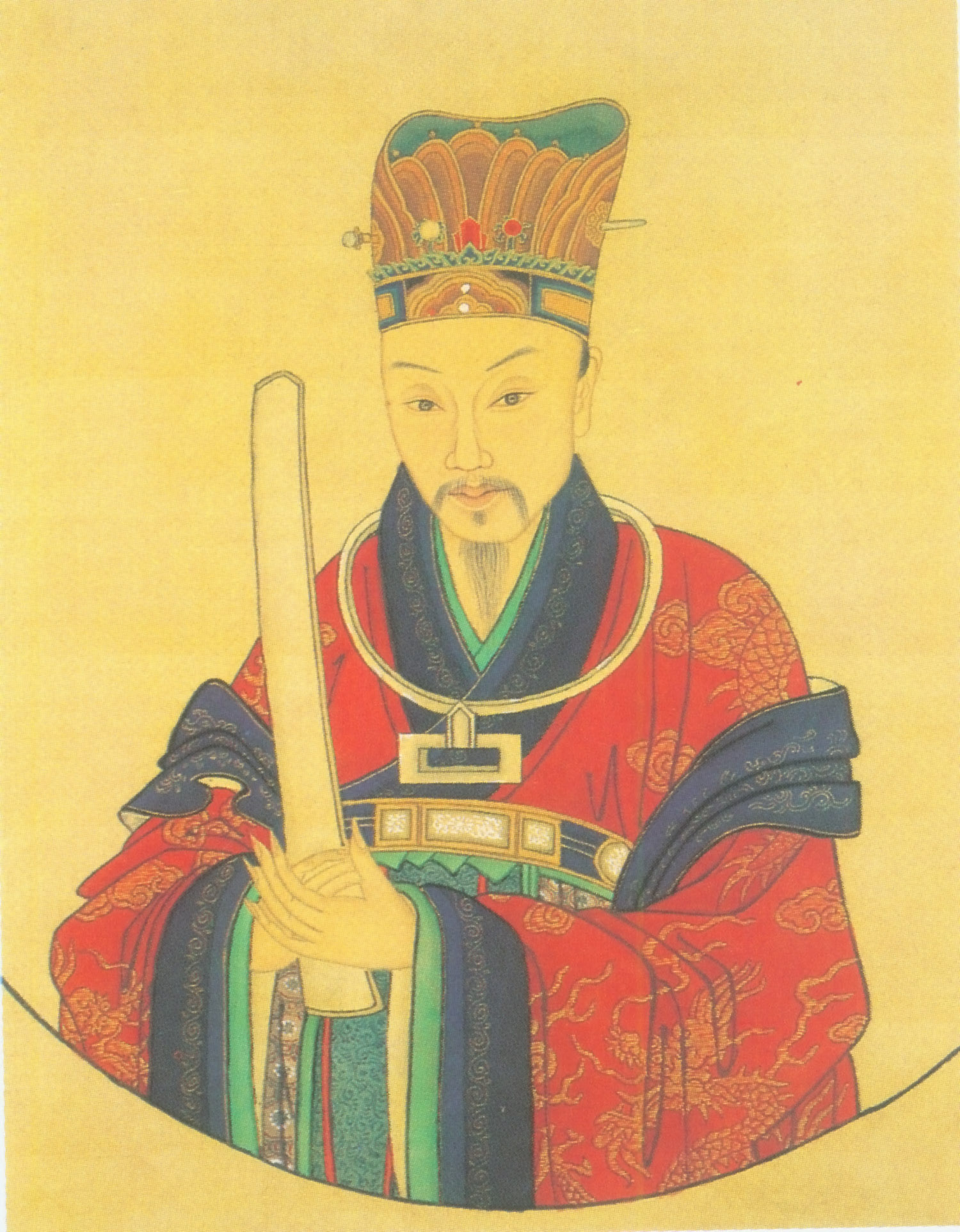

Senior Grand Secretary
- In office 1544–1545
- Monarch: Jiajing
- Preceded by: Zhai Luan
- Succeeded by: Xia Yan
- In office 1548–1562
- Monarch: Jiajing
- Preceded by: Xia Yan
- Succeeded by: Xu Jie

Grand Secretary
- In office 1542–1562
- Monarch: Jiajing

Minister of Rites
- In office 1536–1543
- Monarch: Jiajing
- Preceded by: Xia Yan
- Succeeded by: Zhang Bi

Personal details
- Born: 3 March 1480 Fenyi County, Jiangxi
- Died: 1565 (aged 84–85)
- Spouse: Lady Ouyang
- Children: 2
- Education: jinshi degree (1505)

Chinese name
- Traditional Chinese: 嚴嵩
- Simplified Chinese: 严嵩
Transcriptions
Standard Mandarin
- Hanyu Pinyin: Yán Sōng

Yan Song (Note: Yan Song used the courtesy name Weizhong (惟中) and the art names Jiexi (介溪) and Mian'an (勉庵).) (3 March 1480 – 1565) was a Chinese scholar-official during the Ming dynasty. He held various high-ranking positions during the reign of the Jiajing Emperor in the mid-16th century, including minister of rites (1536–1543), grand secretary (1542–1562), and head of the Grand Secretariat (1544–1545, 1548–1562). His service as grand secretary was the longest in three centuries of Ming rule.

Yan came from a merchant family in Jiangxi Province with ancestral roots in Shaowu. His father was a teacher and principal at a local school. After passing the civil service examinations, he excelled in the final round, the palace examination, in 1505, ranking fifth among all candidates. As a distinguished graduate of the examinations, he was appointed to the Hanlin Academy, where he eventually rose to the position of Hanlin academician and head of the academy in Nanjing. From 1525 to 1528, he served as the chancellor of the Imperial University, and later held the positions of vice minister of rites (1528–1531) in Beijing and minister of rites (1531–1536) in Nanjing. In 1536, he returned to Beijing to assume the high-ranking roles of minister of rites and grand secretary. In his role as minister of rites, he oversaw important tasks such as rituals and ceremonies, foreign relations, state Confucian schools, civil service examinations, and the affairs of the imperial family. As a minister and one of the grand secretaries, he was one of the closest advisors to the Emperor, and in the 1550s, he was the Emperor's most trusted confidant. As a statesman, he was diligent and responsible, while also maintaining a polite and modest demeanor. In his political dealings, he often sought compromise solutions.

As a prominent statesman, Yan was frequently sought after for support and often delegated the task of dealing with applicants to his son, Yan Shifan. Their political rivals repeatedly accused Yan Shifan of engaging in corrupt practices and using bribery to influence politics. Despite defending himself against these accusations for a considerable amount of time, Yan Song was ultimately removed from his position in 1562 due to his advanced age, and his son was also exiled. In 1564–1565, Yan Shifan was accused of plotting a rebellion and was subsequently executed. The authorities seized the family's immense wealth, accumulated during Yan Song's time in high office, leaving Yan Song to live out his final days in poverty and isolation.

== Youth and early career ==
Yan Song was born on 3 March 1480 during China's Ming dynasty in Fenyi, Jiangxi Province. Although his family was registered as artisans, they were actually engaged in trade. Later, when Yan became wealthy, he joined the wholesale trade with his son. Together, they owned several shops in Yangzhou, the leading commercial center in the southern part of the country. Yan Song's father, Yan Huai (嚴淮; 1453–1495), was primarily a teacher and principal of a local school. Despite being a weak and often sickly child, Yan Song showed great literary talent. His father spared no effort in educating him in Confucian teachings. In 1495, at the age of 15, Yan Song applied for the provincial civil service examination, but his father had just died, and he could not take the exam because of mourning. He eventually passed the provincial examination in 1498, ranking sixteenth, which was a decent performance. It was not until 1505 that he succeeded in the metropolitan examination as number 38. He ranked fifth in the palace examination that followed, which was a great success, although he had hoped for an even better result.

Biographer Wang Shizhen states that during the examination and final banquet in 1498, Yan Song left a negative impression on the examiner due to his gaunt appearance and poorly dressed attire. This negative perception continued to haunt him for years. He often reminisced about the challenging times of his youth, particularly after his mother's death in 1509, when he lacked the means to give her a dignified funeral. In 1499, he married Lady Ouyang, and their daughter was born the same year. In 1513, their son Yan Shifan (嚴世蕃) was born.

In 1505, Yan was appointed as a bachelor (Shujishi) at the Hanlin Academy. Around 1508, he requested a leave of absence due to illness and returned to his hometown of Fenyi. He spent eight years there, avoiding the factional conflicts and purges that occurred during the eunuch Liu Jin's dominance (1506–1510) at the imperial court. It was not until 1516 that Yan fully recovered and even then, he rarely returned to work. Upon his return to Beijing, he was reassigned to the Hanlin Academy as a junior compiler. In addition to his duties at the academy, he was given various short-term assignments, such as training imperial eunuchs in 1517, serving on the examination board for the metropolitan and palace examinations, and being part of a delegation sent to Guangxi Province in 1518 to oversee the accession of a new Ming prince. He refrained from participating in protests against the emperors, including those against the Zhengde Emperor's trips to the northern borderlands and south in 1517–1519, as well as discussions about the order of accession for the new Jiajing Emperor in 1521 and the Great Rites Controversy in 1524. As a politician, he avoided getting involved in factional disputes and did not hold strong opinions on political matters. This made him open to supporting any applicants who offered suitable gifts when he rose to higher positions.

Yan was later transferred to the Hanlin Academy in Nanjing and in 1525, he returned to Beijing to take over the administration of the state-run Imperial University. After three years, he was appointed vice minister of rites and given the honorable task of traveling to the tomb of the Emperor's father in Anlu, Huguang Province, to announce his new temple name to his spirit.

== Minister of Rites ==
From 1531 to 1536, Yan served as the minister of rites in Nanjing. In 1536, he was promoted to minister of rites in Beijing, where he served alongside Xia Yan. Xia was appointed grand secretary that same year. Following Xia's departure from the position, Yan Song became the sole minister of rites in January 1537. Yan held this position until May 1543, when he was appointed grand secretary. The Ministry of Rites was responsible for various duties, including overseeing rituals and ceremonies, managing foreign relations, overseeing state Confucian schools and civil service examinations, and handling matters related to members of the imperial family living in different regions.

During the 1530s, as he rose in office, Yan's financial situation significantly improved. Between 1537 and 1539, he had a new residence built in Beijing, immediately south of the Forbidden City. His son, Yan Shifan, oversaw the construction and subsequently managed the household. In 1540, Yan Shifan also oversaw the construction of a new extensive family residence in his native region, Yuanzhou Prefecture, which was located 40 kilometers away from his hometown of Fenyi. As Yan Song's power and influence grew, he gradually handed over the responsibility of accepting applicants for help and various benefits in exchange for a reasonable "gift" to his son. This allowed Yan Song to keep his hands clean and focus on fulfilling the wishes of the ruler as a reliable, efficient, and always loyal minister.

As the minister of rites, Yan played a crucial role in the ceremonial reforms of the late 1530s. This included the change of the temple name of the Yongle Emperor (r. 1402–1424), the third emperor of the dynasty. In 1536, Yan was instrumental in persuading the Jiajing Emperor to officially declare his newborn son, Zhu Zairui, as the heir. The Emperor named his son as his heir in 1539. Later that year, the Emperor's mother died. After discussions between the Emperor and the government, it was decided that she would be buried in Anlu, in the tomb of her husband. The Emperor personally inspected his father's tomb and Yan played a significant role in organizing the journey. The journey was accompanied by over a thousand officials and servants, as well as six thousand soldiers. It took place in March–May 1539. In June of the same year, a funeral procession with the remains of the Emperor's mother set off for Anlu.

=== Foreign policy ===
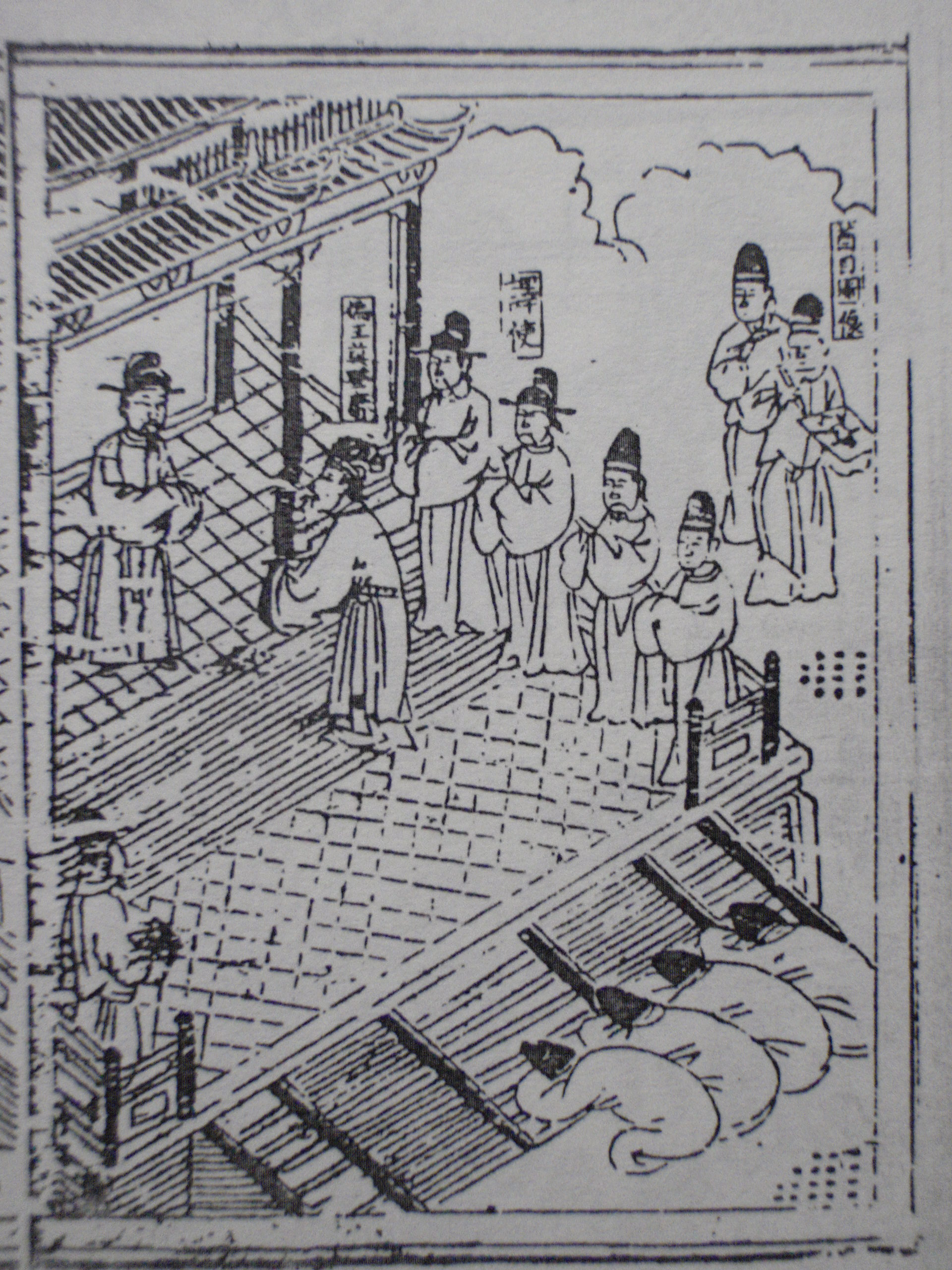
The Viet ruler Mạc Thái Tổ (center) presents tribute to the Ming envoy in 1541. Illustration from the Annan laiwei tuce (安南來威圖冊; 'Graphic Account of the Overawing of Annam') published during the Longqing era (1568–1572).

The major foreign policy concern during the late 1530s and early 1540s was the situation in Đại Việt (present-day in northern Vietnam). After the Emperor's son was born in November 1536, the Ming government sent envoys to neighboring countries to announce the prince's birth. Grand Secretary Xia Yan refused to include Đại Việt in these diplomatic efforts. He argued that Đại Việt had not paid tribute for twenty years and that the current ruler, Mạc Thái Tông, was not a legitimate leader. The Minister of War and the militarist faction in the government, led by Guo Xun, Marquis of Wuting, responded by proposing a punitive expedition. This proposal was met with criticism for being extravagant and costly. In March 1537, envoys from Mạc Thái Tông's rival Lê Trang Tông arrived in Beijing, seeking assistance against Mạc. The Jiajing Emperor then tasked the Ministries of Rites and War with investigating the situation. Yan presented the Emperor with a summary of the history of Sino-Viet relations over the past fifteen centuries and the conclusions of consultations between high-ranking officials. They agreed that Mạc Thái Tông was responsible for the civil war, the closure of the border, and the interruption of mutual relations. They recommended military action against him, and the Jiajing Emperor agreed. However, local authorities in Guangdong protested against the invasion of Đại Việt. They argued that the Viets were not violating the border and that the outcome of their civil war was unclear. These protests from regional officials caused the Emperor to hesitate, and in June, he canceled military preparations. In September 1537, influenced by new proposals from the regions, he resumed preparations for war.

In the spring of 1538, the Jiajing Emperor appointed a commander for the campaign, but the border authorities responded by quantifying the expected costs and problems of the war. The Ministry of War responded to the Emperor's inquiry by submitting the matter to inter-ministerial consultations, and the Ministry of Rites found that Mạc Thái Tông controlled three-quarters of the country, while Lê Trang Tông had only minimal influence. Additionally, the powerful Trịnh and Nguyễn families dominated the opposition to the Mạc dynasty. Mạc Thái Tông also humbly requested the Ming government to establish relations, claiming that Lê Trang Tông was an impostor with no legitimate claim to the throne. With both sides of the Viets willing to acknowledge Ming supremacy, Yan recommended waiting, and the Emperor ultimately decided to call off the invasion. Discussions on the Đại Việt problem continued into 1539–1540. In 1539, a delegation from Mạc Thái Tông requested to establish relations with the Ming authorities. They submitted censuses and maps of the country as evidence of Mạc Thái Tông's rule over Đại Việt. In late 1540, the gathering of 110,000 Ming soldiers in Guangxi Province alarmed Mạc Thái Tông. In an attempt to avert an invasion, he personally knelt on the Ming-Viet border and presented Ming officials with a new request for recognition. This request was accompanied by documentation of his government, civil and military offices, and a willingness to hand over disputed border territories to the Ming dynasty. Finally, in April 1541, the Jiajing Emperor decided in favor of the Mạc dynasty (then ruled by Mạc Thái Tổ). (Note: Mạc Thái Tông died in January 1541, and his father, Retired Emperor Mạc Thái Tổ (r. 1527–1530), briefly returned to power as regent before passing the throne to Mạc Thái Tông's son, Mạc Hiến Tông.) He pardoned Mạc Thái Tổ for crimes committed during the civil wars, declared the previous Lê dynasty extinct, and recognized him as the ruler of Đại Việt. However, he did not grant him the title of king (wang), which the Ming dynasty had granted to the rulers of the Lê dynasty. Instead, he gave him the title of "pacification commissioner". The Emperor also honored and presented gifts to the grand secretaries Xia Yan and Zhai Luan for organizing war preparations, and to Yan Song and Guo Xun for their constructive proposals. This chosen solution, not insisting on the general principle of foreign policy–the Ming dynasty would support legitimate rulers if they recognized Ming superiority–and instead respecting the power reality in Đại Việt, was characteristic of Yan Song's concept of politics.

The Ming court severed official trade relations with Japan following the violence caused by the Japanese in Ningbo in 1523. Despite this, Japan had a high demand for Chinese goods, particularly silk. In the 1530s, new silver deposits were discovered and Chinese mining techniques were introduced, giving Japan the financial means to afford larger imports from China. In 1539, three Japanese ships arrived in Zhejiang with tribute and a request for trade. The envoys, led by Buddhist monk Koshin Sekitei, were received by the Emperor in Beijing; however, the fifty-member delegation was closely monitored and not permitted to engage in trade. The following year, Japanese ships arrived again, and the Emperor referred their requests to inter-ministerial consultations led by Yan. After deliberation, the ministries and Censorate concluded that the ships should be turned away and that future Japanese visits should adhere to the rules established by the Hongwu Emperor in the 14th century: one visit every ten years with only three unarmed ships. In the event of any issues, contact should be terminated. They also urged for the reinforcement of coastal defenses, which were in poor condition, as a precautionary measure. The Emperor concurred with his officials. However, another delegation in 1544 was also rejected, and from 1545 onwards, the Japanese disregarded the Ming authorities and engaged in annual trade with Chinese merchants on Shuangyu Island off the coast of Zhejiang. Yan accused the merchants and government of the Ryukyu Islands of participating in illegal trade and demanded that the ruler of the island rectify the situation.

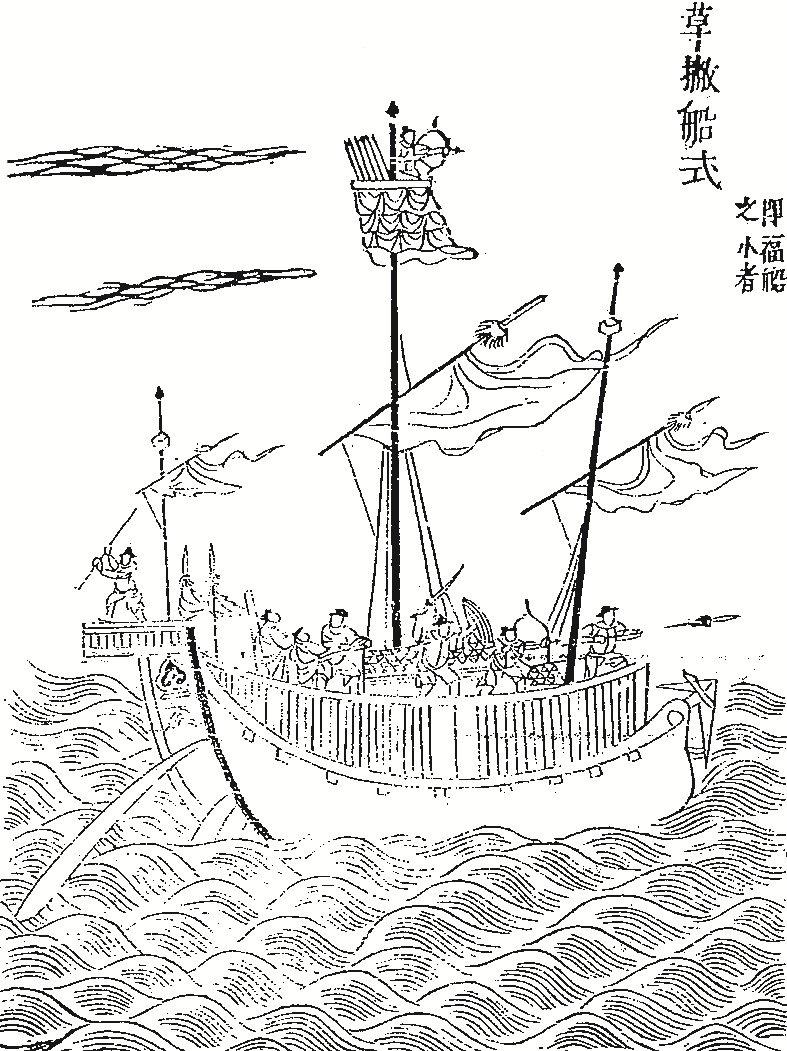
A Ming war junk, illustration from Illustrated book on maritime preparedness (籌海圖編, Chouhai tubian), Zheng Ruozeng, 1562

The Tibetans, Jurchens, and Koreans behaved calmly. The Mongols, specifically the Uriankhai in eastern Mongolia, submitted to the Ming rules of foreign relations. When their request for expanded trade was rejected, they apologized. They also asked for an extraordinary subsidy to compensate for the damage to their economy caused by adverse weather and the raid of the "yellow-haired Tatars". The Emperor agreed to this request. Relations with the states and countries west of China, specifically in Uyghur, were relatively smooth. The ministry only attempted to limit the number and size of incoming delegations. Yan found it inappropriate that both the official translators and escorts of Central Asian delegations were primarily of Central Asian origin. With the Emperor's approval, he stipulated that only ethnic Chinese individuals should be employed in these positions. Later, the censors accused Yan of hiring relatives of officials or wealthy Beijing merchants as translators in a patronizing manner. Yan defended himself by stating that he had no influence on the hiring process and that those in question had passed foreign language exams after three years of study, including a year's stay in the relevant border region. However, to avoid suspicion, he dismissed them. The Emperor approved the dismissal of translators from merchant families, but allowed those of official origin to remain.

=== Education and civil service examination ===
As the population continued to grow, the number of officials also increased, but the number of students and candidates for examinations grew even more rapidly. Yan organized the expansion and establishment of new state Confucian schools, particularly in the peripheral regions of the empire where there had previously been little interest in studying. He also appealed to the Emperor to increase the quotas for successful graduates of the provincial and metropolitan civil service examinations. This request was supported by provincial authorities who argued that the current graduates of the metropolitan and palace examinations only governed 10 to 20% of the counties, and that for the sake of effective administration, they should have a larger presence in the counties. While the Jiajing Emperor did increase the provincial quotas in some cases, he rejected other requests.

In regards to the civil service examinations, the Ministry of Rites under Yan expressed concern about the quality of candidates' examination essays. In 1537–38, due to intense competition, these essays had become excessively wordy and contained views that diverged from orthodox Neo-Confucianism, as well as unwarranted criticism of state ceremonies and security policies. The ministry was particularly troubled by the fact that examiners were positively evaluating these essays. The situation was most severe in Guangdong Province, where both students and examiners looked to the works of Lun Wenxu (1467–1513) and the esteemed philosopher Chen Xianzhang (1428–1500) as models. The Emperor approved the ministry's proposal to purge provincial examination boards and to dismiss or arrest examiners in Guangdong, as well as in Huguang, South Zhili, Jiangxi, and Henan. Students were also warned against using or referencing the works of unorthodox philosophers, including Chen Xianchang, his disciple Zhan Ruoshui (1466–1560), and Wang Yangming (1472–1529). Academies founded by these philosophers or their disciples were placed under state supervision or shut down. Zhan Ruoshui, who was then the minister of personnel in Nanjing, was not affected by these actions as officials from the ministries of personnel and rites agreed that he was not personally at fault. He was not dismissed from civil service until 1540, when the Emperor deemed some of his commentaries on the Book of Rites to be indirect criticisms of his policies.

=== Other matters ===
In 1537, one of the censors proposed strict measures against Buddhism, including reducing the number of monasteries, confiscating their property, and forcing monks ordained without state consent to return to secular life. Although the Emperor held a negative view of Buddhists and was sympathetic to the proposal, Yan argued for a more moderate approach. He believed that forcing thousands of monks back into secular life would only add to the already large population of vagrants and homeless people, potentially causing unrest. Additionally, he pointed out that the confiscated property would likely benefit the families of officials rather than the state treasury. As a compromise, Yan suggested gradually restricting Buddhism by halting repairs on temple buildings and prayer halls, ceasing the ordination of new monks, and encouraging existing monks to return to secular life. The Emperor ultimately approved this proposal.

The Ministry of Rites was responsible for addressing the issue of a large number of untrained and unlicensed physicians practicing in Beijing. There was a constant disagreement over the appropriate number of cooks needed for imperial ceremonies. The Office of Scrutiny for Revenue argued that the current number of 4,000 was excessive and suggested dismissing some of them, but the Court of Imperial Entertainments objected, stating that the official number was actually over 6,800 and that there was a shortage of almost 3,000. Eventually, Yan was able to reach a compromise with the Emperor, resulting in the hiring of only a few dozen new cooks. Additionally, the Emperor approved Yan's proposal to not return runaway cooks to Beijing, as it would unnecessarily burden the taxpayers.

The handling of petitions and disputes among princes of the imperial family was a delicate matter that required careful consideration. Additionally, the ministry was responsible for interpreting and recording signs from Heaven, both favorable and unfavorable. In more serious instances, such as the lightning strike that caused a fire in one of the palaces of the Forbidden City in 1537, the comet of 1539, or the lightning strike on the imperial ancestral temple in 1541, it was clear that Heaven was expressing its anger, but the exact cause was uncertain. It could have been due to negligence, corruption, or injustice within any ministry or office. In these situations, officials were instructed to perform atonement ceremonies, reflect on their actions, and undergo audits.

== Grand Secretary ==
In the early 1540s, Xia Yan lost the Emperor's trust and support. Although he had previously participated in Taoist ceremonies organized by the Emperor in the 1530s, he became cold towards them in the 1540s. The Emperor saw this change in attitude as an attack on his authority. Yan Song took advantage of this opportunity to remove his rival. In August 1542, the Emperor dismissed Xia from the Grand Secretariat. This left only Zhai Luan, who lacked a decisive personality, in the Grand Secretariat. In September, the Emperor appointed Yan as the new grand secretary.

Yan was known for showering the Emperor with attention and diligence, in stark contrast to Xia. He also showed strong support for the Emperor's interest in Taoism. While he openly endorsed Taoist prayers, he remained cautious about life-extending potions and offers to transform common metals into gold and silver. Despite his caution, he did recommend some Taoist alchemists to the Emperor, but he always advised that their medicines be carefully examined. The Emperor saw Yan as a father figure–a generation older, tall, always elegantly dressed, and full of energy. Yan carried out the Emperor's instructions meticulously, seeking his approval for all matters. He also resorted to dishonest methods to eliminate his opponents, which harmed his reputation.

In late November 1542, shortly after appointing Yan as grand secretary, the Jiajing Emperor permanently relocated from the Forbidden City to the West Park, which he transformed into a Taoist paradise for immortals. A select group of his closest aides, including the grand secretaries, resided with him in the West Park. Yan held the second-highest position in the Grand Secretariat, reporting to Zhai Luan. In the fall of 1544, Zhai's two sons were accused of cheating on the civil service examinations, leading to an investigation that uncovered numerous irregularities within the examination board. Although no specific charges were found against Zhai and his sons, the Emperor dismissed Zhai from his position and barred him from the civil service. Yan became the head of the Grand Secretariat. In an attempt to counterbalance Yan's influence, the Emperor recalled Xia to the Grand Secretariat in October 1545, and he assumed control. The two statesmen had a mutual dislike for each other, and Xia refused to consult with Yan or acknowledge his appointments. Feeling threatened, Yan formed an alliance with Xia's opponents and the Emperor's favorites, including Marquis Cui Yuan, General Lu Bing, and Marquis Qiu Luan.

In February 1548, Xia supported the campaign to Ordos without Yan's knowledge, ultimately bearing full responsibility for it. However, when the Emperor withdrew his support for the campaign due to reports of discontent in neighboring Shaanxi Province and unfavorable omens, Xia's enemies, including Yan, seized the opportunity to level a series of accusations against him. Xia was dismissed from his position in February 1548 and executed in October of the same year. Following Xia's downfall, Yan once again assumed the role of senior grand secretary.

As senior grand secretary, Yan held the most influential position in the government, despite the Emperor having other favorites. These included Duke Guo Xun (郭勛), Duke Zhu Xizhong (朱希忠), and the Taoist Tao Zhongwen. During the 1550s, the Grand Secretariat consisted of Yan Song, Xu Jie (grand secretary from 1552 to 1568), and Li Ben (grand secretary from 1549 to 1561). Xu was known for his energy and decisiveness, while Li often deferred to his colleagues' strong personalities when it came to discussions about governing the empire. The Emperor often played the grand secretaries against each other, and the bureaucracy was further influenced by bribes organized by Yan Song's son, Yan Shifan. With his father's support, Yan Shifan was appointed to various positions, including vice minister of the seal office, chief minister of the Court of Imperial Sacrifice, and junior vice minister of works. He was knowledgeable in economic, administrative, and strategic matters, but his self-confidence sometimes bordered on arrogance. While Yan Song spent most of his time with the Emperor in the West Park, Yan Shifan managed his father's household and eventually took over the latter's administrative duties as his father aged.

As a statesman, Yan Song was highly capable and even his harshest critics praised his diligence, responsibility, courtesy, and modesty. His equally competent son aided him in governing the empire. Together, they prioritized appointing and promoting qualified officials, while also removing any who posed a threat to their position. Despite facing numerous political crises and challenges, Yan Song managed to navigate them by delegating decision-making and responsibility to the appropriate ministries and offices; thus, the Ministry of Rites was responsible for handling matters related to the Mongols, while the Ministry of War dealt with their expulsion. Yan Song only retained control over personnel matters and occasionally policy decisions. He also avoided getting involved in the government's biggest issue at the time–state finances–leaving it to the ministries of revenue and works. In conflicts with the Mongols in the 1550s and pirates on the southeastern coast, Yan Song preferred a diplomatic approach, seeking compromise and negotiation. He often placed his support in a single regional representative with broad authority, through whom he could influence the situation. In contrast, Xu Jie corresponded with multiple local dignitaries. Thus, when defending the Beijing region against Mongol raids in 1550-1551, Yan Song backed General Qiu Luan; in addressing pirate problems on the southeast coast, he relied on Minister Zhao Wenhua and Supreme Commander Hu Zongxian.

== Downfall and death ==
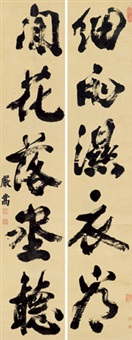
Yan Song's manuscript, a couplet in semi-cursive script.

Yan Song and Yan Shifan were infamous for their corruption and clientelism. They were heavily criticized for undermining traditional administrative practices, and Yan Shifan was specifically accused of corruption. They had many enemies who were determined to overthrow them, but the Yans fiercely defended themselves. In some cases, the Emperor executed officials who spoke out against Yan Song and his son. Despite the accusations, Yan Song vehemently denied any wrongdoing and convinced the Emperor that they were simply a result of factional conflicts. The Emperor, who was always quick to believe the worst of officials, accepted Yan Song's defense, even though the accusations were often vague, lacked evidence, or were clearly implausible.

As Yan Song aged, he became increasingly reliant on Yan Shifan, who not only wrote decrees but also interpreted the Emperor's wishes. By 1560, Yan Song was already eighty years old and no longer able to fulfill his own duties. The following year, his wife died and his son was unable to come to the palace due to mourning. This left Yan Song unable to carry out his duties without his son's assistance. On 31 December 1561, a fire broke out in the Emperor's Yongshou Palace in the West Park, forcing the Emperor to move to the smaller Yuxi Palace on the west bank of Lake Taiye. Yan Song suggested relocating the Emperor to an uninhabited palace in southern Beijing, where Emperor Yingzong had once been held under house arrest. He argued that rebuilding Yongshou Palace would be costly. The Emperor angrily rejected this idea and was supported by Xu Jie, who believed that the reconstruction could be done using materials intended for the construction of the Forbidden City. Xu Jie's son, Xu Fan, was put in charge of the reconstruction and completed it by the end of April. After this incident, the Emperor began to distance himself from Yan Song, only consulting him on Taoist ceremonies and leaving matters of government to Xu Jie. The Emperor's new Taoist confidant, Lan Daoheng (藍道行), also opposed Yan Song, and Lu Bing deserted Yan.

After facing further accusations from the censors, Yan Song was dismissed in June 1562 and sent home, though he was still honored. Yan Shifan was exiled to a distant border region, along with his two sons (Yan Hao, who was an officer of the Embroidered Uniform Guard, and Yan Hong, who was a drafter in the Granf Secretariat). Only one of Yan Song's grandsons was allowed to remain with him. Xu Jie was appointed as the new senior grand secretary. Despite the Emperor's respect for Yan Song, he believed that his son was the root of all the problems, and at the suggestion of a censor to rehabilitate those who had been punished in the past two decades for attacking Yan Song, the Emperor responded by imprisoning the official in question.

Yan Shifan defied orders and did not go into exile, instead managing to escape his guards and return to his family residence in Yuanzhou. His actions did not escape the attention of Liu Run, a high-ranking censor in Nanjing. In December 1564, Liu Run accused Yan Shifan of having connections with the Wokou pirates and plotting an uprising. The Emperor ordered the arrest of Yan Shifan and an investigation into the matter. Despite his son Yan Shaoting's attempts to warn the family, Yan Shifan was arrested in April 1564 and taken to Beijing. During the investigation, Yan Shifan was accused of plotting an armed uprising with pirates and Mongols, and the Emperor ordered a re-examination of the case. The re-examination confirmed the charges, leading to the execution of Yan Shifan and several others. Only a small number of the Yan family's servants were punished, while Yan Song and all of his relatives with official status, positions, and ranks were stripped of their titles. Additionally, the state confiscated all of the family's property, including 33,000 liang (1.2 tons) of gold, 2 million liang (74 tons) of silver, valuable items, houses, 57 estates, and 27,300 mu (1,500 ha) of fields and gardens.

Nearly blind, lonely, and impoverished, Yan lived for some time in a hut built next to his parents' tomb. He died in 1565, not long after his family's fall from grace. (Note: Some sources give 1567 as the year of his death.)

== See also ==
- List of premiers of China
