= Wang Xijue =

Chinese court official (1534–1614)

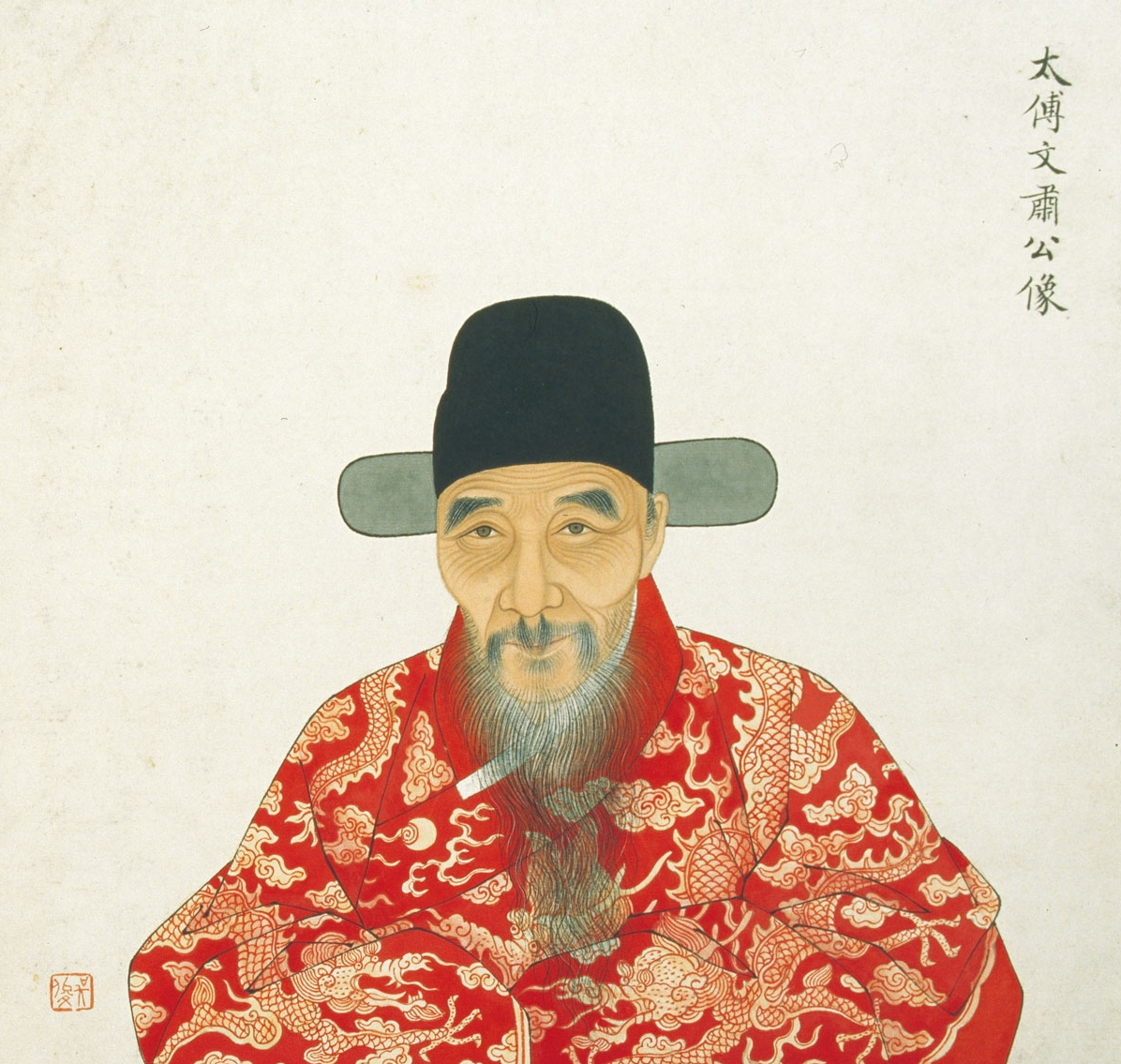

52nd Senior Grand Secretary
- In office 1593–1594
- Monarch: Wanli
- Preceded by: Zhao Zhigao
- Succeeded by: Zhao Zhigao

Personal details
- Born: 1534
- Died: 1614 (aged 80)

Wang Xijue (Chinese: 王錫爵, 1534–1614) was a Chinese politician. In a 1593 report to the emperor, he wrote: "The venerable elders of my home district explain that the reason grain is cheap despite poor harvests in recent years is due entirely to the scarcity of silver coin. The national government requires silver for taxes but disburses little silver in its expenditures. As the price of grain falls, tillers of the soil receive lower returns on their labors, and thus less land is put into cultivation."
