= Ming dynasty literature =

The literature of the Ming dynasty (1368–1644) was characterized by a strong renewal of entertainment literature in vernacular Chinese, including theatre, tales, short stories, and novels. Meanwhile, some previously practiced genres became more stagnant and unchanging.

In the theatre, chuanqi, a style of the Southern tradition, was characterized by its lengthy plays, often consisting of several dozen "acts". This style has gained popularity among the public. One of the most well-known plays in this style was The Peony Pavilion, written by Tang Xianzu. During the 16th century, chuanqi gave rise to kunqu, also known as Kunshan opera, which is considered to be the oldest form of Chinese opera still performed today. Another style, zaju, originated in the Northern tradition and flourished during the Yuan dynasty. It remains popular among the court and scholars, and has been influenced by the Southern theatre style.

In the genre of the novel, four extraordinary masterpieces were created: Romance of the Three Kingdoms, Water Margin, Journey to the West, and Jin Ping Mei.

== Early period: persecution, censorship, and Confucian orthodoxy ==
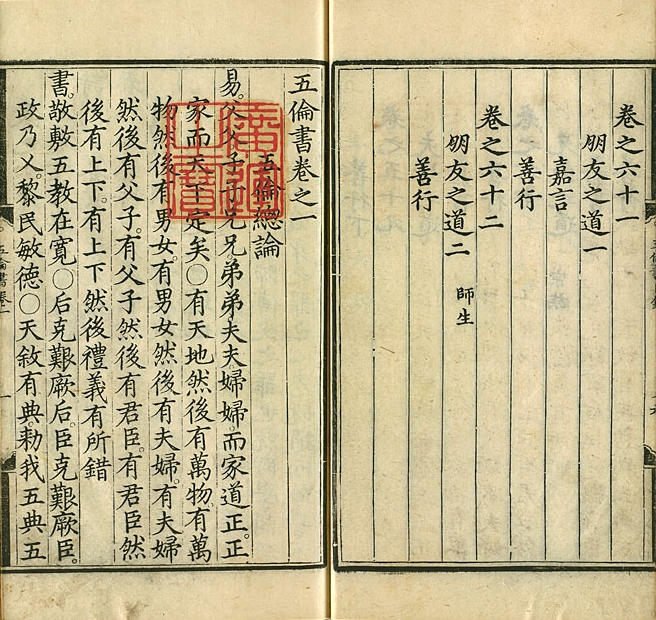
On the Five Relationships, written by the Xuande Emperor (r. 1425–1435), Imperial Household edition, 1448. The Five Relationships (father-son, sovereign-subject, elder brother-younger brother, husband-wife, friends) are central to Confucian morality.

During the Mongol-led Yuan dynasty (1271–1368), writers enjoyed a certain level of freedom due to the Mongols' lack of interest in literary affairs. This changed drastically with the establishment of the Ming dynasty in 1368. The first Ming emperor, the Hongwu Emperor (r. 1368–1398), implemented a policy of terror against his enemies, particularly scholars. Scholars were now forbidden from refusing to serve the imperial power, under penalty of death. This policy also affected scholars who were part of his entourage, such as Liu Ji (1311–1375), who was dismissed, and Song Lian, who was banished. Song Lian edited the official History of Yuan, reducing literature to writings inspired by the study of the Classics. The most notable case was that of Gao Qi, a poet from Suzhou who was sentenced to death in 1374. This led to the disappearance of a whole generation of artists and writers from Suzhou. The Hongwu Emperor implemented an educational policy based on the Confucian classics and the Four Books, interpreting Confucian morality and virtues in a strict and orthodox manner. Scholars were expected to show strict obedience to the sovereign. The intellectuals of Suzhou, a city that had long been under the control of the Hongwu Emperor's rival Zhang Shicheng, posed a threat to this policy of strict obedience. Writers began to practice self-censorship. For example, Qu You initially only distributed his collection of stories, New Stories After Snuffing the Lamp, in manuscript form to a restricted circle. It was not until around 1400 that the work was finally printed, but it was banned in 1442 due to its veiled criticism of the Ming dynasty and Confucian values. The printing of books facilitated their circulation, which caught the attention of the Ming government and led to increased censorship. In 1442, the director of the Imperial University, Li Shimian (李時勉), requested a ban on certain writings, including Qu You's collection, which he had discovered in the hands of his students. He also requested sanctions against those who printed or sold the work. At the time, there were no laws in place to regulate these professions or this type of work. It was not until a revised edition of the Qing code in 1740 that measures were put in place against printed works of pornographic fiction and those involved in their production and distribution.

The Yongle Emperor (r. 1402–1424) rose to power through usurpation and worked to exclude other members of the imperial family from political responsibilities. Many of these family members turned to pursuits such as literature. Some even became renowned writers, including playwrights Zhu Quan (1378–1448) and Zhu Youdun (1379–1439). The main theme of Zhu Youdun's plays was loyalty to the emperor, and both authors praised Confucian values. The government also took a particular interest in the baguwen, or "eight-legged essay", which was used for the imperial examinations. These compositions were expected to demonstrate strict adherence to Confucian orthodoxy, as defined by the Song thinker Zhu Xi (1130–1200). Additionally, the Yongle Emperor was a major proponent of publishing enterprises, commissioning collections of Confucian texts such as the Xingli daquan (性理大全; 'Great Compendium on Human Nature and Principle'), the Wujing daquan (五經大全; 'The complete meaning of the Five Classics'), and the Sishu daquan (四書大全; 'The complete meaning of the Four Books'). These texts were then included in the official program for candidates taking the examinations.

== 1450–1520 ==
After the death of the Yongle Emperor, the threat from the Mongols increased. In 1449, the Ming army suffered a defeat during the Battle of Tumu, resulting in the capture of Emperor Yingzong (r. 1435–1449). This led to a period of political instability until the young son of Emperor Yingzong, the Chenghua Emperor (r. 1465–1487), ascended the throne. (Note: Emperor Yingzong was released in 1450 but was placed under house arrest by his younger brother, the Jingtai Emperor, who ascended the throne during the political turmoil after the Battle of Tumu and successfully defended Beijing, the Ming capital. In 1457, Emperor Yingzong regained the throne during a palace coup (r. 1457–1464).) During this period of political and military instability, scholars were able to express criticisms of the government more freely, although this still carried risks, as they could face corporal punishment (known as tingzhang 廷杖; 'beating at court') or exile for their remonstrances. Despite this, there was a trend towards a relaxation of government control over scholars. The emperors also played a significant role in promoting popular and dramatic culture, with many of them being fond of popular songs and tunes sung in theatres. This made these forms of entertainment popular among the entire intellectual elite, making this period a golden age for sanqu (a variant of qu).

The eight-legged essay was a necessary genre for any scholar seeking to establish a successful career and showcase their literary prowess. Despite its rigid structure, it was still possible to demonstrate talent within it. One of the most renowned figures in this field was Wang Ao (1450–1524), who achieved first place in both provincial and capital-level examinations. He was known for his ability to adhere to formal conventions while also incorporating elegance and originality in his writing. The significance of this genre led to criticism, with Wang Ao himself being a prominent voice in advocating for the inclusion of other literary genres in the examinations, in order to attract scholars with diverse abilities. His suggestions were disregarded at the time. During the reign of the Chenghua Emperor, there was a notable increase in the demand for anthologies of examination essays. The ultimate achievement for a scholar was to be accepted into the prestigious Hanlin Academy, which was reserved for the most talented individuals. Li Dongyang (1447–1516), the highest-ranking official in the academy, was an expert in the literary trends of his time and played a significant role in supporting and promoting younger scholars.

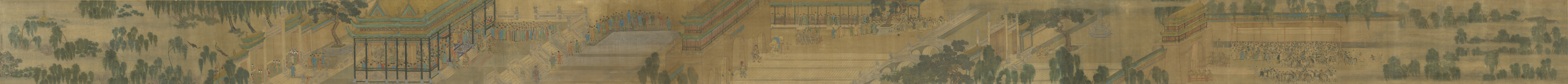
Consultation of examination results. Scroll attributed to Qiu Ying (active around 1530–1552). National Palace Museum, Taiwan.

Li Dongyang's prominent position was not without its difficulties. He faced opposition from the "Earlier Seven Masters of the Ming", (Note: The Seven Masters are: Li Mengyang (1475–1530), He Jingming (何景明; 1483–1521), Kang Hai (1475–1540), Wang Jiusi, Wang Tingxiang, Bian Gong (邊貢; 1476–1532), and Xu Zhenqing (徐禎卿; 1479–1511).) a group associated with the fugu (复古; 'revive antiquity') movement. This group, with the exception of one member, was entirely from the North and was active in the Ming capital Beijing from 1496 to 1505. They had close ties with Li Mengyang (1475–1530), the main figure of the movement. Their main focus was revitalizing poetry, but they also had a general interest in political issues. Li Mengyang's criticism of the court led to multiple imprisonments and even death sentences, as the powerful eunuch Liu Jin used his influence to silence dissent, but not all criticism of the government was as direct. Two other members of the Seven Masters, Kang Hai (1475–1541) and Wang Jiusi (1468–1551), were part of the Hanlin Academy and used their influence to prevent Li Mengyang's execution. They were also known for writing plays that were critical of the political climate at the time.

Suzhou experienced a revival of its cultural significance as evidenced by the rise of scholars like Wang Ao, but it was not until the early 16th century, when the Jiangnan region became the main economic hub of China, that Suzhou regained its status as a cultural center. This was largely due to the efforts of urban merchants. In terms of culture, the scholars of the region shifted their focus away from administrative careers and instead made a living through the sale of paintings, calligraphy, and poetry—three activities that were closely intertwined in the practice of scholars at the time. Money itself became a popular subject in poetry, a new development. Some of the most notable scholars from Suzhou during this period were Shen Zhou (1427–1509), Zhu Yunming (1460–1526), Wen Zhengming (1470–1559), and Tang Yin (1470–1524), who were primarily known for their skills in painting and calligraphy.

== From 1520 to the early 1570s ==
Following the death of the heirless Zhengde Emperor (r. 1505–1521), his cousin Zhu Houcong ascended the throne at the age of fourteen as the Jiajing Emperor and reigning from 1521 to 1566. The Jiajing Emperor was known for his autocratic personality and lack of interest in governing the empire, resulting in the court eunuchs gaining effective power. This led to some scholars speaking out against the Emperor, with Hai Rui being one of the most well-known cases. He was imprisoned and tortured for his remonstrances, but later became a respected literary figure. (Note: Thus, the play Hai Rui Dismissed from Office (1961) by Wu Han was perceived as a critique of Mao Zedong. It served as a pretext for the outbreak of the Cultural Revolution.) During the Great Rites Controversy, over a hundred scholars were beaten, resulting in some deaths. One of the survivors, Yang Shen, was exiled to Yunnan where he was able to showcase his literary talents through a wide range of works. He gained fame throughout the empire, particularly for his poetic correspondence with his wife, Huang E, who became known as the greatest poetess of the Ming dynasty.

From the mid-16th century onwards, there was a growing effort among scholars to re-evaluate the role of women in literature, which continued until the end of the Ming dynasty. During this time, previously overlooked texts began to resurface, such as the palindrome attributed to Su Hui, a 4th-century poet. Anthologies of women's literature were also compiled, starting in the 1550s with Tian Yiheng's (田藝衡) Shi nüshi (Female Talents in Poetry, 1557), which featured works by thirty-six Ming poetesses. As the demand for women's literature grew, some wives of scholars also became writers, such as the poet Shen Yixiu (沈宜修), who later became an editor for one of these anthologies in 1636. Some of the texts attributed to women may have been forged by the editors to meet this demand. On the other hand, some fictional stories were based on real events, such as the story of Li Yuying (李玉英, 1506–after 1522) told by Feng Menglong (1574–1646). Li's two erotic poems (Note: Translation of the poems into English in Kang-i Sun Chang (ed.) and Haun Saussy (ed.), Women Writers of Traditional China: An Anthology of Poetry and Criticism, Stanford University Press, 1999, pp. 178–179) resulted in a death sentence, but she was ultimately pardoned by the Jiajing Emperor. This story can be found in official archives.

During this period, the novel emerged as a popular genre, drawing from earlier sources in the vernacular and circulating among storytellers. Three notable works from this time include the oldest known edition of the Romance of the Three Kingdoms' from 1522, Water Margin which was printed around 1550, and Journey to the West which was published during the reign of the Jiajing Emperor. Scholars during this time also had a taste for rewriting earlier literary sources, not just limited to women's or popular literature, but also seen in the theatre. Li Kaixian was a prime example of this, as he edited an anthology of plays from the Yuan dynasty (in the form of zaju) and also wrote a chuanqi (a southern theatrical form) called Baojian ji (寶劍記; 'Record of the Precious Sword'), which was inspired by a passage from Water Margin.

In the field of poetry, the fugu school saw a resurgence in the 1550s with the emergence of the "Latter Seven Masters", led by Li Panlong. Li was most renowned for his collections of Tang poetry. Following his died in 1570, the most prominent member of the Seven Masters was Wang Shizhen. His diverse poetic works and prose extend beyond the boundaries of the fugu movement, making him more comparable to Yang Shen.

== Publishing during the Wanli era (1573–1620) ==
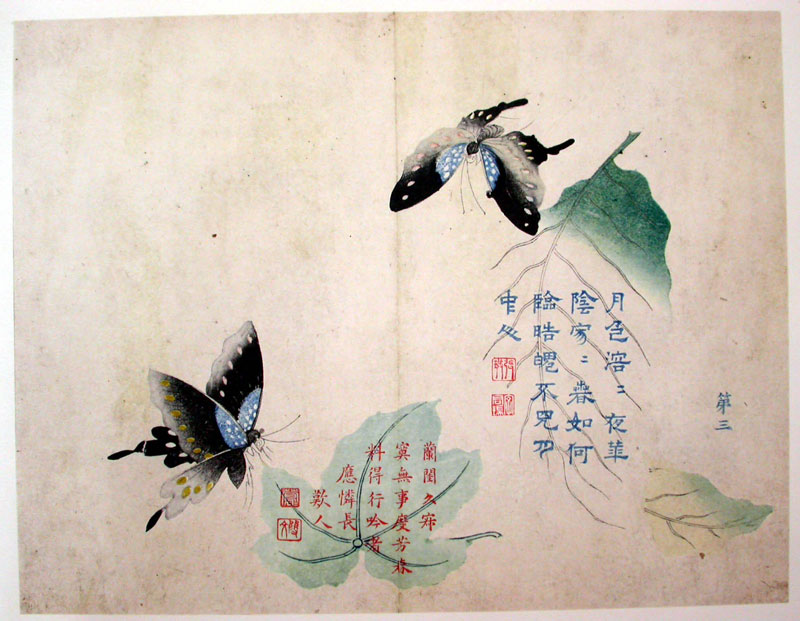
Color illustration of the play Romance of the Western Chamber by Wang Shifu (circa 1300). Edition by Min Qiji from 1640. Museum of East Asian Art, Cologne.

At the beginning of the 16th century, printed books had already surpassed manuscript books in number, but it was during the Wanli era (1573–1620) that significant changes occurred in the publishing industry. The rise in literacy rates, an increase in urban readership, and a decrease in production costs led to an unprecedented growth in commercial publishing. While the majority of published works (about two-thirds) were not literary in nature, including commentaries on the Classics, history books, encyclopedias, and devotional works aimed at a female audience, there was also a significant increase in literary works related to the theatre, such as plays and collections of songs. The sheer volume of printed books was such that private libraries could now amass over 10,000 books or tens of thousands of individual volumes (with several volumes making up a single book), a feat that was previously impossible. This growth in publishing also reached even the most remote regions of the empire, as merchants and scholars traveled more and "bookshop boats" traveled along waterways. Publishers were established in various regions of the empire, each specializing in different market segments. For example, Suzhou was known for its expensive, lavishly illustrated luxury editions, while Fujian was known for its affordable illustrated editions, and Anhui was renowned for the quality of its engravers. The technique of multi-color printing, which had been lost since the Song dynasty, reemerged around 1600, being used for both illustrations and text. Initially, it was used in a more artisanal manner, but it soon became a specialty of two publishers: Min Qiji and Hu Zhengyan. Towards the end of the dynasty, authors began to take a more active role in publishing their works during their lifetime, a departure from the previous custom of friends or family publishing an author's work after their death.

== Literary societies, 1570s–1644 ==
The decline of imperial power during the reign of the last three Ming emperors—Wanli Emperor (r. 1573–1620), Tianqi Emperor (r. 1620–1627), and Chongzhen Emperor (r. 1627–1644)—led to an increase in rivalries within the literary elite, resulting in the formation of numerous literary societies. These societies served as preparation for examinations, as well as schools of poetry and political groups. One of the most prominent societies was the Donglin Academy, which was reestablished in 1604 in Wuxi and recruited members from all over the empire. During the reign of the Tianqi Emperor, the eunuch Wei Zhongxian persecuted the academy's members and their knowledge for political reasons. Many of these societies were short-lived and had only a small number of scholars, but membership in a literary society often proved to be advantageous in passing the examinations, as the number of candidates had significantly increased while the number of available spots remained constant. The fushe society (復社; 'Revival Society') was the most influential of these societies towards the end of the dynasty, with many of its members achieving success in the examinations. Notable scholars who were part of the fushe society included poet Chen Zilong (1608–1647), thinker Huang Zongxi, poet Wu Weiye (1609–1672), and writer Gu Yanwu (1613–1682). Many of these scholars remained loyal to the fallen Ming dynasty even after the Qing dynasty came into power.

One of the primary activities of literary societies during the 1570s and onwards was the production of anthologies containing examination essays, along with accompanying notes and commentaries. These works were highly popular and widely read during this time period. Due to the limited number of scholars who were able to pass the examinations, some individuals gained recognition as authors of these anthologies, despite their own failure in the tests. The examination essay (baguwen), was considered a distinct literary genre that demanded creativity and skill, making it open to critical evaluation.

== Theatre ==
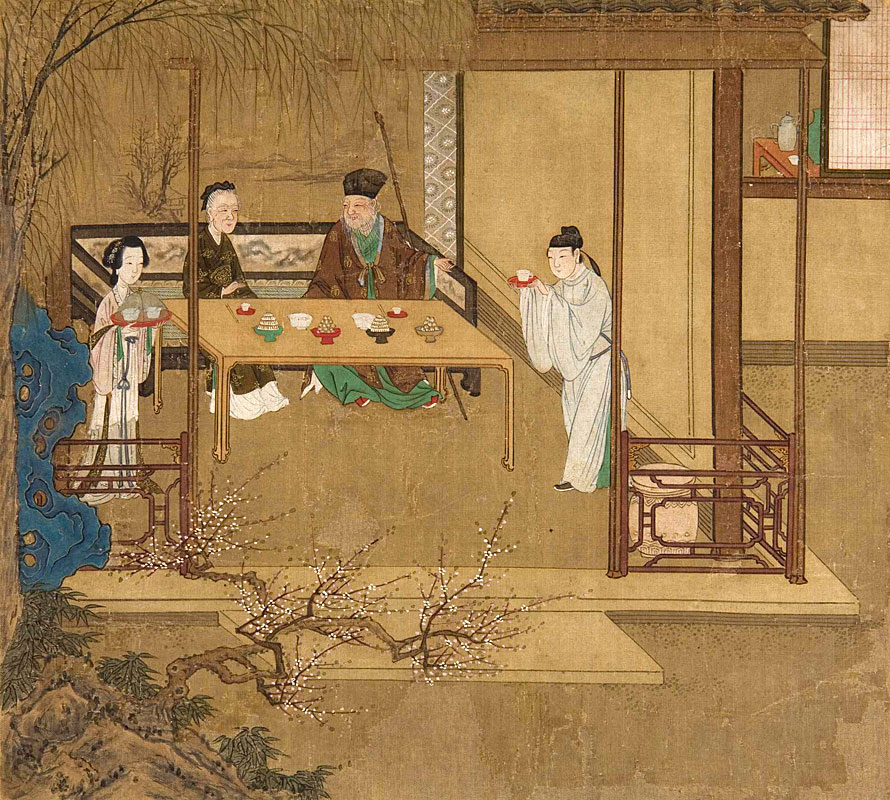
The Story of the Lute by Gao Ming. Color illustration dating from the late 16th century or early 17th century.

In the 16th century, the Jiangnan region emerged as the economic center of the empire. This shift in power also led to the decline of the northern zaju theatre, which became marginalized by the beginning of the 17th century. The kunqu style, specific to Suzhou, the capital of Jiangnan, gained popularity in other provinces. This refined style was favored by the elites and led to the disappearance of commercial troupes in favor of private troupes, often exclusively female and funded by wealthy families. These troupes only performed excerpts or single acts from plays, rather than full productions, which encouraged the creation of shorter plays. The Ming dynasty saw a significant development in publishing, with many plays being released in luxurious editions. Anthologies, such as Zang Maoxun's Selected Plays from the Yuan Dynasty (元曲选) and Mao Jin's Sixty Varieties of Music tunes (六十种曲), were also published during this time. These plays were no longer solely intended for performance, but also for reading by a literate audience. Theatre became more literary and less dramatic in nature.

Theatre was highly valued at the imperial court, considered a prized art form. The lavishness of the performances and the meticulous attention to detail in the arias of playwright Zhu Youdun's plays were intended to showcase the grandeur of the dynasty.

=== Chuanqi and kunqu, theatres of the South ===
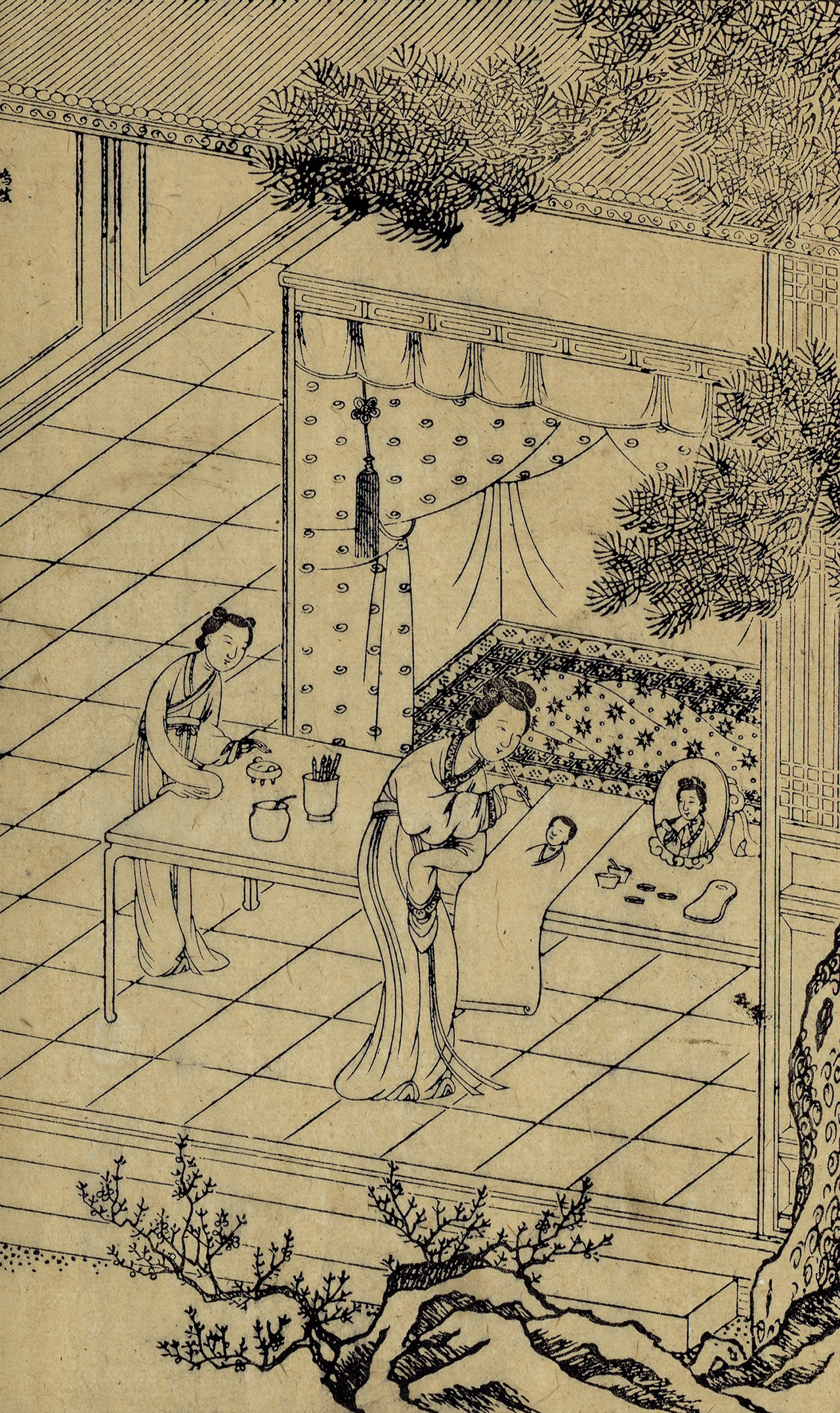
The Peony Pavilion by Tang Xianzu. Illustration from an edition dating from the Wanli era (1572–1620).

Alongside the dominant theatrical genre of the Yuan dynasty, the zaju, there existed another form known as the nanxi, or southern theatre, which was mainly performed during the Southern Song dynasty. The Ming chuanqi, a form of southern theatre, can be seen as an heir to the nanxi. There are several characteristics that differentiate the chuanqi from the zaju. For example, a chuanqi could extend over several dozen acts and the performances could last for several weeks. The music used in chuanqi performances was also different, with the music of the South being more languid compared to the harsher music of the North. This was one of the reasons why the repertoire of the chuanqi often focuses on love stories, as they are well-suited to this type of music. Additionally, all roles in chuanqi performances were capable of singing.

The oldest surviving anonymous pieces of chuanqi can be traced back to the 13th century. This anonymity, along with the uncertainties surrounding the authorship of the "four great chuanqi" of the 14th century, highlights the close connection between this genre and popular literature. During the transition from the Yuan to the Ming dynasty, The Story of the Lute (Pipa ji), a forty-two-act play, was written by Gao Ming (1307–1371), which was considered the first significant piece of the genre and celebrates filial piety and conjugal duties. The chuanqi genre reached its peak during the 16th century, when scholars openly showed interest in it. Tang Xianzu (1550–1616) was one of the most well-known authors of chuanqi, having written four plays known as the Four Dreams. The Peony Pavilion (1598) was his most famous work, consisting of fifty-five acts that explore themes of love, life, and death, as well as challenging family and social conventions.

Over time, various musical adaptations of chuanqi have emerged, resulting in regional variations. The most well-known of these was kunqu, which is still performed today and has been recognized as part of the Intangible Cultural Heritage of Humanity since 2001. In the mid-16th century, a musician named Wei Liangfu (魏良輔) from Kunshan created a new musical style by blending southern music with melodies and instruments from the north. This new style came to be known as kunqu, and it was considered the most refined genre of Chinese opera theatre. One of the earliest works written in this style was Washing Silken Gauze (浣紗記) by Liang Chenyu (梁辰魚; 1520–1593), a piece that greatly contributed to the prestige of the genre with its poetic elements.

=== Zaju, theatre of the North ===
Zaju continued to be popular among playwrights despite its compact structure of only four acts (compared to the several dozen acts of a chuanqi). Approximately 200 playwrights wrote around 500 zaju plays, although only a third of them remain today. The form of zaju was influenced by southern theatre, leading to a potential increase in the number of acts and the use of multiple actors singing in the same play. Additionally, southern and northern musical styles were combined. Jia Zhongming (賈仲名; around 1343–1422), a prominent author during the end of the Yuan and beginning of the Ming dynasties, was responsible for introducing these changes. The themes of zaju plays shifted away from reality and towards the fantastical and religious. While this may have resulted in less originality, the plays became more refined in terms of literary style.

Two members of the imperial family, Zhu Quan and Zhu Youdun, played significant roles in the Ming zaju period. Zhu Quan was known for his work, the Catalogue of Correct Pronunciations of Supreme Harmony (Taihezhengyinpu, 1398), which focuses on the prosodic and phonological rules of Yuan zaju. Meanwhile, Zhu Youdun claimed to be the successor of Guan Hanqing and incorporated some of his themes into his plays. Many of his works revolve around love stories involving courtesans. He also wrote two plays about the brigands of the Mount Liang, which later served as inspiration for the famous novel Water Margin. These plays are A Leopard Monk (Baozi heshang) and Spurning Riches out of Righteousness (Zhangyi shucai).

Xu Wei (1521–1593) was a prominent author who wrote the first treatise on southern theatre, Nanci xulu, in which he compares it to northern theatre, zaju. He is also known for his five zaju plays, including Four Cries of a Gibbon, which was a collective title for four of his works. Xu Wei's plays are known for their eccentric themes, reflecting the personality of their author. For instance, two of his plays feature a female protagonist disguised as a man. Ci Mulan was based on the story of Mulan, while Girl Graduate tells the tale of a woman who disguises herself as a man to take the examinations.

Other notable authors in this genre include Kang Hai, Wang Jiusi, Feng Weimin (馮惟敏; 1511–1578), Ye Xianzu (葉憲祖; 1566–1641), and Ling Mengchu (1580–1644).

=== Theatrical critique ===
During the Yuan dynasty, there were already texts discussing the theatre, with the intention of identifying the best authors, actors, and actresses, as well as exploring singing and theatrical techniques. During the Ming dynasty, a true literary criticism of the theatre emerged. Xu Wei's treatise and Zang Maoxun's anthology paved the way for this development. The first treatise on Ming theatre, titled Musical Principles (Qulü), was published in 1610 by Wang Jide (d. 1623). In terms of theatrical poetics, there is a strong emphasis on the concept of ziran ("spontaneity"). Formal aspects are highly valued, particularly the use of qu ("song"), which also refers to the theatre as a whole. On the other hand, moral and ideological aspects are not given as much importance. Confucianism was a dominant ideology among scholars, even if it was not explicitly expressed. This influence can also be seen in the plays of kunqu. Wang Jide attempts to reconcile the principles of the Tang Xianzu school, which focuses on the literary aspect, with those of the Shen Jing (沈璟) school, which prioritizes adherence to prosodic and musical rules. Another writer, Li Yu (also known as Li Liweng), also wrote about the theatre. He emphasizes the importance of structure (jiegou) and believes that only extraordinary stories should be staged.

== Prose fiction ==
=== Short story ===
The chuanqi genre, a type of short story written in classical language, first gained popularity during the Tang dynasty. It experienced a revival in the 14th century with the publication of Qu You's New Stories After Snuffing the Lamp, which prominently featured supernatural elements. Li Zhen (1376–1452) also contributed to the genre with his collection Jiandeng yuhua (More Stories Written While Trimming the Lamp), which focused more on love stories. These two collections were considered to be of equal quality and were highly successful in the literary world. In the 15th century, Qu You's volume was banned due to the belief that it distracted young people from studying for exams. Despite falling into obscurity in China, the collections by Qu You and Li Zhen gained popularity in Japan during the 17th century and influenced writers who were drawn to the fantastical, such as Hayashi Razan and Ueda Akinari.

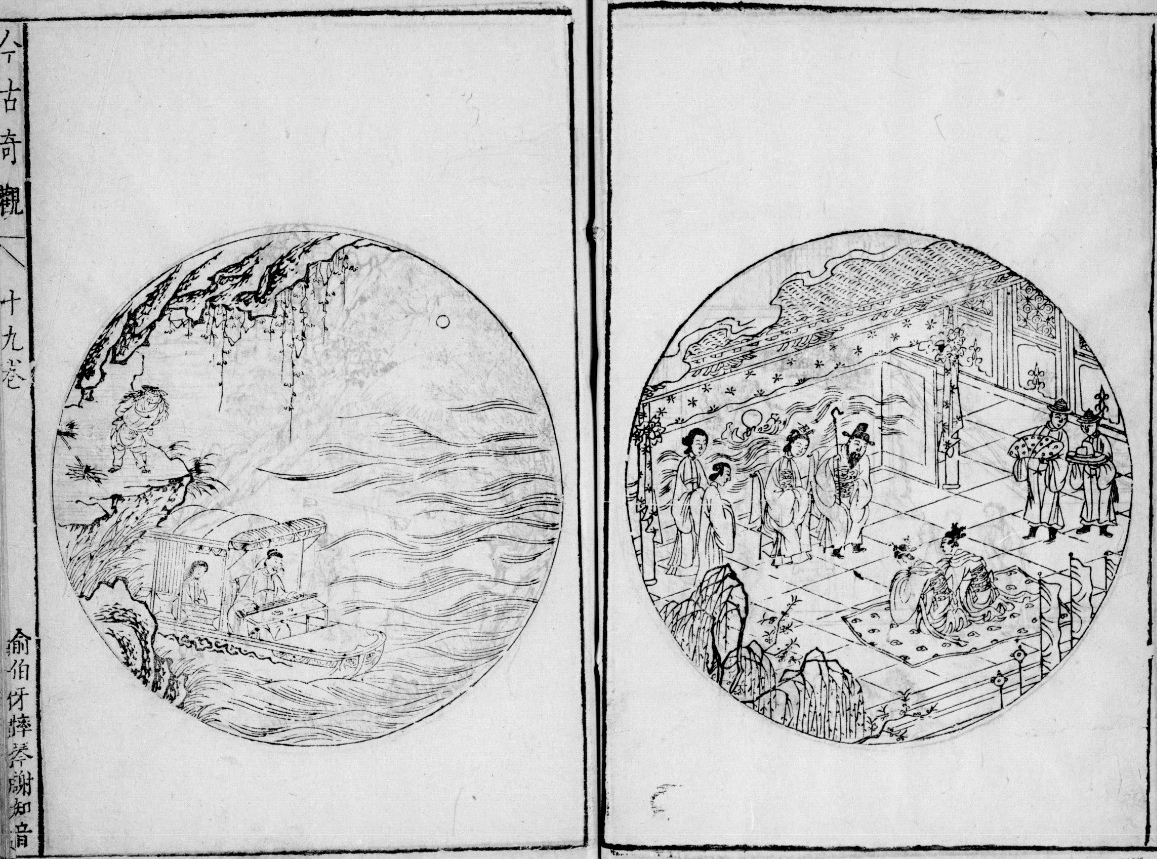
Illustration of the Spectacles in Ancient and Modern Times, edition from around 1640–1644.

During the late dynasty, there was a notable rise in the popularity of short stories written in the vernacular (known as huaben), largely due to the attention they received from scholars. One of the earliest collections was compiled by Hong Pian between 1541 and 1551, titled Qingping shantang huaben or Vernacular stories from the Qingping mountain hall, which contained six volumes of ten short stories each (although only twenty-nine have survived). However, it was primarily the works of Feng Menglong and Ling Mengchu that brought huaben to prominence.

Feng Menglong was a versatile writer who had a keen interest in a variety of popular genres, ranging from songs to humorous tales. His most notable work is a trilogy of collections known as the Three Words, which were published between 1620 and 1625. Each collection consists of forty huaben. While some of these huaben are adaptations of stories from the Song and Yuan dynasties, others are original creations by the author, written in the style of those earlier works. This genre is known as ni huaben, or "imitation story scripts". Overall, the Three Words was considered a masterpiece of popular literature, blending moral lessons with entertainment. The stories cover a diverse range of genres, including love stories and detective tales.

Feng Menglong's success in the commercial market inspired another writer, Ling Mengchu, to publish two volumes of forty stories each in 1628 and 1633. This collection, titled Pai'an jingqi, or Slapping the Table in Amazement, also became popular. Ling had a unique concept of what was considered "extraordinary," which was often found in everyday situations. For example, one of his stories features a character who faces misfortune but ultimately becomes wealthy thanks to a crate of mandarin oranges. Unlike Feng, Ling Mengchu drew inspiration from classical Chinese literature and rewrote the stories in the vernacular language.

In 1640, an anthology titled Jingu qiguan, or Spectacles in Ancient and Modern Times, was published. This anthology included around forty stories from the works of Feng Menglong and Ling Mengchu. The anthology was a huge success, but the names of these two authors were later forgotten until they were rediscovered in the 20th century.

=== Novel ===
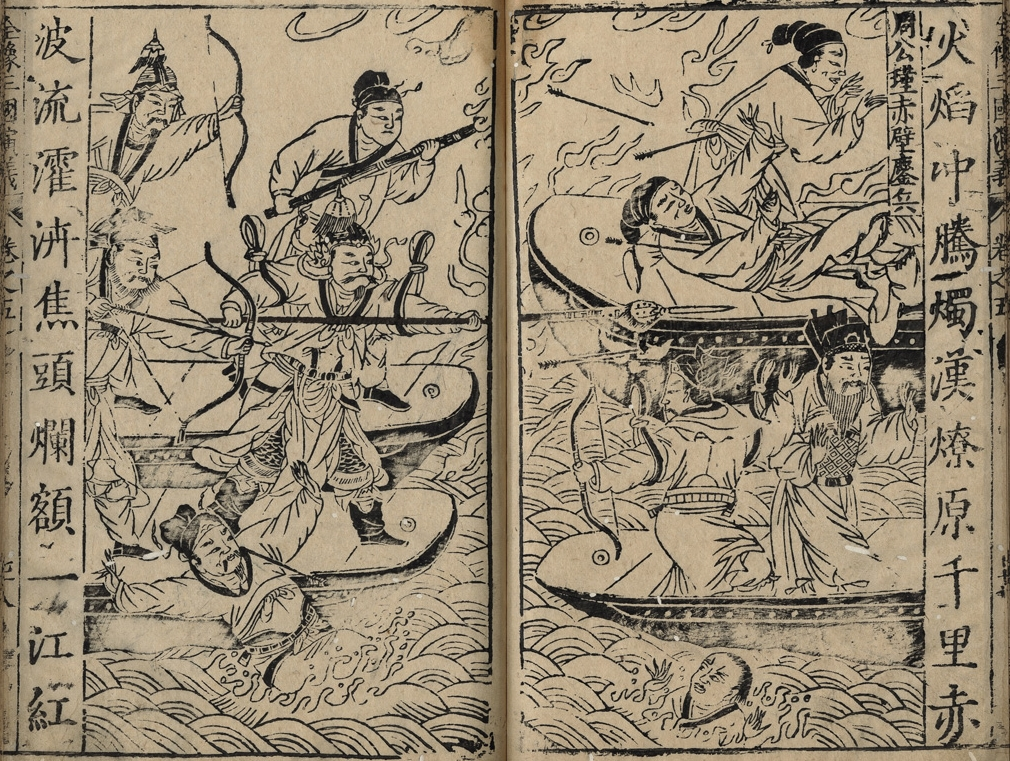
New corrected edition of the Romance of the Three Kingdoms, dating from 1591. Illustration of the episode of the Battle of Red Cliffs.

The success of the storytellers' tales and the progress of printing during the Song dynasty led to the recording of these tales in written form. It was the historical tales, which were often recited over multiple sessions by the storytellers, that likely gave rise to the novel genre, which became the most popular form of literature during the Ming dynasty. These tales, known as pinghua, were initially short in length. However, there are surviving examples from the 14th century that feature engravings occupying the upper third of each page. In its canonical form, the Chinese novel is a lengthy work, often spanning nearly a million characters and a hundred chapters. The most well-known of these novels, referred to as the "Four Masterworks" in the early 17th century, each represent a different sub-genre: Romance of the Three Kingdoms for historical fiction, Water Margin for swashbuckling adventure, Journey to the West for fantasy, and Jin Ping Mei for the novel of manners.

The novel Romance of the Three Kingdoms was the oldest of the four and is attributed to a mysterious author, Luo Guanzhong, who wrote it in the second half of the 14th century. The oldest known edition dates back to 1522. A commented version by Li Zhi was published during the Wanli era (1573–1620), but the most popular version, consisting of 120 chapters, was from Mao Zonggang in 1679 during the Qing dynasty. The novel was written in a mixture of Classical and Vernacular (with popular expressions) and tells the story of the struggle between the Three Kingdoms of Shu, Wei, and Wu for hegemony after the fall of the Han dynasty. Its main source is the Records of the Three Kingdoms by Chen Shou (233–297), a historical work, as well as other historical sources. It also incorporates legendary elements that were spread by storytellers and the theatre. The popular versions of the novel present fairly simple characters, with the "good guys" pitted against the "bad guys", but the 1522 version, which synthesizes both historical and popular versions, adds depth and complexity to the characters, although this is somewhat lost in the Qing version. The novel does not have a clear winner, as the kingdom of Wei gives birth to a weak dynasty, the Jin, and this adds a tragic element to the story.

Water Margin (Shuihu zhuan) is based on a historical event—the rebellion led by Song Jiang at the end of the Northern Song dynasty in the early twelfth century. Song Jiang and his "thirty-six captains" quickly became popular heroes in oral literature due to their fight against injustices. Their exploits were later amplified and adapted by professional storytellers and included in certain huaben during the Southern Song and Jin dynasties. In the Yuan dynasty, the legendary bandits were portrayed in the zaju theatre, now numbering one hundred and eight. The original version of the novel, believed to have been written at the end of the Yuan or beginning of the Ming, was lost and the true author, whether it was Shi Nai'an or Luo Guanzhong, remains debated to the present-day. Different versions of the novel, varying in length, circulated until the end of the Ming dynasty. In 1644, Jin Shengtan, an anti-conformist, produced a truncated edition of the work consisting of seventy-one chapters, which was considered to have a higher literary quality than previous versions. This version remained popular until the twentieth century.

A historical fact serves as the inspiration for the novel Journey to the West (Xiyou ji): the journey of Buddhist monk Xuanzang to India during the Tang dynasty in search of sutras. The novel follows the fantastical adventures that occur during this pilgrimage, with Xuanzang accompanied by four companions who are half-human, half-animal, including Pig and Monkey, the two main characters. The monkey is the true hero of the story. Amidst this Buddhist quest, the most extravagant episodes are infused with inexhaustible humor. The authorship of the work is attributed to Wu Cheng'en (around 1500–1582), although it has undergone multiple variations over time, with the most refined version likely dating back to around 1570. Many critics have interpreted the work through a Taoist lens, but its richness cannot be reduced to either Buddhism or Taoism. Hu Shih has even compared this unique work to Lewis Carroll's Alice's Adventures in Wonderland.

=== Erotic and pornographic literature ===
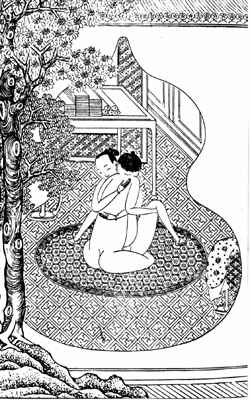
Illustration of the Su'e pian, an erotic novel dating from around 1610.

In the 16h and 17th centuries, there was a deliberate production of erotic and pornographic literature, primarily in the vernacular, which coincided with mass printing and distribution of vernacular fiction during the same time period. This phenomenon can be attributed to the "fin de siècle" atmosphere, as the Ming dynasty was in decline and societal morals were becoming more relaxed. However, with the establishment of the Qing dynasty, the prudish morality of the new ruling power and the effectiveness of censorship led to a decline in this genre. Despite this, these works continued to circulate underground. From a Confucian perspective (as the concept of sin in the Christian sense does not exist in China), sexuality is viewed as an excess that leads to punishment. These fantasies often revolve around married women and widows, who are expected to remain chaste as marriage and chastity in widowhood are considered pillars of Confucian morality.

The Ruyijun zhuan (The Lord of Perfect Satisfaction) was considered a pioneer of the genre, as it recounts the supposed loves of Empress Wu Zetian. Monks and nuns, whose celibacy was often questioned, also play a role in these stories, such as in the Dengcao heshang (The Candlewick Monk) and the Sengni niehai (Monks and Nuns in a Sea of Sins). Other popular erotic Ming dynasty novels include The Embroidered Couch, Su'e pian, Langshi, Chipozi zhuan, Zhulin yeshi, and the most well-regarded of them all, Jin Ping Mei.

== Essays ==
During the 16th and 17th centuries, there was a lack of renewal in classical genres, leading to the emergence of the "short essays" (xiaopin wen) as a popular genre. Su Shi (1037–1101) was a precursor to this genre, which consisted of short texts on a variety of subjects such as letters, notes, and travel stories. The Gong'an group in Hubei, led by the three Yuan brothers, played a significant role in elevating the genre to its peak. The Yuan brothers placed popular genres such as novels, theatre, and songs on the same level as classical genres. Among the three brothers, Yuan Hongdao (1568–1610) was the most well known for his prose work, which combines concision, subjectivity, and delicacy.

The travelogue genre (youji) saw a resurgence in popularity thanks to the contributions of Yuan Hongdao, but the most renowned travel writer of the Ming dynasty was Xu Xiake (1586–1641), who spent nearly forty years exploring various regions of China. His extensive journal serves as a testament to his deep interest in geography.

== Poetry ==
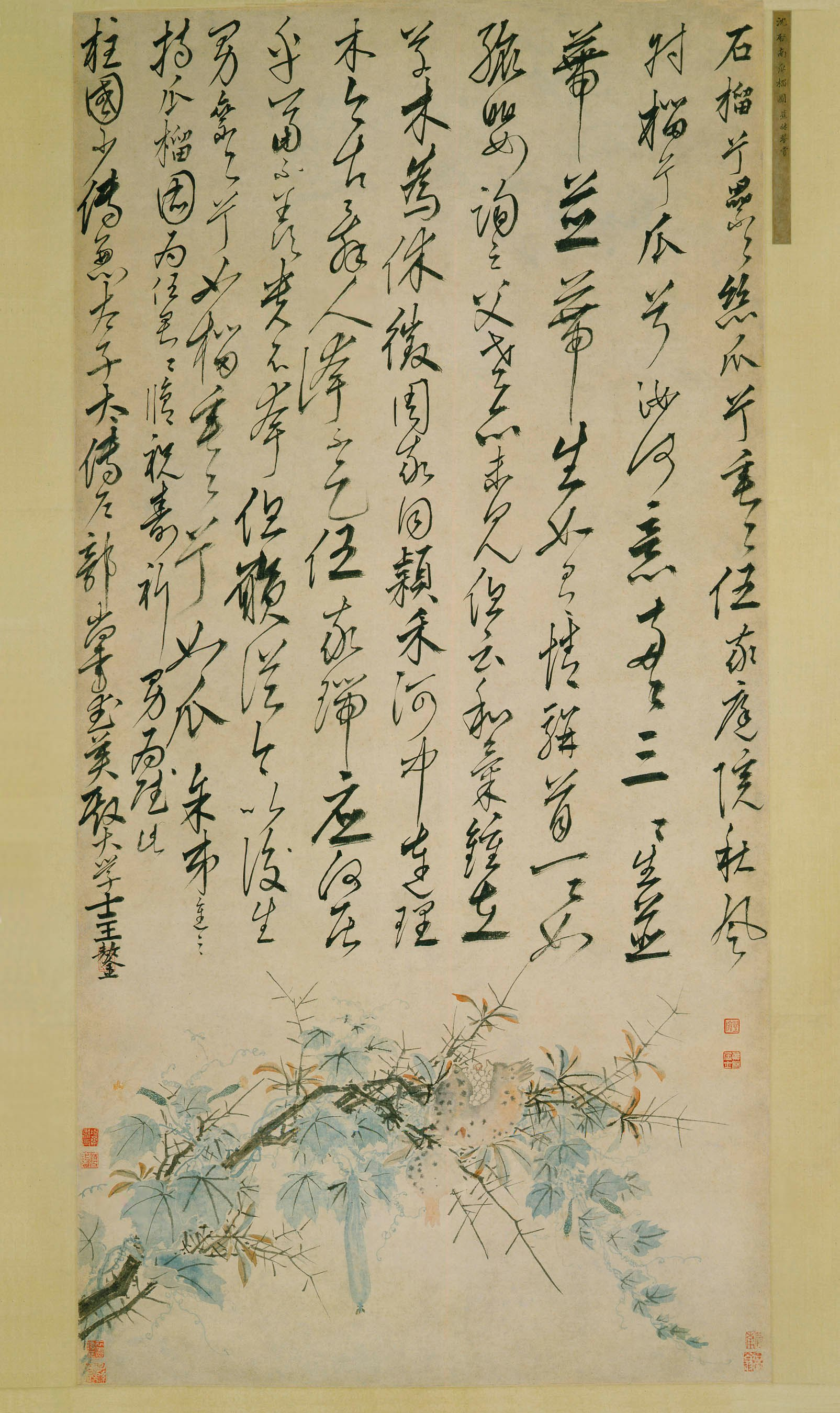
Ode to Pomegranate and Melon Vine, painting by Shen Zhou and poem by Wang Ao. Circa 1506–1509. Detroit Institute of Arts.

Gao Qi, who lived in Suzhou, was widely regarded as the greatest poet of the Ming dynasty. He was known for his strong attachment to freedom as a poet and his distrust of politics. In his poetry, he expressed a strong sense of individualism that went against the constraints of serving in a position of power. He was executed in 1374.

Although Gao Qi's models encompassed the entire previous poetic tradition, his contemporaries perceived him as having a preference for poetry from the Jian'an era (196–219) to the beginning of the Tang dynasty. This preference for archaic poetry was a precursor to the trend that characterized much of Ming poetry. The first Ming emperor's reign saw the execution or suicide of an entire generation of poets, resulting in a void in the poetic landscape at the end of the 14th century. This void persisted throughout much of the 15th century and also affected other fields such as Confucian thought, painting, and publishing. Despite this, Gao Bing (1350–1423) edited an important anthology of Tang poetry, the Tangshi pinhui (Graded Compendiumlm of Tang Poetry) . This anthology classified 5,769 poems by 620 Tang poets into four periods: "early" (7th century), "high" (8th century), "middle" (mid-9th century), and "late" (end of the 9th century). This periodization is still used today.

During the reigns of the Yongle, Hongxi, and Xuande emperors, the most esteemed poets were officials and members of the Hanlin Academy or the ministries. Their poetry was known as the "cabinet style" (taige ti), and like court theatre, it celebrated the emperor and Confucianism. Unlike the dazzling arias of the theatre, the style of these poets was not particularly impressive. The most notable poets of this genre were the "Three Yangs" (without family ties): Yang Shiqi (1365–1444), Yang Rong (1371–1440), and Yang Pu (1372–1446). Additionally, the fu genre was revived to honor Beijing, which had regained its status as the capital in 1420, similar to certain fu works from the Han dynasty. Scholars soon recognized the limitations of this style and began to expand their modes of expression. For example, Wang Ao (1450–1524), a member of the Hanlin Academy, retired to Suzhou and praised the beauty of his retreat in his poetry, inspired by the works of Tao Yuanming (4th century). The main proponent of the revitalization of the cabinet style (in poetry and essays) through admiration for writers of previous dynasties was Li Dongyang, a high-ranking official and arbiter of literary elegance during his time.

In the 1500s, a group known as the "Earlier Seven Masters" emerged, led by Li Mengyang, who championed the fugu movement. Their main goal was to revitalize poetry by placing a strong emphasis on emotion (qing), drawing inspiration from the poetry of the Tang dynasty. They were influenced by the philosopher Wang Yangming, who believed in innate moral knowledge and was also a respected poet of his time. This focus on emotion led them to value the spontaneity found in popular songs. The Earlier Seven Masters had differing views on poetry. For example, Li Mengyang and He Jingming held opposing views on the concept of fa ("law, rules"). He believed that rules were like a raft that could be discarded once the river was crossed, while Li saw them as a framework that should not be surpassed by the individuality of the poet. In the 1550s, the movement continued with the "Latter Seven Masters", which included Li Panlong, Wang Shizhen, Xie Zhen (1495–1575), and Zong Chen (1525–1560).

The Suzhou poetic school has a limited influence, with its main representatives Shen Zhou, Zhu Yunming, Wen Zhengming, and Tang Yin being known primarily as painters or calligraphers. However, it played a significant role in the renaissance of Suzhou as a major cultural center. Like the previous Seven Masters, the Suzhou school aimed to restore poetry to its lyrical character and saw itself as the successor to the poetry of Gao Qi. Wen Zhengming, who had a studio in the Humble Administrator's Garden, was renowned for his poems about the garden and for his two albums that combined painting, poetry, and calligraphy. Tang Yin, on the other hand, was known for his paintings of female figures and the poems he wrote about them, making him a representative of the femininity in Suzhou culture. Before Tang Yin, several poetesses gained recognition in Suzhou, including Meng Shuqing (孟淑卿; fl. 1476).
