= Earlier Seven Masters =

The Earlier Seven Masters (Note: Chinese: 前七子; pinyin: Qián Qīzǐ) were a group of seven influential poets and writers who were active during the first half of the 16th century in Ming China, under the rule of the Jiajing Emperor.

The Earlier Seven Masters were:

- Li Mengyang (1475–1529);
- He Jingming (1483–1521);
- Bian Gong (1476–1532);
- Wang Tingxiang (1474–1544);
- Kang Hai (1475–1540);
- Wang Jiusi (1468–1551);
- Xu Zhenqing (1479–1511).

The Seven Masters, along with the broader fugu (复古; 'revive antiquity') movement, were known for their admiration of archaic styles and their rejection of the clichés of the dominant secretariat style (taige ti). They also rejected the artificial and verbose parallelism of their predecessors. Their belief was that poetry should convey emotion, but they felt that the poems of their predecessors lacked sufficient expression. In their search for inspiration, they turned to the poets of the high Tang period, such as Du Fu, as well as older models like the Book of Songs and the Han, Wei, and Jin poets. They also showed a strong interest in folk songs. In terms of prose, they emulated the simple style of Han and Qin authors. In philosophy, they were influenced by Wang Yangming's school of heart/mind, rather than the officially promoted Zhuist orthodoxy.

Some scholars, including Xue Hui and Yang Shen, as well as the Eight Talents of the Jiajing era, believed that their principles were overly limiting and resulted in mere imitation rather than original creation. Despite this criticism, their influence, along with that of the Latter Seven Masters who emerged after the mid-16th century, greatly impacted the poets of Ming China, making their poetic style the most popular for many decades.
