= He Jingming =

Chinese poet (1483–1521)

- 何景明
- Born: 1483; Xinyang, Henan
- Died: 1521 (aged 37–38); Xinyang, Henan
- Education: jinshi degree (1502)

Chinese name
- Chinese: 何景明
Transcriptions
Standard Mandarin
- Hanyu Pinyin: Hé Jǐngmíng

He Jingming (Note: He Jingming used the courtesy name Zhongmo (仲默) and the art names Baipo (白坡) and Dafu shanren (大復山人).) (1483–1521) was a Chinese poet and writer active during the Ming dynasty. He was one of the "Earlier Seven Masters of the Ming" and a leading representative of Ming culture in his generation.

== Biography ==
He Jingming was born in 1483 in Xinyang, located in the southern part of Henan Province. His family were small landowners or peasants, with the exception of his grandfather He Qian, who held a lower official position as a supervisor of trade and crafts. His father, He Xin, also held a low position in the local administration. He Jingming received an education in Confucian teachings and applied for the civil service examinations. In 1498, at the young age of 15, he passed the provincial examinations and was ranked as the third best candidate. (Note: He Jingming later remembered that in his province, there were nearly ten thousand students, but only about a thousand of them were qualified to take the provincial examinations, and out of those, only eighty were able to pass. The competition in the capital was equally intense, with only one in ten candidates succeeding, often after multiple attempts.) He failed the metropolitan examination in Beijing on his first attempt in 1499. Three years later, he succeeded in the following examinations and passed the highest level, the palace examination, earning the title of jinshi. (Note: Among the successful candidates in 1502, He Jingming's friends included fellow Henan natives such as the philosophers Wang Tingxiang (1474-1544) and He Tang (1474-1543), the poet Wang Shangqiong (1478-1541), and Kang Hai, who ranked first in the examinations.) After completing his examinations, he returned home and did not receive his first official assignment until 1504. At this time, he was appointed as a drafter in the Central Drafting Office (zhongshu sheren, 中書舍人), where he prepared documents for the grand secretaries.

He was a critic of the policies of eunuch Liu Jin and was temporarily removed from office. After Liu's downfall in 1510, he was able to return to his position on the recommendation of Grand Secretary and renowned literary critic Li Dongyang. He also spoke out in support of the famous poet Li Mengyang after his arrest. Eventually, he was transferred from Beijing to the position of education intendant in Shaanxi Province. In 1521, due to illness, he resigned from his position and returned home, where he died soon after.

He Jingming was recognized as a talented poet by the literary circles of the capital soon after passing the examinations, if not before. He is considered one of the Earlier Seven Masters of the Ming, with Li Mengyang as the leading figure. He held a slightly different position in the poetic trends of the time. While he saw value in Li's imitation of past masters, he also believed it to be too restrictive for his own work and preferred to express himself through individual poetic expression.
