= Gong'an school =

The Gong'an school (Note: Chinese: 公安派; pinyin: Gōng'ān pài) was a Chinese literary group that emerged at the turn of the 16th and 17th centuries around the brothers Yuan Hongdao, Yuan Zongdao, and Yuan Zhongdao.

Yuan Hongdao, Yuan Zongdao, and Yuan Zhongdao, and the writers who shared their views are collectively known as the "Gong'an school", named after their birthplace, Gong'an County in Huguang. In their theoretical essays on literature, the Yuan brothers rejected blind adherence to past authorities and the imitation of earlier works, which they believed stifled creativity. While they acknowledged the importance of studying the masters of previous centuries, they emphasized the expression of one’s natural feelings, individuality, and spontaneity—an outlook heavily influenced by the philosopher Li Zhi. The poetry of the Yuan brothers was generally conventional, as they drew upon middle Tang poetry (particularly that of Bai Juyi) and Song poetry (notably Su Shi), rather than the High Tang style favored by earlier generations such as the Earlier Seven Masters and the Latter Seven Masters of the Ming. This approach was also adopted by Wang Shizhen, who likewise took poets of the middle Tang and Song as his models. Although the Yuan brothers’ poetry was less influential than their literary criticism, their ideas gained widespread recognition in the first half of the seventeenth century, influencing poets such as Zhong Xing and Qian Qianyi. Their views also foreshadowed the hedonistic attitudes of the later Ming literary generation that followed them.

The Yuan brothers were known for their refined and widespread views, which they shared through the establishment and support of literary societies, a common practice among their literary peers. They blended elements of Confucianism, Buddhism, and Taoism, and delved into a diverse range of subjects such as flower arranging and the study of medicinal plants. They also recognized the value of drama and fiction as legitimate forms of literature. Yuan Hongdao, in particular, championed the use of colloquial language in literature, arguing that it too had the ability to convey moral truths. He did not place it on the same level as classical literature in terms of aesthetic value. The Yuan brothers' literary circle extended beyond the educated gentry and included professionals such as painters, writers, and calligraphers, as well as merchants, women with a passion for literature, and even courtesans. This diverse cultural scene would go on to play a significant role in shaping Ming literature in the following generation.
