= Chang Lun =

- 常倫
- Born: November 30, 1492; Qinshui County, Zhezhou Prefecture, Shanxi
- Died: 1525; Shanxi
- Occupation(s): Official, calligrapher, painter, poet

Chinese name
- Traditional Chinese: 常倫
- Simplified Chinese: 常伦
Transcriptions
Standard Mandarin
- Hanyu Pinyin: Cháng Lún
- Wade–Giles: Ch'ang² Lun²

Courtesy name
- Chinese: 明卿
Transcriptions
Standard Mandarin
- Hanyu Pinyin: Míng Qīng
- Wade–Giles: Ming² Ch'ing¹

Art name
- Traditional Chinese: 樓居子
- Simplified Chinese: 楼居子
Transcriptions
Standard Mandarin
- Hanyu Pinyin: Lóu Jūzi
- Wade–Giles: Lou² Chü¹-tzu

Chang Lun (常倫; 1492–1525) was an official, poet, painter, and calligrapher of the Ming Dynasty.

Born in Qinshui County, Zhezhou Prefecture, Shanxi, he was the son of Chang Ci and grandnephew of Chang Yue, both Ming officials. A talented child, his poems and essays were praised by authors Li Mengyang and He Jingming. In 1510, when he was 18, he passed the provincial examination, earning second place. The following year, he passed the jìnshì examination, the highest and most difficult of the imperial examinations. He was appointed a judge in the Grand Court of Revision (大理寺丞).

Chang Lun led a bold personal life. He competed in archery with nobility at the capital. He loved to share wine, compose lyric poetry, and sing with girls of the gay quarters, spending time with ten a night. Once, upon being scolded for being late to his office, he said "Even before receiving my official appointment, I slept with orchids (胡姬). Why should I cease my enjoyment now?" In 1515, after offending certain officials at a banquet speech, he was demoted to a provincial-level position.

When the Jiajing Emperor (Zhu Houcong) took power in 1521, Chang Lun was promoted to assistant magistrate of Shuozhou. There he earned a good reputation by defending the region from bandits. In 1524, when an inspecting censor treated him discourteously, an offended Chang Lung left his office to return home. He was soon offered a promotion, but declined.

Chang Lun met an untimely death at only 33 years old while traveling in Shanxi. His friends, along with Shanxi officials Han Bangqi and Wang Zuo (王奏) arranged for his funeral. After Chang Lun's death, two anthologies of his works were published.
