= Wang Tingxiang =

Chinese official and philosopher (1474–1544)

- 王廷相

Censor-in-Chief
- In office 1533–1541 Serving with Mao Bowen (1537–1538 and from 1539) and Wang Yaofeng (1538)
- Monarch: Jiajing
- Preceded by: Nie Xian
- Succeeded by: Mao Bowen

Personal details
- Born: 4 December 1474
- Died: 23 September 1544 (aged 69)
- Education: jinshi degree (1502)

Philosophical work
- Notable works: Shenyan (Well-Weighed Words)
- Notable ideas: In his interpretation of Confucian philosophy, he emphasized the importance of qi (vital energy), which he regarded as the primary source and origin of the universe

Wang Tingxiang
- Chinese: 王廷相
Transcriptions
Standard Mandarin
- Hanyu Pinyin: Wáng Tíngxiàng

Wang Tingxiang (Note: Wang Tingxiang used the courtesy names Ziheng (子衡) and Bingheng (秉衡) and the art name Junchuan (浚川).) (4 December 1474 – 23 September 1544) was a Chinese scholar-official, Confucian philosopher, and writer during the Ming dynasty. He is associated with a strand of Ming thought that challenged both orthodox Zhu Xi's Neo-Confucianism and the idealism of Wang Yangming, emphasising the primacy of qi in explaining the nature of reality. In addition to his philosophical writings, he held several high-ranking government posts and participated in influential literary circles of his time.

== Biography ==
Wang Tingxiang was from Yifeng (儀封) in Henan Province, located in northern China (present-day Lankao County, Kaifeng). His family did not belong to the local elite. Wang's father was originally from Shaanxi Province and was sent to Henan as a form of punishment for his military service. In Yifeng, however, he was able to acquire tax-exempt land and eventually became quite wealthy. In his youth, Wang studied Confucianism and applied for the civil service examinations. He successfully passed the provincial examinations in 1495 and, after an unsuccessful attempt in 1496, he passed the metropolitan and palace examinations in 1502, earning the title of jinshi. This allowed him to embark on a career in civil service.

He initially worked at the Hanlin Academy before becoming secretary of the Office of Supervision of the Ministry of War in 1504. While in Beijing, he joined the literary circles surrounding Li Mengyang, He Jingming, and others, who were collectively known as the Earlier Seven Masters. This group aimed to elevate the standard of poetry by drawing inspiration from classical works and criticizing the work of older contemporaries, including their superiors such as Grand Secretary Li Dongyang, for being weak and lacking expression. Despite this, Wang maintained good relationships with later grand secretaries and held the literary style of Xia Yan in high regard. In addition to his contributions to literature, he also wrote about philosophy, ceremonies, and music.

He remained in Beijing until 1508, when he fell out with the faction around the eunuch Liu Jin and lost his post. After Liu's fall, he returned to the service and held various provincial posts. In the mid-1520s, he sided with the Jiajing Emperor in the Great Rites Controversy. His loyalty (Note: However, loyalty to the Emperor did not mean automatic compliance. Wang Tingxiang sometimes disagreed with the Emperor's proposals—for example, in 1533, he opposed the Emperor's planned journey to the south—but once the decision had been made, he worked to ensure its successful execution.) was rewarded by the Emperor with high government posts in the 1530s, including vice minister of war, minister of war in Nanjing, and censor-in-chief.

In 1541, Wang lost the imperial favor. This was due to a series of events, starting with a fire at the Imperial Ancestral Temple. The fire was seen as a warning from Heaven, and an investigation was launched to find the person responsible. Wang, who was censor-in-chief, was reprimanded for not reporting the wrongdoing of one of the officials. Shortly after, Duke Guo Xun (1475–1542) was accused of disrespecting the Emperor, and Wang, as his ally, was stripped of his positions and demoted to a commoner. He died three years later. After the death of the Jiajing Emperor, Wang's punishment was revoked as part of a general rehabilitation of officials who had been affected during the previous reign. In recognition of his contributions to the state, he was even given the posthumous name Sumin, meaning "Respectful and Conscientious".

== Philosophical thought and works ==
As a philosopher, he rejected Wang Yangming's teachings, but he also opposed Zhu Xi's orthodoxy. He disagreed with the prioritization of the principle of li and instead turned to the concept of qi in his search for the underlying unity of all things. This was influenced by the thoughts of Zhang Zai of the Song dynasty and Xue Xuan of the Ming. He believed that the universe and all its components originated from the primordial qi (yuanqi), which differed from Zhu's belief that the primordial principle was li and qi was simply a material manifestation of li.

Wang's ideas were further developed by his contemporary, Luo Qinshun. Both thinkers aimed to construct a philosophy that was less moralizing and more empirical, a trend that would later dominate Chinese Confucian thought during the early Qing period.

Wang's most significant work was Shenyan (慎言; 'Well-Weighed Words'). His shorter writings, including correspondence and responses to friends, are collected in Wang Tingxiang ji (王廷相集; 'Collected Works of Wang Tingxiang').
