= Ou (surname) =

Ou is the pinyin romanization of the Chinese surnames 區 and 歐, which share a common origin with the compound surname Ouyang (歐陽), from the ruling family of the State of Yue during the Spring and Autumn period. They are commonly romanized as Au or Ao in Cantonese.

Ou 歐 is listed 361st in the Song dynasty classic text Hundred Family Surnames. As of 2008, Ou 欧 is the 134th most common surname in China, shared by 1.13 million people.

Most recently, by using the 2010 China census data and statistical analysis data that included random sampling from Taiwan, Hong Kong and Macau, the Fuxi Culture Research Association ranked the surname 区/區 291st most common in China, shared by around 199,000 people (0.015% of the Chinese population) with the largest concentration of holders in Guangdong province.

== Distribution ==
Ou was the 27,293th most common surname in the United States during the 1990 census and the 11,845th most common surname during the 2000 census. Au ranked 11,417th and 5,195th, and Ao ranked 88,459th and 58,402nd.

During the 2010 census, Ou, Au and Ao ranked as the 7,891st, 4,919th and 41,501st most common surname respectively.

== Origins ==
The Ou (歐) and Ouyang are considered to both descend from the ruling family of the state of Yue during the Spring and Autumn period. With the 區 variant being descendants of Ou An (歐安), a wealthy and charitable merchant who came to the attention of Emperor Jing of Han, who ordered that Ou An do without the radical 'qian' (欠) from 歐, a character that means 'to owe'.

Many Ou have their ancestral roots in the Longgang, Zhongshan, Shunde, Panyu, and Xinhui areas of Guangdong.

== List of people with the surname ==
=== Ao (區) ===
- 區志雄 Ao Chi Hong, Macanese auto racing driver

=== Au (區) ===
- 區瑞強 Albert Au Shui Keung, Hong Kong DJ and folk singer
- 區偉鵬 Alex Au Waipang, Singaporean LGBT activist
- 區文詩 Angela Au Man Sze, Hong Kong DJ and member of Cookies
- 區錦新 Au Kam San, Macanese legislator
- 區雪兒 Susie Au Suet Yee, Hong Kong music-video director
- 區德 Au Tak or Au Chak-mun (1840–1920), Hong Kong developer, namesake of Kai Tak Airport and Munsang College
- 區丁平 Tony Au Ting-Ping, Hong Kong film and art director
- 區鳳墀 Au Fung-Chi, early Protestant leader in Hong Kong, gave name to Sun Yat-sen
- 區諾軒 Au Nok-hin, Hong Kong politician
- 區燕青 Alice Au Yin-ching, Hong Kong actress
- 區志偉 Au Chi-wai, Hong Kong snooker and pool player
- 區慶祥 Thomas Au Hing-cheung, Justice of Appeal of the Court of Appeal of Hong Kong
- 區嘉宏 Au Ka-wang, Director of Immigration of Hong Kong
- 區凱琳 Au Hoi Lam, Hong Kong artist
- 區嘉雯 Patra Au Ga Man, Hong Kong actress
- 區澤光 Chak Kwong Au, Canadian politician
- 區天駿 Antares Au, (born 1979) Hong Kong racing driver
- 區焯文 Au Cheuk-man, Hong Kong film director, screenwriter, and actor

=== Aw (區) ===
- 區德文 Aw Teck Boon, Singaporean gang lord and murder victim

=== Ow (區) ===
- 區耀漢 Ow Yao Han, Malaysian badminton player

=== Ou (區) ===
- 區楚良 Ou Chuliang, member of Chinese national soccer team
- 區適子 Ou Shizi (1234–1324), Song-era author of the Three Character Classic
- 區星 Ou Xing, Han-era bandit and rebel leader
- 區曼玲 Ou Manling, Taiwanese author

=== Ao (歐) ===
- 歐文龍 Ao Man Long, disgraced Macanese Secretary for Transport and Public Works

=== Au (歐) ===
- 歐倩怡 Cindy Au Sin Yee, Hong Kong TV actress
- 歐健兒 Au Kin-Yee, Hong Kong scriptwriter
- 歐丁玉 Michael Au Ding Yuk, Hong Kong music producer
- 歐錦棠 Stephen Au Kam Tong, Hong Kong TV actor
- 歐偉倫 Au Wai Lun, Hong Kong soccer player
- 歐詠芝 Annie Au Wing Chi, Hong Kong squash player
- 歐鎧淳 Stephanie Au Hoi-Shun, Hong Kong swimmer
- 歐鎮銘 Leo Au Chun Ming, Hong Kong squash player
- 歐菁仙 Sharon Au, Singaporean actress
- 歐曉瑜 Michelle Au, American anesthesiologist and politician
- 歐豪年 Au Ho-nien, Chinese painter

=== Aw (歐) ===
- 歐萱 / 歐燕苹 Jeanette Aw Ee-Ping, Singaporean actress
- 歐大旭 Tash Aw Ta-Shii, Malaysian expatriate, author of The Harmony Silk Factory

=== Ow (歐) ===
- 歐進福 Ow Chin Hock, Singaporean politician

=== Ou (歐) ===
- 歐大任 Ou Daren (1516–1596), one of the Latter Five Poets of the Southern Garden
- 歐定興 Edward Ou, Taiwanese TV actor
- 歐鴻鍊 Francisco Ou, former Minister of Foreign Affairs for the Republic of China
- 歐冶子 Ou Yezi, Spring and Autumn period master of sword-making from the state of Yue
- 歐震 Ou Zhen (1899–1969), World War II-era KMT general
- 歐泓奕 Howey Ou, Chinese environmental activist
- 歐鈺珊 Ou Yushan, Chinese artistic gymnast

=== Au (not classified) ===
- Au Yeong Wai Yhann, Singaporean squash player
- Allison Au, Canadian jazz saxophonist
- Carl Au, British actor, dancer, and singer
- Celia Au, Chinese American actress and filmmaker
- Elisa Au, American martial arts instructor
- Jessica Au, Australian writer
- Whitlow Au (1940–2020), Hawaiian bioacoustics specialist

== See also ==
- O, for some Korean and Japanese surnames occasionally romanized "Ou"
