= Liang Chu =

Chinese official (1451–1527)

- 梁儲

Senior Grand Secretary
- In office 1515–1517
- Monarch: Zhengde
- Preceded by: Yang Tinghe
- Succeeded by: Yang Tinghe

Grand Secretary
- In office 1510–1521
- Monarchs: Zhengde; Jiajing

Chancellor of the Hanlin Academy
- In office 1500–1509
- Monarch: Zhengde

Personal details
- Born: 8 August 1451
- Died: 25 April 1527 (aged 75)
- Education: jinshi degree (1478)

Chinese name
- Traditional Chinese: 梁儲
- Simplified Chinese: 梁储
Transcriptions
Standard Mandarin
- Hanyu Pinyin: Liáng Chǔ

Liang Chu (Note: Huo Tao used the courtesy name Shuhou (叔厚) and the art name Houzhai (厚齋).) (8 August 1451 – 25 April 1527) was a Chinese scholar-official during the Ming dynasty. In 1478, he passed the highest level of the imperial examination and obtained the jinshi degree. He subsequently served at the Hanlin Academy for two decades, becoming its chancellor in 1500. During the Zhengde Emperor's reign (1505–1521), he served as a grand secretary from 1510 to 1521 and headed the Grand Secretariat from 1515 to 1517.

== Early life ==
Liang Chu was born during China's Ming dynasty on 8 August 1451 in Shunde County, located near Guangzhou, the capital of Guangdong province in southern China. He studied Confucian teachings and was a disciple of the Confucian philosopher Chen Xianzhang (also known as Chen Baisha), who lived in neighboring Xinhui County. In 1474, he successfully passed the provincial civil service examinations. Four years later, he passed the metropolitan and palace examinations in the capital, Beijing, and obtained the jinshi degree. He distinguished himself by placing first in the metropolitan examinations and fourth in the palace examinations among the 350 successful candidates.

== Early career ==
After passing the examinations, Liang Chu was appointed to the Hanlin Academy as a bachelor (shujishi). Two years later, he was promoted to junior compiler (bianxiu). He served twice as a tutor to the heir apparent: from 1486 to 1487 to the future Hongzhi Emperor (r. 1487–1505), and from 1496 to 1505 to the future Zhengde Emperor (r. 1505–1521). He participated in the administration of the civil service examinations as an assistant chief examiner of the metropolitan examination in 1487. He was chief examiner of the Beijing provincial examinations in 1492 and 1501, the Nanjing provincial examination in 1498, and the metropolitan examinations in 1508 and 1514. In 1498, he was sent to Đại Việt (present-day northern Vietnam) to confirm the accession of the new Viet ruler, Lê Hiến Tông.

At the Hanlin Academy, Liang gradually rose through the ranks, serving as a lecturer (shidu) and Hanlin academician (xueshi), and headed the academy from 1500. At the same time, he served as administrator of the heir apparent's household and as vice minister of personnel from 1503 to 1506. From 1507 to 1509, he held the title of minister of personnel, with responsibility for drafting imperial proclamations and edicts. In 1509, he was removed from his position as head of the academy and transferred to Nanjing, where he became Nanjing minister of personnel.

== Grand Secretary ==
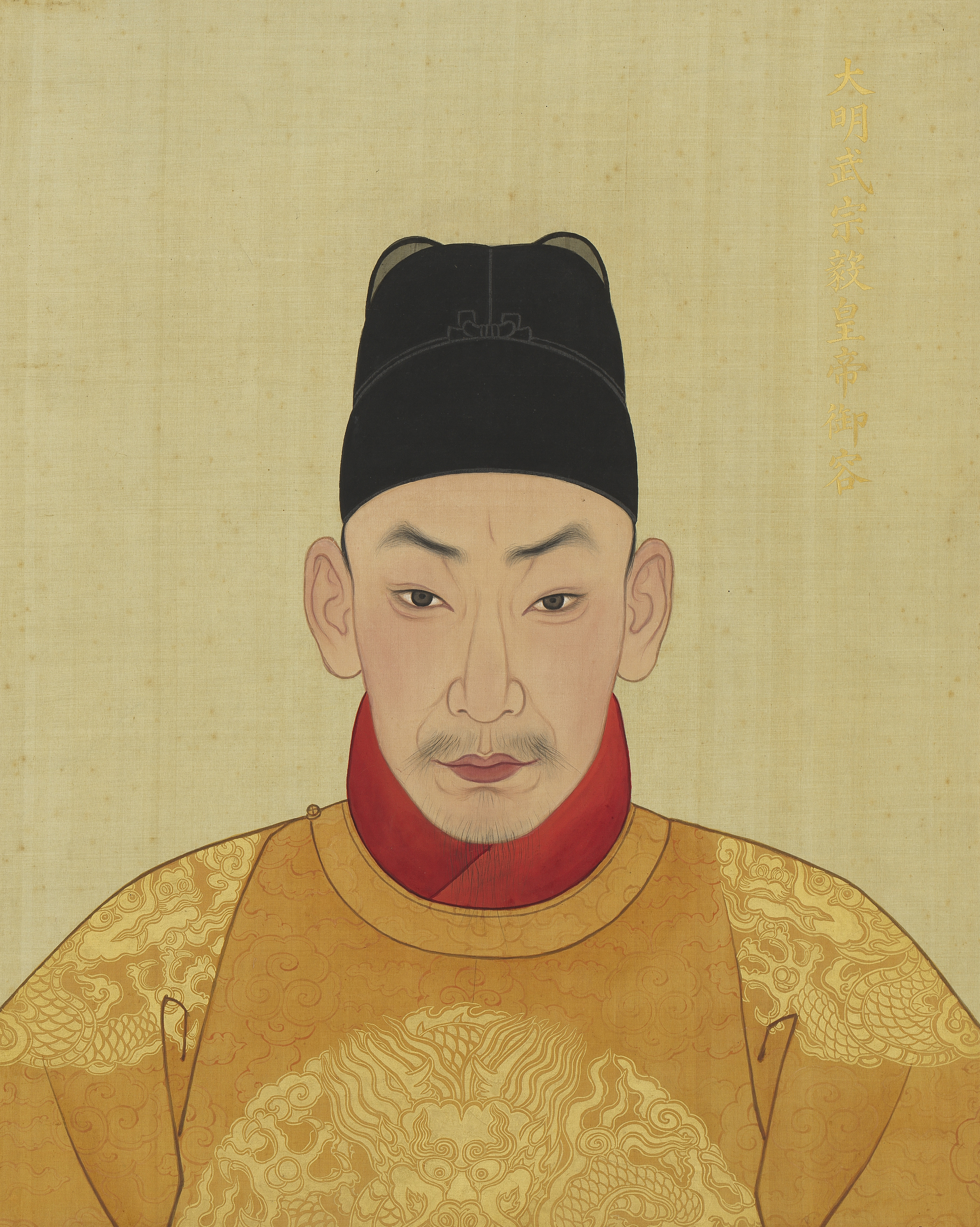
The Zhengde Emperor

During the early years of the Zhengde Emperor's reign, the powerful eunuch Liu Jin controlled the government. In 1510, Liu Jin was deposed and his ally, Grand Secretary Jiao Fang (焦芳), was dismissed. The Zhengde Emperor summoned Liang from Nanjing and appointed him grand secretary. He also granted Liang the titles of minister of personnel and junior preceptor.

Li Dongyang served as the head of the Grand Secretariat until his retirement in 1513, when Yang Tinghe succeeded him. Liang and Yang had both passed the metropolitan examination in 1478 and had served for many years at the Hanlin Academy. In April 1515, Yang resigned to mourn his deceased father, and Liang became head of the Grand Secretariat. He led the Grand Secretariat until December 1517, when Yang returned to office. Liang continued to serve as an ordinary grand secretary.

While Yang Tinghe was widely respected and popular as a statesman, Liang Chu was criticized for incompetence and nepotism. A major case cited by his critics was that of his eldest son, Liang Cishu (梁次攄), a captain in the Embroidered Uniform Guard. In 1514, Liang Cishu was accused of murdering a rival with whom he was competing to acquire a large tract of land in their home region. A subsequent investigation found that he had had more than 200 people from 30 families killed in connection with the case. With the other grand secretaries' support and the Emperor's leniency, Liang Chu managed to have the punishment for these crimes reduced to mere transfer to the frontier troops.

Politically, Liang largely shared the conservative outlook of Yang and two other grand secretaries, Jiang Mian (蔣冕) and Mao Ji (毛紀). Together, they opposed the Zhengde Emperor's approach to governance, for example protesting against his journeys to the northern frontier and his proposed journey to Nanjing. In August 1518, the grand secretaries jointly requested permission to resign in protest against the Emperor's intention to leave Beijing, but their request was rejected. The Secretariat's stance toward the Emperor remained unchanged during Yang's absence from 1515 to 1517, although Liang was not as powerful or charismatic a politician as Yang. Recognizing this, he repeatedly asked the Emperor to allow Yang to return to office early.

However, Liang was also a bitter rival of Yang. While Yang insisted on maintaining the ban on private foreign trade, Liang favored a more liberal policy and in 1517 approved a proposal by the Guangdong provincial authorities to legalize maritime foreign trade. In Guangdong, the provincial authorities had not prevented maritime trade conducted by foreign ships since the 1470s, taxing such trade at a rate of 30 percent from 1509. Yang and Minister of Rites Liu Chun (劉春) secured a ban on this practice in 1514, and reiterated it in 1515, but the Guangdong authorities ignored their orders. Personnel changes accompanied the changes in policy: after Liang Chu assumed leadership of the Grand Secretariat in 1515, several opponents of the legalization of foreign trade, including Liu Chun, were removed from office, while determined supporters of the opposite approach were appointed to leading positions in the Guangdong administration.

In 1518, the Zhengde Emperor decided to appoint himself field marshal, despite the protests of the grand secretaries. In the following year, he proceeded south to suppress the Prince of Ning's rebellion, overruling their objections even after receiving news that Wang Yangming, the governor of southern Jiangxi, had already defeated the rebels and captured the prince. Grand secretaries Liang and Jiang accompanied the Emperor as members of his entourage, while Yang and Mao remained in Beijing to oversee the government in the capital. In September 1520, Liang and Jiang knelt and wept for hours before the palace gate in Nanjing, pleading with the Emperor to return to Beijing rather than continue farther south.

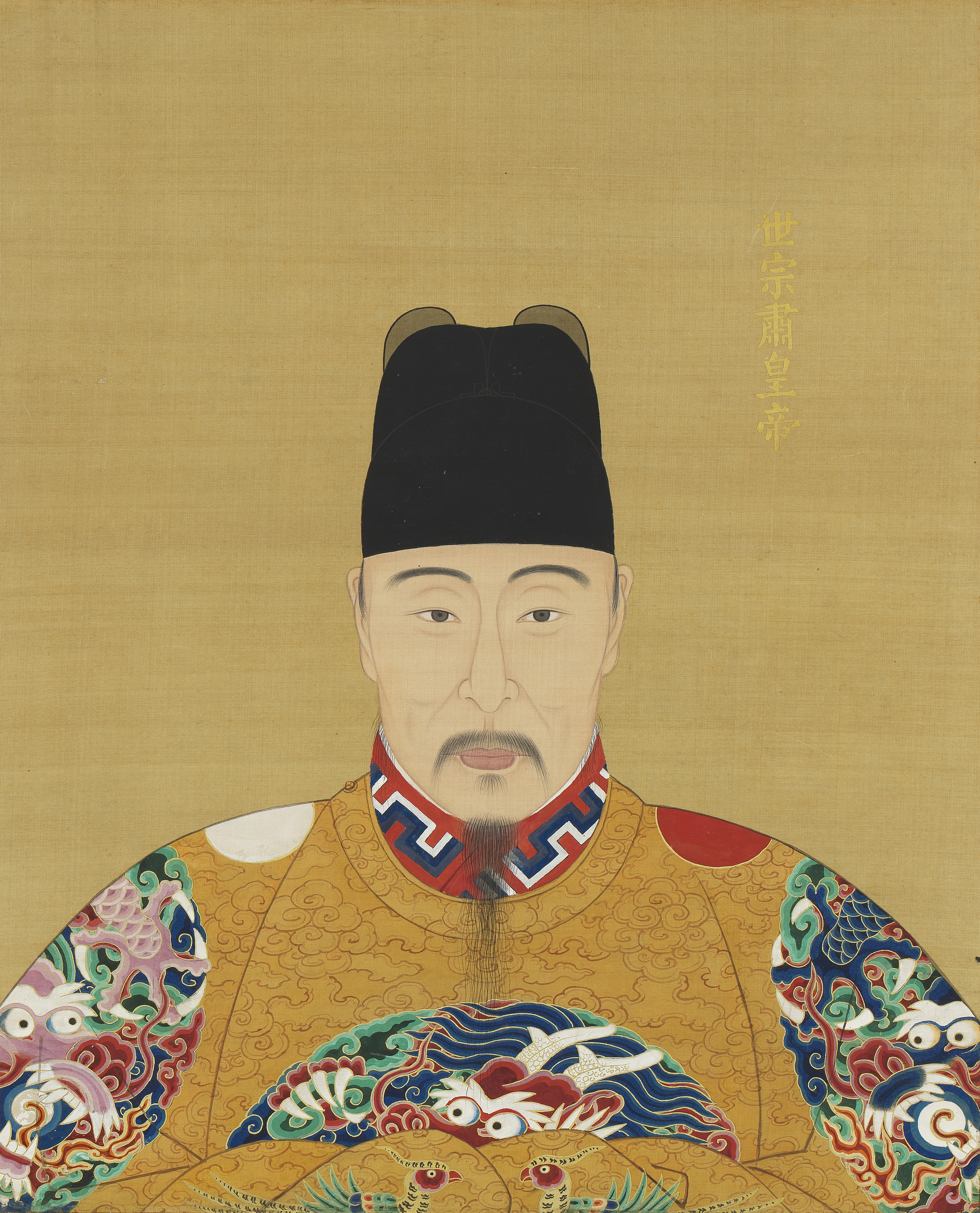
The Jiajing Emperor

In April 1521, the Zhengde Emperor died after falling ill following a boating accident while fishing in October 1520, on his return to the capital. Yang Tinghe selected Zhu Houcong, the Emperor's closest male relative, as his successor and gained the support of the other grand secretaries (including Liang), the leading imperial eunuchs, and Empress Dowager Zhang, the Emperor's mother. Yang, with the assistance of his colleagues, drafted two edicts: the Zhengde Emperor's will and a subsequent edict from the Empress Dowager. The Emperor's will designated Zhu Houcong as his successor, while the Empress Dowager's edict summoned Zhu Houcong to Beijing to ascend the throne. Liang was one of the senior officials in the delegation that subsequently travelled to Zhu Houcong's residence in Anlu, Huguang, central China, to invite him to ascend the throne. (Note: The delegation also included Xu Guangzuo (徐光祚), Duke of Ding; Zhang Heling (張鶴齡), Marquis of Shouning; Cui Yun (崔元), the commandant-escort; Mao Cheng (毛澄), Minister of Rites; and three senior eunuchs.) Zhu Houcong accepted the imperial title, travelled to Beijing, and formally ascended the throne as the Jiajing Emperor on 27 May 1521.

== Later life ==
A few days after the Jiajing Emperor's accession to the throne, a group of censors accused Liang of incompetence and poor personnel administration. During the ensuing debate, it was suggested that the confiscation of Liang's property would yield an amount equivalent to half of the state's annual revenue. The 70-year-old Liang responded to the accusations by requesting permission to resign from his offices, and the Emperor accepted his resignation. After leaving office, Liang returned to his native region, continued to enjoy the ruler's favor, and received honors for his past services. He died on 25 April 1527.

After Liang Chu's death, Vice Minister of Personnel Gui E, who was responsible for matters concerning posthumous honors and titles, argued that Liang did not deserve such honors. He based his view on a series of critical assessments of Liang's personal conduct and official career by censors. The Emperor, however, regarded Liang as an outstanding statesman and posthumously bestowed him the name Wenkang (文康) and the title of grand preceptor. Huo Tao, a high-ranking official who was close to the Emperor and had placed first in the 1514 metropolitan examination, over which Liang had presided and was therefore indebted to him, compiled a biography of Liang. In the biography, Huo portrayed Liang favorably, through manipulation and distortion of events and facts, as a selfless statesman who had shown no interest in accumulating either silver or land. He also proposed the promotion of Liang's son Liang Cishu.
