= 區 =

區 (or "区") refers to a district in East Asian countries, it may refer to:

- District (Taiwan)
- District (China)
- List of districts in South Korea
- List of second-level administrative divisions of North Korea
- Wards of Japan
- Ou (surname) (simplified Chinese: 区; traditional Chinese: 區), a Chinese surname
