= Ou Daren =

- Traditional Chinese: 歐大任
- Simplified Chinese: 欧大任
Transcriptions
Standard Mandarin
- Hanyu Pinyin: Ōu Dàrèn
Yue: Cantonese
- Jyutping: Au^{1} Daai^{6}-jam^{6}

Zhenbo (courtesy name)
- Traditional Chinese: 楨伯
- Simplified Chinese: 桢伯
Transcriptions
Standard Mandarin
- Hanyu Pinyin: Zhēnbó
Yue: Cantonese
- Jyutping: Zing^{1} Baak^{3}

Lunshan (art name)
- Traditional Chinese: 崙山
- Simplified Chinese: 仑山
Transcriptions
Standard Mandarin
- Hanyu Pinyin: Lúnshān
Yue: Cantonese
- Jyutping: Leon^{4} Saan^{1}

Ou Daren (1516–1596) was a Ming Dynasty scholar. He was a native of Chencun (陳村), Shunde in Guangdong province. Becoming an official with the Second-Degree Scholars (優貢), he was appointed at posts such as Assistant of the Imperial College (國子監助教), Officer in Ministry of Work Affairs in Nanjing (南京工部虞衡郎中), etc. He was famous for his poetry, and was one of "The Latter Five Poets of the Southern Garden" (南园后五子), along with Liang Youyu, Li Minbiao, Wu Dan and Li Shixing. His famous works are the Collected Works of Ou Yubu (歐虞部集) and the Biographies of Virtuous Ancestors of Bai Yue (百越先賢志).
