= Liu Tingji =

Qing scholar-official

Liu Tingji (simplified Chinese: 刘廷玑; traditional Chinese: 劉廷璣; pinyin: Liú Tíngjī; Wade–Giles: Liu T'ing-chi; 1653?–1716?) was a Chinese scholar-official and man of letters of the Qing dynasty.

== Life and work ==
His style name (zi) was Yuheng 玉衡, and his hao was Zaiyuan 在园. He belonged to the Han Banner. His ancestors had lived for generations in Kaifeng, Henan, later moved to Liaoyang, and were incorporated into the Han Banner. His grandfather served as Governor of Fujian, and his father at one time held the post of Prefect of Anhui. During the Kangxi reign, he entered official service.

His deeds are recorded in the Qinding baqi tongzhi 钦定八旗通志: Biographies of Benevolent officials 循吏传 (Part Four), volume 239. He founded some institutions of learning.

Liu Tingji was a prolific author. He is mostly known for his work Zaiyuan zazhi 在园杂志 / 在園雜志 (Zaiyuan’s Random Notes or Miscellaneous notes of Zaiyuan), in 4 juan. The work discusses dozens of novelistic works and deals, among other topics, with sequel novels (xushu 续书), the four masterworks of the Ming novel (Si da qishu 四大奇书, i.e. Shuihu zhuan 水浒传, Sanguo yanyi 三国演义, Jinpingmei 金瓶梅, and Xiyou ji 西游记, xiaoshuo of gifted scholars and beautiful ladies, as well as erotic novels. His analysis of theories of commentary and evaluation occupies a certain place in the history of the novel and of literary criticism. His assessments were cited by Lu Xun (1881–1936) and Sun Kaidi 孙楷第 (1898–1986). In his discussion of the practice of writing sequels to famous novels, he cites, among others, two sequels to the Xiyou ji. The Hanyu da zidian (HYDZD), for example, makes use of the Zaiyuan zazhi in the edition of the Shenbaoguan congshu (申报馆丛书余集).

Liu Tingji's poetry collection, Gezhuang fenlei shichao (葛庄分类诗钞), with selected poems classified by category, is spanning fourteen volumes. It was prefaced by Wang Shizhen, the foremost poet of his era. Likewise, his four-volume prose collection, Zaiyuan zazhi, featured a preface by the renowned playwright Kong Shangren. That such leading literary figures personally took up their pens to write introductions for him attests to the esteem in which he was held within the literary circles of his time.

== Bibliography ==
- Qinding baqi tongzhi 欽定八旗通志 (Siku quanshu edition 四庫全書本, juan 239)
