= Xu Zhongxing =

Xu Zhongxing (Chinese: 徐中行; 1517 – 1578) was a Chinese scholar-official of the Ming Dynasty. He was one of the Latter Seven Masters. He earned the Jinshi degree in 1550. Later he was appointed as Xingbu Zhushi (刑部主事), and became Buzhengshi (布政使) of Jiangxi.

Most of his poems portrayed the beautiful landscape and social customs of various places, and expressed his homesickness. Xu's poems were strongly influenced by Du Fu, but lack of profoundness and forcefulness.
