= The Latter Five Poets of the Southern Garden =

Ming dynasty poetry circle

The Latter Five Poets of the Southern Garden (simplified Chinese: 南园后五子; traditional Chinese: 南園后五子; pinyin: Nányuán Hòu Wǔ Zǐ) was a Ming dynasty poetry circle composed of Liang Youyu (梁有誉), Ou Daren (歐大任), Li Minbiao (黎民表), Wu Dan (吴旦), and Li Shixing (李时行). They are generally considered to be the most important Cantonese poets of the sixteenth century.

== See also ==
- The Latter Seven Masters
