= Yang Tinghe =

Ming dynasty official (1459–1529)

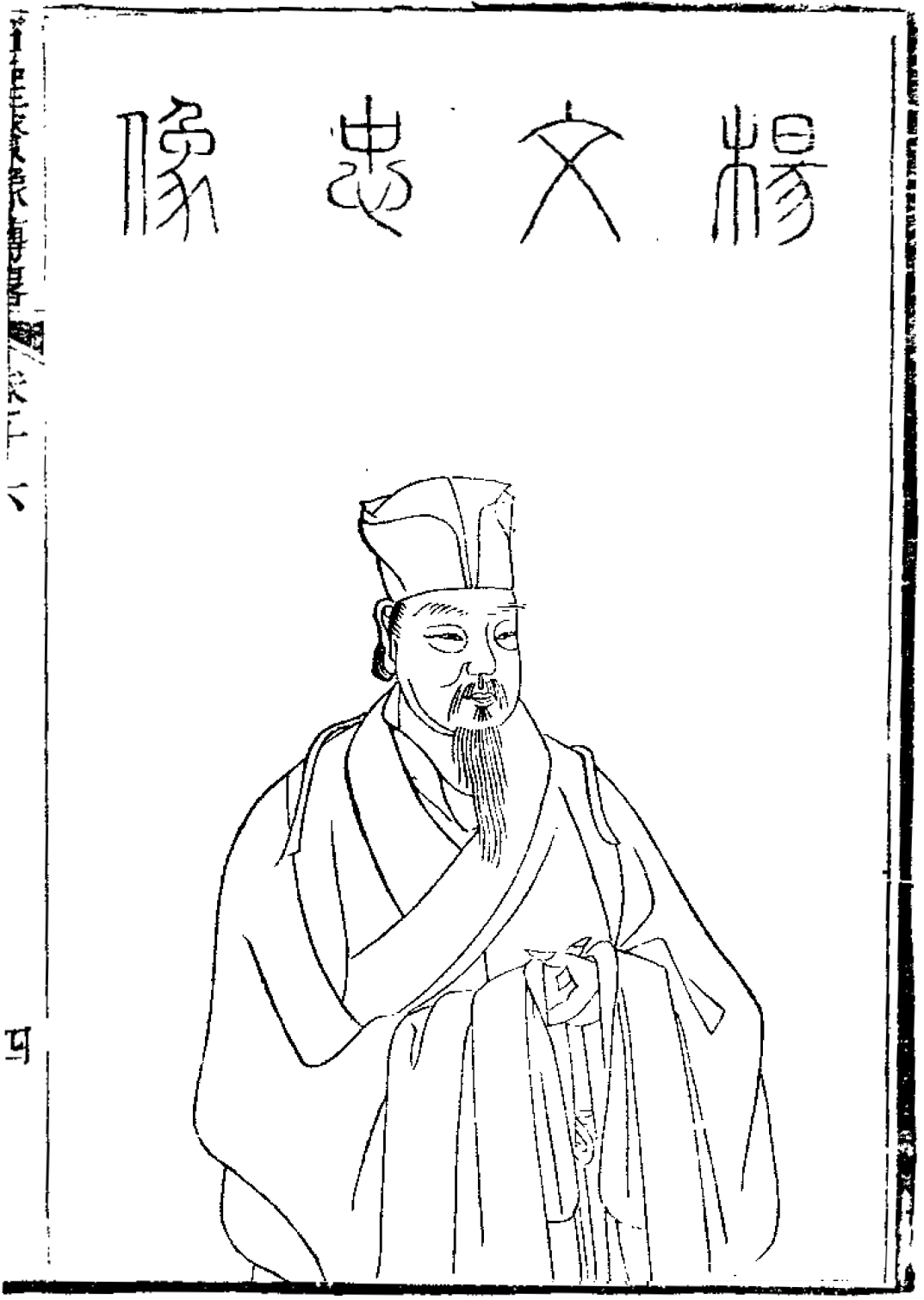

21st and 23rd Senior Grand Secretary
- In office 1512–1515
- Monarch: Zhengde Emperor
- Preceded by: Li Dongyang
- Succeeded by: Liang Chu
- In office 1517–1524
- Monarch: Jiajing Emperor
- Preceded by: Liang Chu
- Succeeded by: Jiang Mian

Minister of Revenue (Southern Capital)
- In office 1507
- Monarch: Zhengde Emperor
- Preceded by: Gao Quan
- Succeeded by: Zhang Jin

Personal details
- Born: 15 October 1459 Xindu, Chengdu, Ming China
- Died: 25 July 1529 (aged 69) Xindu, Chengdu, Ming China
- Relations: Yang Shen (son)

Yang Tinghe (Chinese: 楊廷和; 15 October 1459 – 25 July 1529), style name Jiefu, was a Grand Secretary in the Ming dynasty under the Zhengde and Jiajing emperors. Yang was born and died in Xindu, Sichuan province, China.

== Biography ==
Yang Tinghe earned the Jinshi degree in the imperial examination in 1478 at the age of 19.

After the death of the Zhengde Emperor in 1521, Yang became the de facto policymaker of the imperial government for 37 days. He conducted a series of reforms in these 37 days and abolished many unpopular legacies of the Zhengde Emperor, including the arrest of his favorite, general Jiang Bin. Yang played an important role in choosing the young Zhu Houcong (then Prince Xing and a cousin of the late Zhengde) as the next emperor.

After Zhu Houcong was brought to Beijing from his parents' estate in the Hubei countryside and enthroned as the Jiajing Emperor, Yang Tinghe tried to continue his influence in the court, given the young age of the new emperor. However, the Grand Secretary disagreed with the emperor as to whom the latter should venerate as his dead father. Yang Tinghe was forced to retire after his political failure during this so-called Great rites controversy in 1524.

== Family ==
The poets Yang Shen and Huang E were Yang Tinghe's son and daughter-in-law.

== See also ==
- List of premiers of China
- Grand Secretary
