= Li Panlong =

Chinese poet and literary theorist (1514–1570)

- 李攀龍
- Born: 1514; Licheng, Jinan Prefecture, Shandong
- Died: 1570 (aged 55–56); Licheng, Jinan Prefecture, Shandong
- Education: juren degree (1544)

Chinese name
- Traditional Chinese: 李攀龍
- Simplified Chinese: 李攀龙
Transcriptions
Standard Mandarin
- Hanyu Pinyin: Lǐ Pānlóng

Li Panlong (Note: Li Panlong used the courtesy name Yulin (于鱗) and the art name Cangming (滄溟).) (1514–1570) was a Chinese writer and literary theorist active during the Ming dynasty, a leading figure among the Latter Seven Masters, and one of the foremost figures of Ming cultural life.

== Biography ==
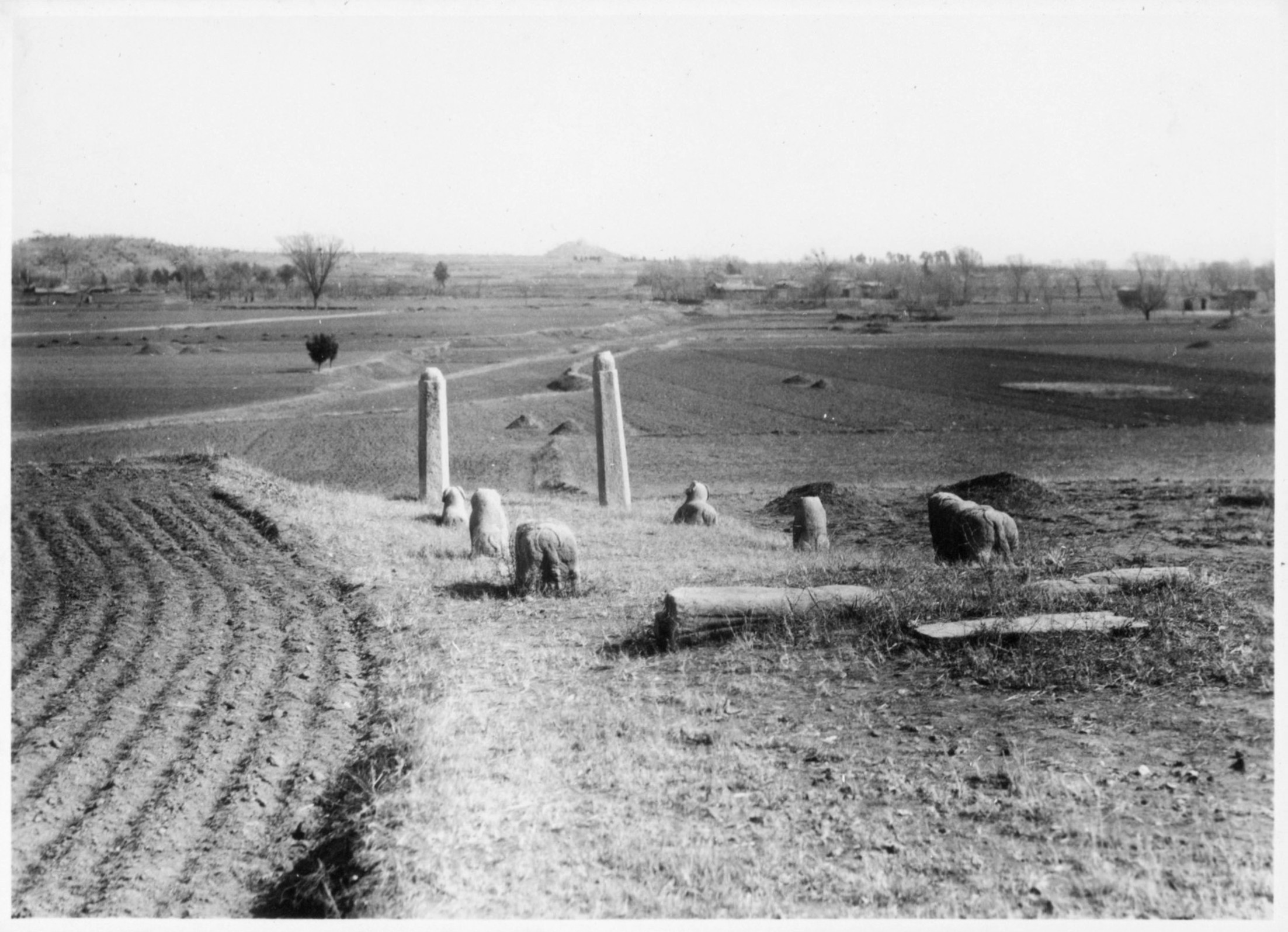
Tomb of Li Panlong

Li Panlong was born in 1514 in Licheng, Jinan, Shandong. He was a scholar of Confucianism and successfully passed the civil service examinations. In 1544, he achieved the highest level of the exams, known as the palace examination, and was awarded the title of jinshi. He then embarked on a career in civil service, serving in both Beijing and various regions. In 1557, he was dismissed and remained out of office for ten years before being reappointed.

In the late 1540s, he joined forces with the younger Wang Shizhen and formed a group of poets known as the Latter Seven Masters, with himself as the leading figure. As the leader of this group, he advocated for the archaizing literary movement, which held the belief that the best prose was written during the Han period (and earlier), and that the most esteemed poets were from the Tang dynasty's high period. He believed that writers should emulate the methods of these poets. The other members of the Latter Seven Masters and the entire archaising movement did not share his narrow focus on a single period or limited selection of models.

Li's poems, which imitated the compositions of late Tang writers, were not well received by his contemporaries who found them boring and unoriginal. He gained importance through his editorial work when he published the collections of Tang poetry, Gujin Shisan (古今詩刪; 'Correct Edition of Ancient and Modern Poetry') and Tangshi Xuan (唐詩選; 'Selection of Tang Poetry'). These collections established the high status of late Tang writers.
