= Xie Zhen (poet) =

Xie Zhen (谢榛, 1495–1575) was a Chinese poet of the Ming dynasty. When he was 15 years old, he learned to write poems after Su Donggao (苏东皋). At age 16, some yuefu poems he composed became very popular in Linqing, Deping and nearby. Most of his poems depicted the landscape of Yecheng, where he lived for many years. In 1548, Xia Yan and Zeng Xian were executed in a political struggle against Yan Song, and some of Xie's friends were banished from the court in the aftermath, Xie wrote many poems to console them. He was also associated with Prince Xuan of Shen, a literary patron and supporter of Taoism.

Xie was involved in the poetry circle "The Latter Seven Masters". Although he became established as a famous poet and critic, he was nevertheless held in low social standing due to having not passed any imperial examinations, let alone the rank of jinshi, nor did he ever hold office. Because of this, he was eventually edged out of the leadership of the Latter Seven Masters.
