= Liang Youyu =

Chinese writer (1521–1556)

- Traditional Chinese: 梁有譽
- Simplified Chinese: 梁有誉
Transcriptions
Standard Mandarin
- Hanyu Pinyin: Liáng Yǒuyù
Yue: Cantonese
- Jyutping: Loeng^{4} Jau^{5}-jyu^{6}

Gongshi (courtesy name)
- Traditional Chinese: 公實
- Simplified Chinese: 公实
Transcriptions
Standard Mandarin
- Hanyu Pinyin: Gōngshí
Yue: Cantonese
- Jyutping: Gung^{1}-sat^{6}

Lanting Jushi (art name)
- Traditional Chinese: 蘭汀居士
- Simplified Chinese: 兰汀居士
Transcriptions
Standard Mandarin
- Hanyu Pinyin: Lántīng Jūshì
Yue: Cantonese
- Jyutping: Laan^{4}-ting^{1} Geoi^{1}-si^{6}

Liang Youyu (1521–1556) was a Ming dynasty scholar. A native of Shunde (顺德) in Guangdong province, he completed the Jinshi (进士) level of the Imperial Examination in 1550. He was involved in two well known poetry circles "The Latter Five Poets of the Southern Garden" (南园后五子), and "The Seven Masters" (后七子). His most famous work is Lántīng Cúngǎo (兰汀存稿) (also known as Bǐbùjí 比部集).
