= Huang E =

Huang E (Chinese: 黄峨, also known as Huang Xiumei (黄秀眉); 1498–1569) was a Chinese poet of the Ming dynasty.

== Life and work ==
Her family's home was in Suining in Sichuan, but she often lived with her father, who was a high-ranking official of the Ming court. She was known to be intelligent and she got a good education by any standards. After returning to Sichuan when she was 21, she married Yang Shen, the son of Grand Secretary Yang Tinghe. Both spouses had great interest in literary activities.

Both Yang Shen and his father opposed the Jiajing Emperor and Yang Shen was beaten and then banished to Yunnan. She then went to the Yang's family's house in Chengdu, where she took care of financial matters as well as the education and upbringing of the children and grandchildren of the Yang family. They communicated with letters and sent each other poems, which Yang Shen showed to others and thereby became famous.

The two were briefly reunited in 1526 when Yang Shen was allowed to return to visit his dying father. Once his trip was finished, Huang E traveled with Yang Shen to Yunnan to help him and share his hardships. They returned to Sichuan in 1529 to attend Yang Tinghe's funeral. Afterwards, Huang E stayed to take care of the house as Yang Shen returned to Yunnan.

In 1559, tragedy fell as Yang Shen died at the age of 71 at the barracks where he had been exiled. Huang E traveled to Huzhou, Yunnan to take her husband's remains to their family tomb in Xingdu. It was said that the tragedy was too great for Huang E and she became ill as a result. She died in 1569.

Many poems have been written in her name in which she admonishes Yang Shen for his irresponsible behavior in Yunnan, though it is possible that he wrote some of those as a parody on himself.

Several of Huang E's works were collected into Selected Poems of the Wife of Zhangyuan Yang, Afterthought of Madame Yang's Silk Songs and Ballads, Yuefu of Madam Huang, Letters Between Husband and Wife, and Sanqu of Yang Shen and His Wife. In 1983 AD, there was a Huang E Memorial Hall built at Gui Lake in Xingdu where several of her objects were left to be exhibited.

== Sent to My Husband ==
An example of her poetry used to communicate with Yang Shen is Sent to My Husband:

"Wild geese have never flown as far as Hengyang";
How then will my embroidered words be carried all the way to Yongchang?
Like the willow's flowers by the end of spring, I am ill-fated indeed;
In the mists of that alien land, you feel the pangs of despair.
"Oh, to go home, to go home," you mourn to the year's bitter end.
"Oh, if it would rain, if it would rain," I complain to the bright dawn.
One hears of vain promises that you could be set free;
When will the Golden Cock reach all the way to Yelang?

== Sources ==
- Kang-i Sun Chang; Haun Saussy; Charles Yim-tze Kwong (1999). Women writers of traditional China: an anthology of poetry and criticism. Stanford University Press.
- Barbara Bennett Peterson; He Hong Fei; Wang Jiyu; Han Tie; Zhang Guangyu (2000). Notable Women of China: Shang Dynasty to the Early Twentieth Century. M. E. Sharpe.
