= Zong Chen =

Chinese Scholar, Ming Dynasty

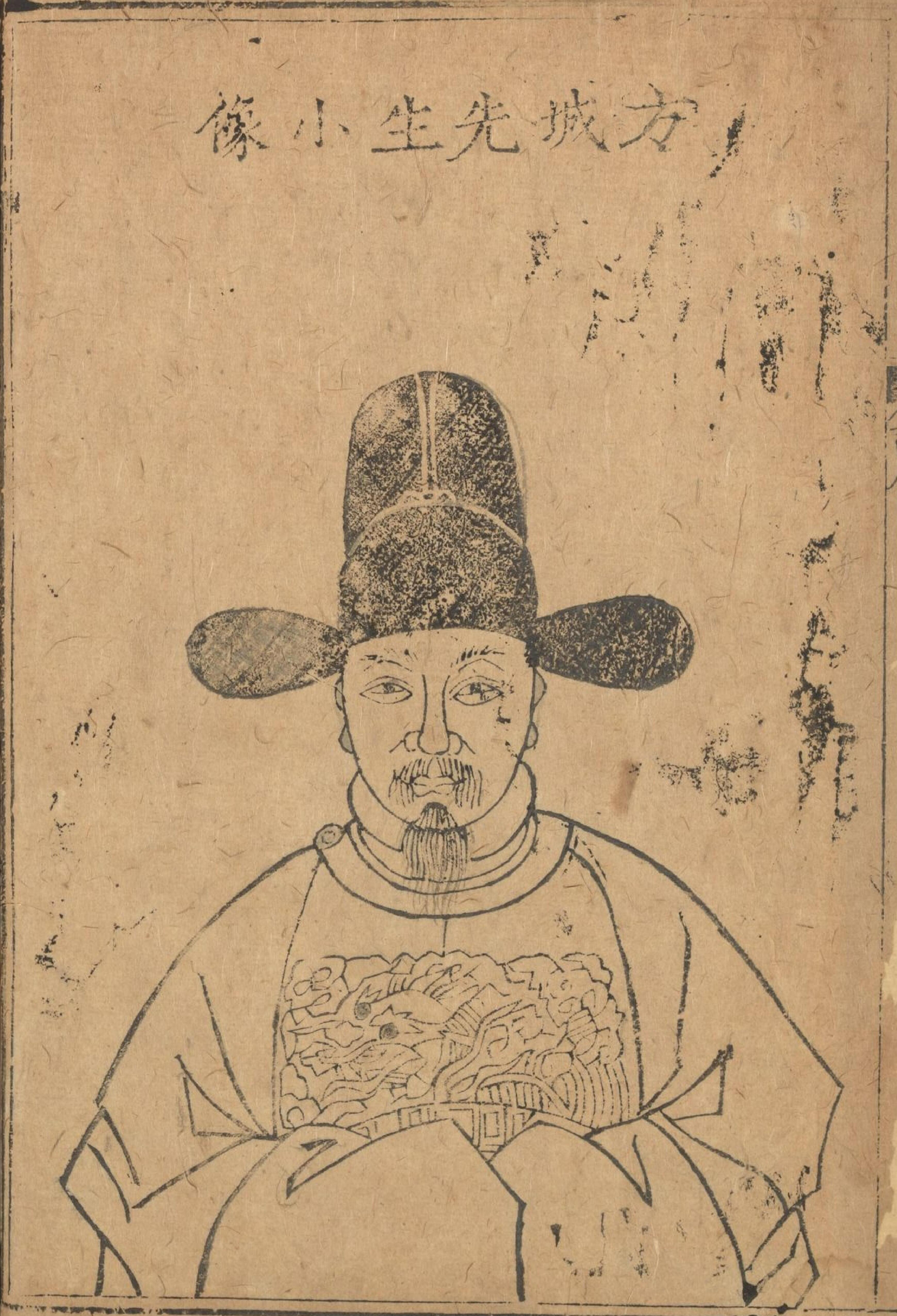
Zong Chen

Zong Chen (Chinese:宗臣, Zōng Chén;1525–1560) was a major Chinese scholar-official of the Ming Dynasty.

== Name variations ==
Zong (宗) is his family name, or surname. His given name is Chen (臣). His courtesy name was Zǐ Xiàng (子相). He may also be known by the pseudonym (hao), fāng Chéng Shān Rén (方城山人).

== Life ==
The book, The Record of Xing Hua (兴化市志) remains the primary source of bibliographical material on Zong Chen. More sources include internal evidence from articles by or about Zong Chen, and other sources.

In 1525, Zong Chen was born in Xinghua (兴化). Disappointed with the corruption of the imperial government, Zong Chen resigned and went back to Xing hua in the year of 1552. He then spent considerable time on reading and writing. In 1560, Zong Chen died at the age of 36.

== Works ==
Zong Chen was a member of The Latter Seven Masters. At first, when began writing poems, he imitated the style of Li Bai, but failed. His main works include Letter To Liu Yizhang (报刘一丈书) and many poems.

== Influence ==
Zong Chen's moral as well as his articles have had an important influence on the Chinese culture.
