= Yang Shen =

Chinese poet

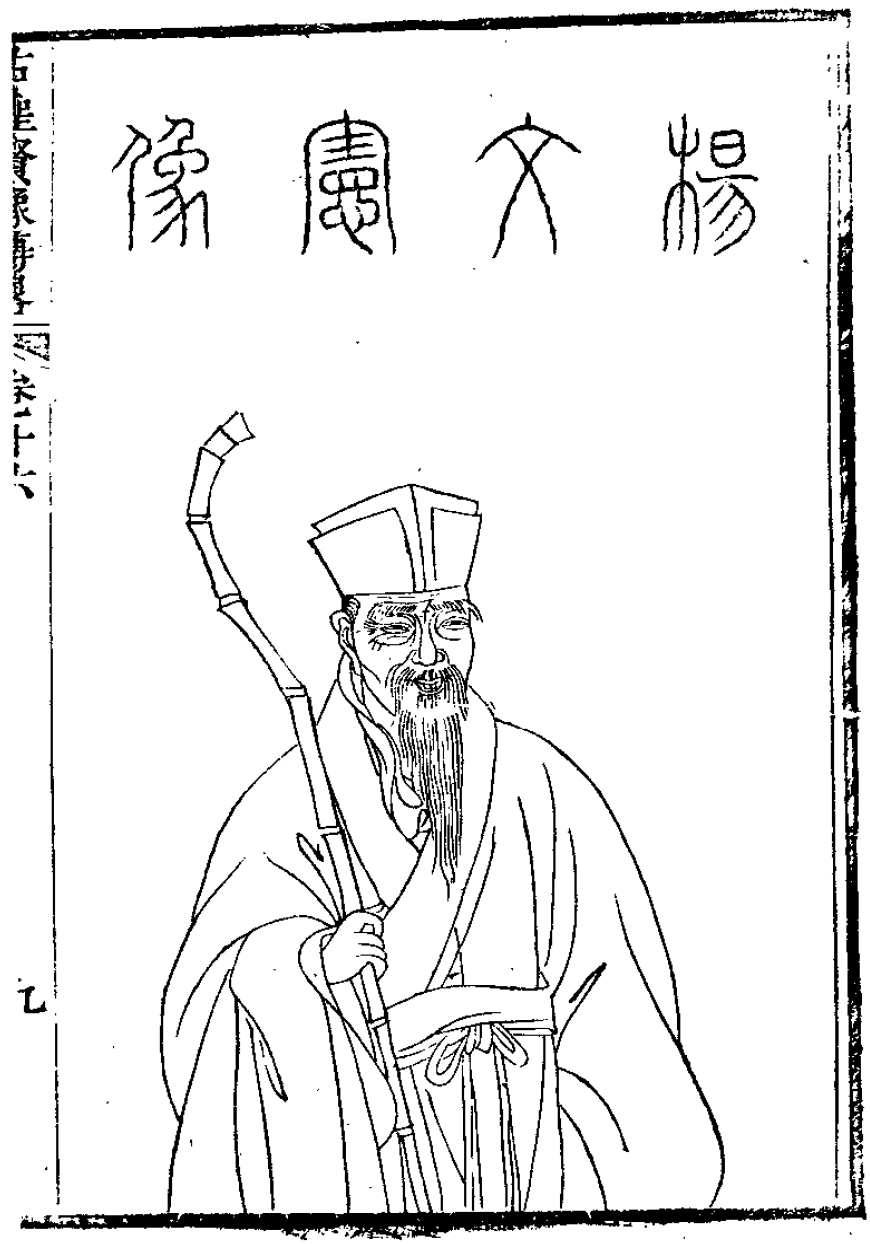
Yang Shen, as illustrated in the Qing dynasty book《古圣贤像传略》

Yang Shen (simplified Chinese: 杨慎; traditional Chinese: 楊慎; pinyin: Yáng Shèn; 1488–1559) was a poet in the Chinese Ming dynasty. His courtesy name was Yongxiu (用修); his art names included Sheng'an (升庵), Bonan Shanren (博南山人) and Diannan Shushi (滇南戍史).

Yang Shen was the son of Yang Tinghe and originally lived in Chengdu, Sichuan province. He there married Huang E, who was known for her own scholarship and became a poet.

As a result of the Great Rites Controversy of 1524, he was reduced to the status of commoner and exiled to Yunnan, where he spent over 30 years. His wife went to his family's house in Chengdu and took care of financial matters, the household and the raising of Yang family children, and only occasionally had time to visit him.

Yang Shen was well received by the Yunnanese literati and produced a substantial amount of writing inspired by the nature and culture of that province. Particularly well known are the Linjiangxian or The Immortals by the River (臨江仙) (later known as the introductory poem to the Romance of the Three Kingdoms and was employed as the lyrics of the opening theme of the namesake TV series), and his essay Roaming atop Diancang Mountain (点苍山志, Diancang Shan Zhi), inspired by a 1530 trip. He and his wife exchanged poems and letters. Some of the poems under her name might have been written by him as a parody on himself. In those, she admonishes him for his irresponsible lifestyle, while she has to take care of his family matters.

== See also ==
- Wu Qiuyan
