= Li Shixing =

Chinese landscape painter

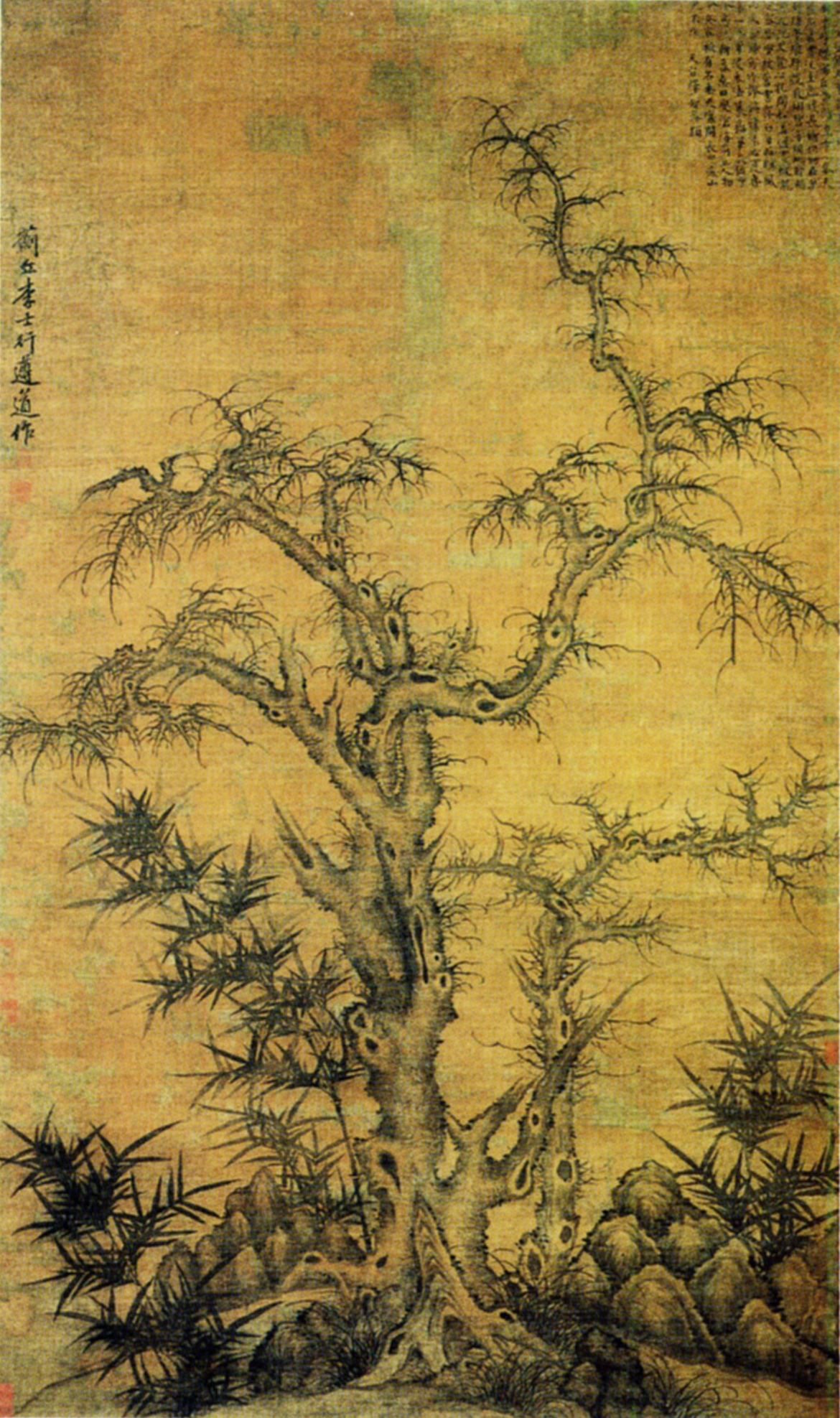
Li Shixing, Withered Tree, Bamboo, and Rocks 枯木竹石图. Shanghai Museum

Li Shixing (Chinese: 李士行; pinyin: Lǐ Shìxíng; Wade–Giles: Li Shih-hsing); ca. (1282–1328) was a Chinese landscape painter during the Yuan Dynasty (1271–1368).

Li was born in Beijing. He specialized in landscapes and ink bamboo paintings.
