= Wang Shizhen (Ming dynasty) =

Chinese official (1526–1590)

- 王世貞
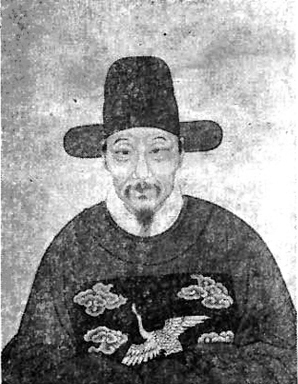

Nanjing Minister of Justice
- In office 1589–1590
- Monarch: Wanli

Personal details
- Born: 1526 Taicang, Nanzhili
- Died: 1590 (aged 63–64)
- Education: jinshi degree (1547)

Chinese name
- Traditional Chinese: 王世貞
- Simplified Chinese: 王世贞
Transcriptions
Standard Mandarin
- Hanyu Pinyin: Wáng Shìzhēn

Wang Shizhen (Note: Wang Shizhen used the courtesy name Yuanmei (元美) and the art names Fengzhou (鳳洲) and Yanzhou shanren (弇州山人).) (1526–1590) was a Chinese scholar-official, writer and historian during the Ming dynasty. A leading figure among the Latter Seven Masters, he served as a prominent literary arbiter and critic in Ming China during the 1570s and 1580s.

== Biography ==
Wang Shizhen was from Taicang (present-day county-level city of Suzhou in Jiangsu Province) and was born in 1526. He studied Confucianism, passed the civil service examinations, and in 1547 succeeded in the highest level—the palace examination—earning the jinshi degree. He then began his official career.

Wang was a competent official, but he did not stand out among his peers. In 1560, his career took a hit when his father was executed for failing to prevent a Mongol raid on Beijing the previous year. (Note: His father, Wang Shu (王忬, 1507–1560; jinshi 1547), served from 1555 as the supreme commander (zongdu) in Datong.) Wang returned home and remained there for seven years. Throughout his life, he harbored resentment towards Yan Song, a prominent statesman who was responsible for the execution of several of Wang's friends, including Yang Jisheng, who had criticized him. Wang wrote the play Mingfeng ji (鳴鳳記; 'The Phoenix's Cry'), in which the heroic Yang was portrayed as a victim of the wicked Yan. While Wang may not have been the actual author, he supported the circulation of the play. He also lived in seclusion between 1576 and 1588, seeking refuge in a monastery to escape an unhappy family life. The peak of Wang's career came when he served as minister of justice in Nanjing, a position he held from July 1589 to April 1590.

He resigned from office in April 1590 and died in December of the same year.

== Literary activity ==
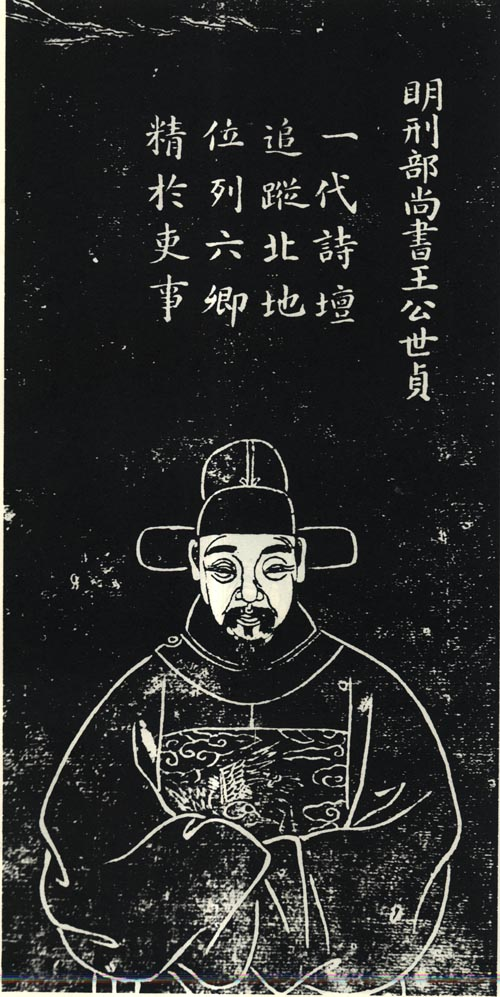
Stone inscription portrait of Wang Shizhen, from the Five Hundred Worthies Shrine at Canglang Pavilion, Suzhou

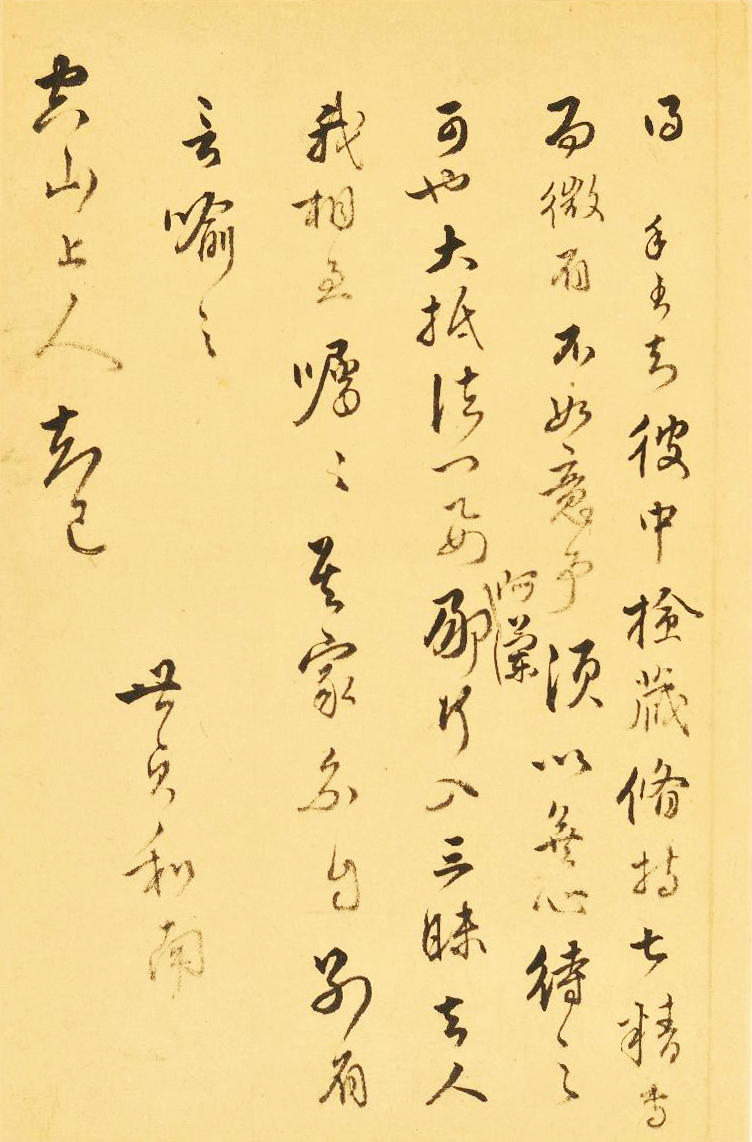
Wang Shizhen's handwritten letters in running script

In the late 1540s, he joined forces with the elder Li Panlong and formed a group of poets known as the Latter Seven Masters. After Li's death in 1570, he took on the role of leader, serving as an informal literary arbiter and earning the respect of many as the most esteemed critic in China. As the leader of the Latter Seven Masters, he advocated for the archaic literary movement, also known as the revivalists, who believed that the best prose was written during the Han period and earlier. In terms of poetry, he held the early and high Tang poets in high regard and believed that authors should emulate their methods. His position as the informal leader of the revivalists was met with criticism from followers of other literary groups. For example, Gui Youguang considered him to be an "average author" who was only celebrated by his own followers. Over time, he modified his literary-theoretical views, influenced by his diverse interests and the pressure of criticism. Unlike his colleagues, he also recognized authors from other periods, such as the Song writers Su Shi and Sima Guang, as long as they met his standards. (Note: In the following generation, Wang Shizhen's legacy was continued by the poets of the Gong'an school, who took as their models the poets of the mid-Tang period (especially Bai Juyi) and the Song period (Su Shi). The leading figures of this school were the brothers Yuan Hongdao, Yuan Zongdao, and Yuan Zhongdao.)

While he accepted imitation and copying in painting and calligraphy, he rejected them in literature. He believed that writers should always draw on their own ideas. He did not hesitate to repeatedly condemn even Li for lifeless imitation of his models. As a historian, he took a skeptical stance towards the accuracy and reliability of sources, but he also believed that no source should be excluded from history and that every source could be used in some form. His concern for accuracy and correctness extended beyond historical works—he criticized painters for depicting figures from earlier dynasties in historically inaccurate clothing and urged landscape painters to portray real, specific scenes rather than idealized visions of nature. He demanded that historians and prose writers present their arguments in plain and simple language, avoiding unnecessary ornamentation. According to him, the clarity of expression was meant to serve the author's ultimate goal of having their ideas accepted by readers.

Wang was a prolific writer who explored a wide range of cultural and artistic topics. He wrote poetry in various genres, including Song dynasty–style yuefu ballads, palace and garden poetry, and song lyrics. He also wrote short stories in both classical and colloquial language, essays on various subjects, and works on the history of art, literature, and politics. As a cultural conservative, he criticized the growing commercialization of society and the resulting decline of traditional values. Some of his most notable works include the 174-juan (volume) Yanzhou shanren sibu gao (弇州山人四部稿), a collection of poetry and prose, the 8-juan Jiajing yilai shoufu zhuan (嘉靖以來首輔傳), biographies of the members of the Grand Secretariat during the Jiajing Emperor's reign, and the Yanshantang bieji (弇山堂別集; 'Separate collection of Deep Mountain Studio'). He also wrote a 100-juan long history of the Ming dynasty, which can be considered an unofficial "Veritable Records", particularly for the reign of the Jianwen Emperor, as official records from this time period are unreliable.

He represented the generation that dominated Ming Chinese society between the decline of the Wang Yangming school after 1579 and the rise of the Donglin movement after 1604. This generation moved away from Confucian idealism and social activism, and instead developed an interest in literary aesthetics and scholarship. Wang's literary views, particularly his focus on textual criticism and skepticism, gained followers not only in China but also in Japan. He had a significant influence on Tokugawa Confucian writers, most notably Ogyū Sorai (1667–1728).
