= Wang Jiusi =

Wang Jiusi 王九思 (1468-1551) was a Chinese official, writer and satirical playwright from Shaanxi, one of the Former Seven Masters. He was a friend of Kang Hai, also from Shaanxi, and the pair were banished from the Ming court after being identified as belonging to Liu Jin's political faction.

His most famous zaju was a one-act adaptation of the folktale of the Wolf of Zhongshan.

== Works ==
- Zhongshan lang yuanben (The farce on the Wolf of Mount Zhong)
- Du Zimei gujiu youchun ji (Du Fu Buys Wine and Roams in the Spring)
