= Kang Hai =

Ming dynasty poet, dramatist, and prose writer

- 康海
- Born: August 22, 1475; Wugong County, Shaanxi
- Died: January 10, 1541 (aged 65); Shaanxi
- Occupation(s): Poet, dramatist, prose writer

Chinese name
- Chinese: 康海
Transcriptions
Standard Mandarin
- Hanyu Pinyin: Kāng Hǎi
- Wade–Giles: K'ang¹ Hai³

Courtesy name
- Chinese: 德涵
Transcriptions
Standard Mandarin
- Hanyu Pinyin: Dé Hán
- Wade–Giles: Te² Han²

Art name 1
- Traditional Chinese: 沜東
Transcriptions
Standard Mandarin
- Hanyu Pinyin: Pàn Dōng

Art name 2
- Traditional Chinese: 漁夫
Transcriptions
Standard Mandarin
- Hanyu Pinyin: Yú Fū

Art name 3
- Traditional Chinese: 湖西山人
Transcriptions
Standard Mandarin
- Hanyu Pinyin: Hú Xīshānrén

Kang Hai (康海; 1475–1541) was a poet, dramatist, and prose writer of Ming dynasty China. One of the Seven Early Masters (前七子), his works are still studied today.

== Early life ==
Kang Hai was born in Wugong County, Shaanxi. His great-great-grandfather Kang Ruji (康汝楫) served the Yongle Emperor in his household and was appointed a vice minister in his government in 1403. Kang Hai's father, Kang Yong (康鏞), was assistant registrar of Pingliang prefecture. His family was therefore affluent and of good social position.

Kang Hai did exceedingly well in the imperial examinations. The emperor himself remarked that there had been no better examination essay during the last century-and-a-half of Ming rule. Kang Hai therefore became the Zhuangyuan (optimus) of China for 1502, as the highest scoring of all graduates.

== Imperial career ==
Kang's first appointment was as a first-class compiler at the Hanlin Academy. There that he interacted with influential persons, earning friends and some enemies for his outspoken opposition to corruption and his literary style. In 1508 when the powerful eunuch Liu Jin was manipulating the young Zhengde Emperor, Kang Hai joined forces with other scholars in opposing him. Kang advocated for the release of his friend Li Mengyang from prison for also opposing the Liu.

Later in 1508, Kang's mother died and Kang retired. When Liu Jin fell from imperial favor in 1510, Kang also lost status, supposedly for collaborating with Liu's government.

== Life in Shaanxi ==
For the next thirty years, Kang "acted the part of a non-conformist hermit" with his friend Wang Jiusi, fearing being called back to office. The friends loved to drink wine, play the pipa, be noisy and act "like fools in order to give expression to their grievances". Kang rejected the rigidity of official life in order to live his own way.

== Death and legacy ==
Kang Hai died in 1541, at the age of 65. A posthumous collection of his writings was published four years later. Several other published works of his are known, including song poems, a local history, a genealogy, and two dramas.
