= Li Dongyang =

Chinese official (1447–1516)

- 李東陽
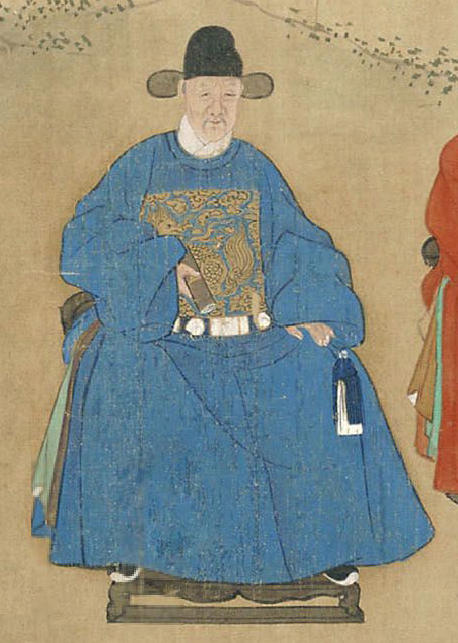
- Portrait of Li Dongyang as depicted in Ten Officials Who Passed the Imperial Examination in the Same Year of 1464 (甲申十同年圖), c. 1503.

Senior Grand Secretary
- In office 1506–1513
- Monarch: Zhengde
- Preceded by: Liu Jian
- Succeeded by: Yang Tinghe

Grand Secretary
- In office 1495–1513
- Monarchs: Hongzhi; Zhengde

Personal details
- Born: 21 July 1447 Chaling County (present-day Zhuzhou, Hunan)
- Died: 20 August 1516 (aged 69)
- Education: jinshi degree (1464)

Chinese name
- Traditional Chinese: 李東陽
- Simplified Chinese: 李东阳
Transcriptions
Standard Mandarin
- Hanyu Pinyin: Lǐ Dōngyáng
- Wade–Giles: Li Tung-yang

Li Dongyang (Note: Yang Yiqing used the courtesy name Binzhi (賓之) and the art name Xiya (西涯).) (21 July 1447 – 20 August 1516) was a Chinese literary critic, calligrapher, poet, and scholar-official of the Ming dynasty. He served as a grand secretary during the reigns of the Hongzhi and Zhengde emperors and headed the Grand Secretariat for several years, effectively serving as the head of the imperial government.

== Early life ==
Li Dongyang was born on 21 July 1447, during China's Ming dynasty, in Chaling County, Changsha Prefecture, Huguang Province (present-day Zhuzhou, Hunan). He came from a military family. His great-grandfather, Li Wenxiang (李文祥), had served in the personal guard of Zhu Di, Prince of Yan. His grandfather, Li Yunxing (李允興), was also a military officer who took part in the civil war that brought Zhu Di to the throne as the Yongle Emperor (r. 1402–1424). His father, Li Chun (李淳; 1417–1486), was the first member of the family to study for the civil service examinations. Li Dongyang's uncle Li Ze (李澤) continued the family's military tradition. Li Dongyang's mother was Lady Liu (died 1457).

Li Chun failed to achieve success in the imperial civil service examinations, but his son displayed remarkable talent from an early age. By the age of three, Li Dongyang could write complex Chinese characters and was presented to the Jingtai Emperor (r. 1449–1457). In 1454, he was enrolled in a government school at an unusually young age. After passing the local and provincial examinations, he passed the metropolitan and palace examinations in 1464, earning the jinshi degree at the age of 17.

== Official career ==
Li Dongyang entered the Hanlin Academy that same year, where he served for three decades and gradually rose through the ranks. He also presided over the provincial examination in Beijing in 1486 and the metropolitan examinations in 1493 and 1499. In 1494, Li was appointed vice minister of rites and began working in the Grand Secretariat, assisting in drafting routine imperial orders, chiefly honorary patents (誥敕). Following the death of Grand Secretary Qiu Jun in 1495, the Hongzhi Emperor (r. 1487–1505) appointed Li Dongyang and Xie Qian (謝遷) as acting grand secretaries. Their appointments became permanent in 1499. At the same time, Li was appointed junior guardian of the heir apparent (太子少保) and held the nominal title of minister of rites. After he completed the first edition of the Collected Statutes of the Ming Dynasty (Note: The Da-Ming huidian, or Collected Statutes of the Ming Dynasty, was a compilation of the administrative regulations and procedures of the Ming dynasty. Its origins can be traced to an earlier compilation commissioned by the Hongwu Emperor, the founder of the dynasty, in 1393. Work on the Da-Ming huidian itself began in 1497 under the supervision of Grand Secretary Xu Pu (徐溥; 1429–1499) and continued after his death. The compilation was completed in 1502 and subsequently revised under Li Dongyang before being published in 1509.) in 1503, he was promoted to grand guardian of the heir apparent (太子太保). On his deathbed in 1505, the Hongzhi Emperor entrusted his son and heir, the Zhengde Emperor (r. 1505–1521), to the grand secretaries Li, Xie, and Liu Jian (劉健). Li was simultaneously promoted to grand tutor of the heir apparent (太子太傅).

After his accession, the Zhengde Emperor favored the court eunuchs, particularly a group known as the Eight Tigers, over his grand secretaries and ministers. Liu Jian and Xie Qian attempted to curb the influence of the Eight Tigers, but the Emperor dismissed them both and sided with the Tigers. Li Dongyang, however, retained the Emperor's confidence, partly owing to his reputation for incorruptibility. As the only remaining grand secretary, he assumed leadership of the Grand Secretariat, which was subsequently joined by the Tigers' ally Jiao Fang (焦芳). Li was criticized by some of his fellow officials for cooperating with the Tigers, particularly Liu Jin. In 1510, he was awarded the prestigious honorary title of Left Pillar of State (特进左柱國) for his role in organizing the suppression of the Prince of Anhua's rebellion. He became the first grand secretary of the Ming dynasty to receive such an honor for military achievements.

In 1512, Jiang Bin, a 20-year-old officer of the Xuanfu garrison, became a new favorite of the Zhengde Emperor. Jiang proposed military reforms, arguing that the capital garrison lacked the combat experience needed to suppress rebellions. He recommended bringing experienced troops from the frontier garrisons to Beijing while transferring troops from the capital to the frontier. Li strongly opposed the proposal, arguing that capital troops lacked the military experience needed for frontier duty and would be unable to withstand the Mongols. Frontier troops, in turn, would struggle to adapt to the capital's regulations and discipline. He refused to draft the necessary imperial edict and resigned in protest in February 1513. His resignation brought an end to his 49-year official career, which had spanned the reigns of the Chenghua, Hongzhi, and Zhengde emperors. He died three years later, on 20 August 1516. The Zhengde Emperor honored him with the posthumous name Wenzheng (文正), in recognition of his literary achievements and upright conduct.

== Literary and artistic career ==
Li Dongyang's Tomb Inscription for Wang Hui (王徽墓表), written in running script

Li was a skilled calligrapher, particularly renowned for his seal script, though he also excelled in clerical script. His poetry represented the culmination of the 15th-century "cabinet style", (Note: Cabinet style (taige ti) was a form of poetry that emerged in Ming China in the early 15th century, during the reign of the Yongle Emperor (1402–1424). It was dominated by scholar-officials serving in the central government, whose works praised Confucian values and the emperor while celebrating the prosperity of the state through virtuous and orderly government.) which he interpreted broadly as a tradition of poetry written by high-ranking officials dating back to the Tang poet Bai Juyi. He advocated a return to shi poetry. Li regarded the Song dynasty scholar-official Ouyang Xiu as a model of a literary figure who combined the qualities of a poet and statesman, admiring the composure and propriety of his writings. Li's most highly regarded work was Nigu yuefu (擬古樂府; 'Imitative yuefu'), a collection of 101 ballads in the Han dynasty style, published in 1504 and subsequently reprinted in Korea and Japan. Li was the most respected literary critic of his time. Officials and literati regularly gathered at his home in the evenings after leaving their offices to discuss literature and the arts. Drawing on his influential position, Li supported and promoted a younger generation of poets associated with the Chaling school, (Note: The Chaling school (茶陵派; Chaling pai) was a literary group associated with Li Dongyang and writers closely linked to him. It was named after Chaling, the ancestral home of Li's family.) including Shao Bao (邵寶) and He Mengchun (何孟春). Li Mengyang also began his literary career in Li's circle and later became one of the Earlier Seven Masters, a literary group that rejected cabinet-style poetry as "empty" and advocated a return to classical literary models through the fugu ("revival of antiquity") movement.

== Family ==
Li married three times. His first wife, a woman surnamed Liu (劉), died around 1471. His second wife was a daughter of the scholar-official Yue Zheng (岳正; 1418–1472). She died in 1475, a few months after giving birth to their son, Li Zhaoxian (李兆先; 1475–1501). Li's third wife was a daughter of Zhu Yi (朱儀; 1427–1496), Duke of Cheng. Li had two children with Lady Zhu: a son, Li Zhaotong (李兆同; 1486–1495), and a daughter (1483–1510), who married Kong Wenshao (孔聞韶; died 1546), a 62nd-generation descendant of Confucius. Li also adopted his nephew Li Zhaofan (李兆藩), the son of his younger brother Li Dongming (李東溟). However, the family line appears to have died out within a few decades.
