= Latter Seven Masters =

Ming dynasty poetry circle

The Latter Seven Masters (Chinese: 后七子; pinyin: Hòu Qī Zǐ) was a Ming dynasty poetry circle composed of Liang Youyu, Li Panlong (李攀龙), Wang Shizhen (王世贞), Xie Zhen, Zong Chen, Xu Zhongxing and Wu Guolun (吴国伦).

== See also ==
- The Latter Five Poets of the Southern Garden
