= Li Mengyang =

- 李夢陽
- Born: January 16, 1473; Shaanxi
- Died: October 30, 1529; Kaifeng
- Occupations: Poet, philosopher, official

Chinese name
- Traditional Chinese: 李夢陽
- Simplified Chinese: 李梦阳
Transcriptions
Standard Mandarin
- Hanyu Pinyin: Lǐ Mèngyáng
- Wade–Giles: Li³ Meng⁴-yang²

Courtesy name
- Chinese: 獻吉
Transcriptions
Standard Mandarin
- Hanyu Pinyin: Xiàn Jí
- Wade–Giles: Hsien⁴ Chi²

Art name
- Traditional Chinese: 空同子
- Simplified Chinese: 空同子
Transcriptions
Standard Mandarin
- Hanyu Pinyin: Kōng Tóngzi
- Wade–Giles: K'ung¹ Tung²-tzu

Li Mengyang (李夢陽; 1473–1529) was a poet and philosopher of the Ming dynasty. He was a founder of the Archaist movement (復古).

== Early life ==
Li Mengyang was born into a military family in Shaanxi. Around the time of his birth, Li's inebriate granduncle lost the family's properties in a bet, resulting in the family becoming very poor. However, Li's father became an official and the family moved to Kaifeng.

Li Mengyang attempted the Henan provincial examination in 1489, but failed. The following year he married Zuo Shi (左氏), great-great-granddaughter of prince Zhu Su, and they had a son together. They moved to Qingyang and Li passed the Shaanxi provincial examination at Xi'an in 1492. He would stay there for another five years, teaching and studying.

== Time in Beijing and first imprisonment ==
Li moved to Beijing in 1498. There he joined the literary circle of Li Dongyang (no relation), where he enthusiastically participated. He received an appointment as a secretary in the Ministry of Revenue. After an assignment in Tongzhou, he was sent to Yulin, Shaanxi. It was there in 1501 that he discovered a massive tax evasion scheme involving merchants and imperial relatives. When Li tried to expose the fraud, he incurred the wrath of many who accused him of corruption and Li was removed from office. He was later exonerated and returned to his post.

Li was assigned to various other missions, but spent the rest of his time at the capital. He became a leading member of a group of poets known as the Seven Early Masters (前七子). In 1505, he sent a long letter to the Hongzhi Emperor describing eleven abuses requiring attention, including warnings regarding the brothers of the empress. Enraged, the brothers (Zhang Heling 張鶴齡 and Zhang Yanling 張延齡) and the empress urged the emperor to punish Li. Li was imprisoned, but later fined and released when he explained that he referred to the Zhang family, not the empress herself.

Later that year, the Zhengde Emperor took the throne and Li received a promotion to deputy director of a bureau. He received another promotion a year later to acting director. In October 1506, when Han Wen (韓文), Minister of Revenue, and most other high officials joined forces to attack Liu Jin and other powerful eunuchs for manipulating the emperor, Li Mengyang drafted the grivance letter. However, they failed and Liu Jin had them dismissed and punished. Li was demoted and left Beijing.

== Return to Kaifeng and second imprisonment ==
Li Mengyang returned to Kaifeng to stay at his elder brother's farm near the Yellow River. He spent a year there, teaching and writing. Among his writings during this time were poems criticizing Liu Jin's court. When Liu Jin heard about this, he was enraged. He had Li Mengyang arrested, brought back to the capital in chains, and imprisoned. Li managed to get his friend Kang Hai (康海) to advocate for him and Li was released.

In 1510, the powerful eunuch Liu Jin fell from favor with the emperor and was executed. Li Mengyang was commended for opposing Liu, and he was reinstated in 1511 as deputy bureau director. Then, he was promoted another time to surveillance vice commissioner of Jiangxi in charge of education.

== Time in Jiangxi and third imprisonment ==
In Jiangxi, Li made great strides in improving education. He encouraged students to study classical literature and to maintain their dignity in dealing with officials. He restored the White Deer Academy and ordered the establishment of local schools throughout the province.

Li's students refused to kneel in the presence of local functionaries, and Li was criticized for this. Later, in 1514 some of his students had a fight with the guards of a prince. Li defended his students and had the guards flogged. When the prince got word of this, Li was reported to the imperial clan and an investigation followed. Li was to face trial, but imperial officials knew that thousands of students were ready to fight for Li in Nanchang, so the trial was held at Guangxin 130 miles east.

When Li arrived late for his trial, he was thrown in prison. Even though he was exonerated in the trial, Li was removed from his position. After his release in June, Li and his family stayed for a short time in Xiangyang before returning to Kaifeng.

== Retirement and fourth imprisonment ==
In 1516, Li Mengyang's wife died. He wrote three poems eulogizing her, which were put to music by a local master and published. Other poets including Yang Yiqing (楊一清) asked Li to edit their works.

In 1521, an imperial censor accused Li of having connections with a Zhu Chenhao, a rebel prince, who had attempted to start a rebellion in 1519. Li Mengyang was once again imprisoned, and later exonerated in September 1522, but stripped of his official status.

== Legacy and death ==
Li's son, Li Zhi (李枝) did very well in imperial examinations and became a high official. Li Mengyang died in Kaifeng in 1529, and he was buried next to his wife. Li had published several works over his life, and a number of posthumous editions were published. He remained a popular hero as a fighter against political corruption. Author Chang Wei Ong says Li Mengyang established "a theory and a vocabulary for building a concordant world based on a self that was defined through qing", breaking through the orthodoxy.
