= Huo Tao =

Chinese official (1487–1540)

- 霍韜

Personal details
- Born: 13 May 1487
- Died: 5 November 1540 (aged 53)
- Education: jinshi degree (1514)

Chinese name
- Traditional Chinese: 霍韜
- Simplified Chinese: 霍韬
Transcriptions
Standard Mandarin
- Hanyu Pinyin: Huò Tāo

Huo Tao (Note: Huo Tao used the courtesy name Weixian (渭先) and the art name Wuya (兀崖), later Weiya (渭厓). He was given the posthumous name Wenmin (文敏).) (13 May 1487 – 5 November 1540) was a Chinese scholar-official during the Ming dynasty. Born into a wealthy merchant family in Nanhai, Guangdong, he earned the jinshi degree in 1514. His strong support for the Jiajing Emperor during the Great Rites Controversy of the 1520s led to rapid advancement in his career. However, his uncompromising defense of his principles also earned him a reputation as a quarrelsome official with whom others found it difficult to work.

== Early life and career ==
Huo Tao was born on 13 May 1487 during China's Ming dynasty, in Nanhai County in central Guangdong Province. He came from a wealthy merchant family. Although he led a carefree youth, he turned to the study of Confucianism at around the age of 18 and mastered the Confucian classics within a few years. In 1512, he was admitted to the prefectural Confucian school. The following year, he placed second in the provincial civil service examination, and in 1514 he achieved the highest score in the metropolitan examination before placing fourth in the palace examination, thereby earning the jinshi degree. According to tradition, he was denied first place in the palace examination because an attendant carelessly affixed the official seal upside down on his examination paper.

After passing the examinations, Huo was assigned to a probationary post at the Ministry of Personnel. Shortly afterward, however, he returned home to marry and remained there until the spring of 1521, when he resumed his official career. While traveling to Beijing, he learned that the Zhengde Emperor had died and his cousin, the Jiajing Emperor, had ascended the throne. He arrived in Beijing in July 1521.

== Great Rites Controversy ==
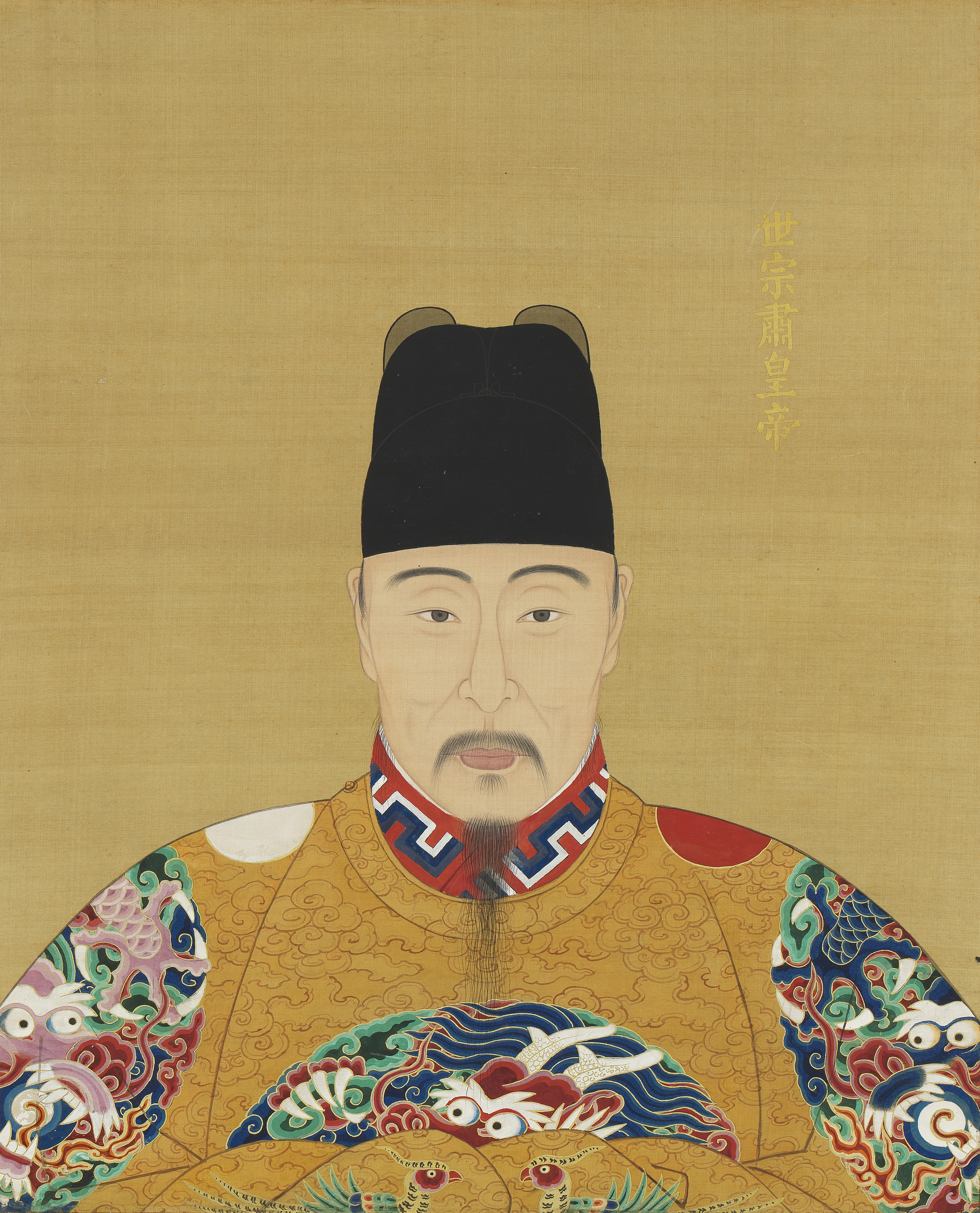
After the Jiajing Emperor (pictured) ascended the throne, Huo supported his position in the Great Rites Controversy.

After arriving in Beijing, Huo became involved in the emerging Great Rites Controversy, which concerned the status of the Jiajing Emperor's parents. He submitted a memorandum to the Ministry of Rites in support of the Emperor. He argued that the ministry's demands undermined the Emperor's relationship with his parents and relied on the Rites of Zhou and inappropriate historical precedents. Huo regarded the Rites of Zhou as a late forgery. During Huo's subsequent exchange of memorials with Minister of Rites Mao Cheng (毛澄), the newly graduated jinshi Zhang Cong publicly declared his support for the Emperor's position in August 1521.

In September 1521, Huo took up a position as a secretary in the Ministry of War. On 6 November 1521, he summarized his position on the Great Rites Controversy in a memorandum to the Emperor. Like Zhang Cong, he argued that the bonds between parents and children, grounded in the natural order of the world and human morality, should take precedence over considerations of state interest. He proposed that the Emperor honor his parents, pay due respect to previous emperors and empresses, and continue the line of succession established by the Zhengde Emperor.

After a year in office, Huo submitted proposals for reorganizing the government's accounting system and assessed Grand Secretary Yang Tinghe, the emperor's principal opponent in the Great Rites Controversy, as unworthy of receiving an aristocratic title. He also attracted attention by requesting permission to retire on health grounds, apparently suffering from tuberculosis, and unusually attributed his condition to sexual excesses in his youth. He later explained that he had done so to warn the Emperor and encourage him to practice moderation. In 1524, the Emperor summoned his supporters among the officials to Beijing. Zhang Cong, Gui E, and Xi Shu arrived, but Huo Tao remained at home.

== Career in the late 1520s ==
In 1526, Huo received the honorary post of junior supervisor of instruction, which represented a promotion of several ranks, from rank 6a to 3a. In 1527, he finally arrived in Beijing and took part in the compilation of the Minglun dadian (Great Canon for Clarifying Human Relations), a collection of arguments supporting the Emperor's position in the Great Rites Controversy, which was completed and published in June 1528. He was subsequently promoted to supervisor of instruction. The position allowed him to submit recommendations and proposals on current political issues from a high-ranking position without being burdened by regular administrative duties. For this reason, he requested to retain the position when he was offered an appointment as minister of rites in 1528.

In 1529, Huo and Zhang Cong presided over the metropolitan examination. He again departed from convention by refusing to regard the successful candidates as his students, instead declaring that they should consider themselves students of the emperor. He supported colleagues who, like him, had sided with the emperor in the Great Rites Controversy. For example, in October 1529, he convinced the Emperor that the accusations that had led to the dismissal of Zhang Cong and Gui E a month earlier were the result of intrigues by Grand Secretary Yang Yiqing. The Emperor subsequently dismissed Yang and restored Zhang and Gui to office. In discussions of substantive issues, however, Huo followed his own judgment regardless of the people involved. This policy earned him a reputation as a quarrelsome official with whom others had difficulty working. It proved costly in 1530, when he rejected the official Xia Yan's proposal to reform the rites for imperial sacrifices to Heaven and Earth. Xia's proposal had the Emperor's firm support. When Huo refused the Emperor's request to withdraw his objections, the Emperor had him arrested. Huo remained in prison for a month before withdrawing his objections. After his release, he returned to office but soon returned home to observe mourning for his mother.

== Career in the 1530s ==
Huo returned to Beijing in 1533, where he took up the position of vice minister of personnel. He avoided major conflicts for the next three years, until in 1536 Liu Shuxiang (劉淑相), (Note: Liu Shuxiang (d. 1537), like Huo Tao, earned the jinshi degree in 1514.) the prefectural governor of Beijing, attempted to abolish payments made to members of certain wealthy Beijing families for services to the state that they did not actually perform. Liu accused several high-ranking officials, including Grand Secretary Xia Yan, of accepting bribes to protect the practice. Xia responded by accusing Huo of supporting Liu. The Emperor subsequently dismissed Liu from the civil service and transferred Huo to the more prestigious but less influential position of minister of rites in Nanjing.

While in Nanjing, Huo Tao accused Buddhist nuns in the Nanzhili region of immoral conduct in 1537 and obtained the Emperor's approval for the dissolution of local convents. He subsequently closed 78 convents, confiscated their lands, and converted their buildings to public uses, such as schools and shrines. He sent 238 elderly nuns to their families or to institutions for the elderly (yangji yuan), (Note: Yangji yuan (養濟院; 'Nurture-and-Relieve Almshouse') were government-run institutions established throughout the Ming dynasty to care for people without family support, including the elderly, orphans, the poor, and people with disabilities. They provided basic necessities such as grain and cloth to support their livelihoods.) while the 210 younger nuns who did not find husbands within three months were married to soldiers of the Nanjing garrison. To maintain order and morality, he also regulated the length and style of women's clothing and prohibited feasting and music at funerals.

In May 1539, as part of a major reorganization of the office of instruction for the three-year-old heir apparent, Zhu Zairui, Huo was appointed joint supervisor, junior guardian of the heir apparent, and formally also minister of rites. Before he arrived in Beijing, he received an official reprimand from the Emperor in August 1539 after compiling, together with his subordinate Zou Shouyi (鄒守益), a book intended to instruct the heir. The Emperor interpreted some passages as indirect criticism of himself. While traveling to Beijing, Huo came to believe that officials traveling with the imperial entourage generally imposed more corvée obligations on the population than they were legally entitled to demand, with Marquis Guo Xun and one other official being rare exceptions. Huo considered the Emperor's recent journey from Beijing to Anlu particularly burdensome for the people. He therefore opposed the Jiajing Emperor's consideration of another journey to the provinces. The Emperor was displeased, but ultimately abandoned the plan; the people of the affected provinces were reportedly grateful to Huo.

Huo died in Beijing on 5 November 1540. He was posthumously promoted to grand guardian of the heir apparent and granted the posthumous name Wenmin (文敏). His essays on various subjects, official writings and memoranda, writings concerning his native Guangdong, instructions for his family, and other works were compiled and published by one of his sons, Huo Yuxia (霍與瑕). His philosophical writings have not survived, and all but one of his paintings have also been lost. Huo had nine sons and six daughters. His son Huo Yuxia (1522–1592) achieved some prominence, serving as a county magistrate in Cixi, Zhejiang from 1559 to 1561, and later as an intendant in Guangxi.
