= Fang Xianfu =

Chinese official (1485–1544)

- 方獻夫

Senior Grand Secretary
- In office 1532–1533
- Monarch: Jiajing
- Preceded by: Zhang Cong
- Succeeded by: Zhang Cong

Grand Secretary
- In office 1532–1534
- Monarch: Jiajing

Minister of Personnel
- In office 1529–1532
- Monarch: Jiajing
- Preceded by: Gui E
- Succeeded by: Wang Qiong

Minister of Rites
- In office 1527–1529
- Monarch: Jiajing
- Preceded by: Gui E
- Succeeded by: Li Shi

Personal details
- Born: 1485
- Died: 26 June 1544 (aged 58–59)
- Education: jinshi degree (1505)

Chinese name
- Traditional Chinese: 方獻夫
- Simplified Chinese: 方献夫
Transcriptions
Standard Mandarin
- Hanyu Pinyin: Fāng Xiànfū

Fang Xianfu (Note: Fang Xianfu was originally named Fang Xianke (方獻科). He used the courtesy name Shuxian (叔賢) and the art name Xiqiao (西樵).) (1485 – 26 June 1544) was a Chinese scholar-official and philosopher who held various senior offices during the early reign of the Ming emperor Jiajing. In the early 1520s, he supported the Jiajing Emperor during the Great Rites Controversy, after which he successively rose from member of the Hanlin Academy to senior grand secretary between 1524 and 1532. Fang's scholarship encompassed studies of the I Ching, ritual studies, and theories of mind-nature (xinxing). His major works include Guwen Zhouyi zhuanyi yueshuo with Xiqiao yigao.

== Early life ==
Fang Xianfu was from Nanhai County in central Guangdong Province. Born in 1485 during China's Ming dynasty, he was a posthumous child; his father, Fang Sui (方遂), died 28 days before his birth. He studied Confucian teachings and entered the civil service examinations. He passed the provincial examination in 1504 and the metropolitan and palace examinations in 1505, receiving the jinshi degree.

After passing the examinations, Fang was appointed to the Hanlin Academy but soon requested leave from office to care for his mother, Lady Huang (黃氏). She died shortly thereafter, and Fang remained at home in mourning. He later served in the Ministry of Rites and then in the Ministry of Personnel, where he became a vice director of a bureau. During his time in Beijing, he became acquainted with the teachings of Wang Yangming and became one of his many disciples. Due to illness, he resigned from office in 1511 and returned to his native region.

For about a decade afterward, Fang lived mainly on Mount Xiqiao. He frequently met with his friend Huo Tao, also a Nanhai native, and the scholar Zhan Ruoshui to discuss scholarly and philosophical questions. With Wang and Zhan, Fang discussed the Great Learning, the Doctrine of the Mean, the investigation of things (格物), and questions concerning the mind and human nature (心性). During this time, he also wrote works such as Origins of the Great Learning (大學原).

== Great Rites Controversy ==
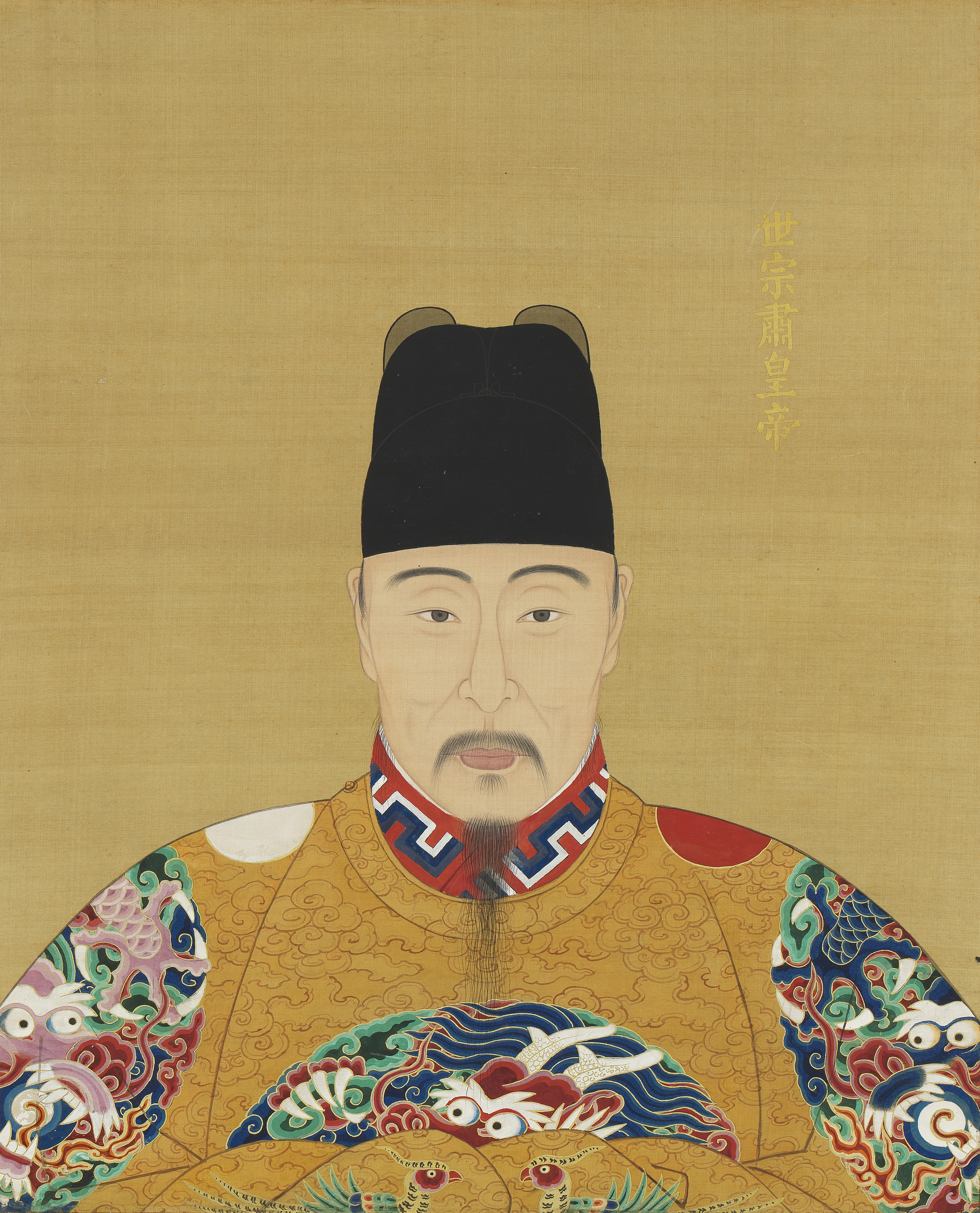
After the Jiajing Emperor (pictured) ascended the throne, Fang supported his position in the Great Rites Controversy.

After the accession of the Jiajing Emperor in 1521, Fang was recalled to government service. On his way to Beijing, he learned that a dispute (later known as the Great Rites Controversy) had erupted between the Emperor and the bureaucracy concerning the status of the Emperor's parents. Fang drafted a memorial in support of the Emperor. (Note: The Great Rites Controversy was a political dispute from 1521 to 1524 between the Jiajing Emperor and much of the bureaucracy over the status of the Emperor's parents.) After returning to his former post at the ministry and becoming acquainted with the situation, he kept his views to himself, as almost all officials had taken a position against the Emperor.

Fang's memorial reached the Nanjing Ministry of Justice official Gui E through unofficial channels. In early 1524, Gui submitted a memorial of his own supporting the Emperor's position in the controversy. To demonstrate that the Emperor had broader support, he appended the earlier memorials by officials Fang Xianfu and Xi Shu to his submission. At the time, only a few relatively minor officials had openly supported the Emperor, including Fang, Xi, Gui, Zhang Cong, Huo Tao, and Xiong Jia (熊浹).

The Emperor began appointing his newfound supporters to senior positions, with Xi becoming minister of rites and Fang becoming a member of the Hanlin Academy in July 1524 at the same time Gui and Zhang were appointed its chancellors. Dozens of Beijing officials protested the appointments, arguing that the promotion of apparent careerists would demoralize upright officials throughout the empire. Fang had no interest in confronting his opponents and responded to the accusations of careerism by withdrawing from the political struggle. In August 1524, he requested permission to resign from government service, stating that he had no desire for office and had supported the Emperor on moral grounds. The Emperor rejected his resignation. The dispute culminated in August 1524 with a public demonstration by hundreds of officials outside the Zuoshun Gate in the imperial palace. The Jiajing Emperor responded by severely punishing the protesters.

== Minister ==
In 1527, Fang assembled a selection of memorials defending the Emperor's position in the Great Rites. He believed that the issues at stake had not been adequately explained or understood, and the Jiajing Emperor authorized the Ministry of Rites to print and circulate the memorials of Zhang Cong and other supporters, together with Fang's compilation. Zhang and several colleagues later produced a fuller work which the Emperor titled Minglun dadian (Great Canon for Clarifying Human Relations). The Emperor instructed Zhang to revise Xi Shu's arguments and add relevant examples from the Han and Song dynasties. The work was completed and published in June 1528. In August 1527, Fang was appointed acting chief minister of the Court of Judicial Review, while Zhang Cong became acting left censor-in-chief and Gui E acting minister of justice. The three were tasked with handling the Li Fuda case, a complicated affair involving Zhang Yin (張寅), a Beijing alchemist and drug maker variously accused of being the revolt leader Li Fuda (李福達) and the sorcerer Li Wu (李午). The Emperor's confidant, Marquis Guo Xun, was also implicated in the case. Fang, Zhang, and Gui concluded that Zhang Yin was innocent. Several dozen officials who had called for his execution, including the former minister of justice Yan Yishou (顏頤壽), were subsequently dismissed from office and assigned to military service on the frontier; some died as a result of beatings. After the case was settled, Gui and Fang were promoted continuously throughout late 1527, Gui as minister of rites and Fang as right vice minister of rites then left vice minister of personnel. Before the end of the year, the Emperor appointed Gui as minister of personnel and Fang as the new minister of rites.

In March 1529, Gui was appointed grand secretary, while continuing to serve as minister of personnel, but the Emperor removed him from both positions in September that year. Fang became the new minister of personnel. He later served as chief editor of the Da Ming Huidian. (Note: A compilation of statutes and administrative regulations governing the functions and responsibilities of the state institutions of the Ming dynasty.) In 1530, Fang was accused of favoritism in personnel appointments and poor judgment in selecting officials. He repeatedly requested leave on the grounds of ill health, and the Emperor allowed him to return home to recuperate, with Vice Minister Dong Pi (董圮) temporarily overseeing the Ministry of Personnel. The Emperor recalled Fang to serve again as minister of personnel in December 1531. Fang declined and recommended Liang Cai (梁材), Wang Hong (汪鋐), and Wang Tingxiang as replacements, but the Emperor continued to urge him to return. While still on his journey, Fang again requested permission to return home. The Emperor ordered him to recuperate along the way and continue to Beijing once his health had improved.

== Later life ==
After Fang arrived in Beijing in July 1532, the Emperor appointed him grand secretary. Fang initially declined the appointment and did not attend the Grand Secretariat for several days because he had not yet personally thanked the Emperor for his favor. After the Emperor sent a palace eunuch to Fang's residence to urge him to take up his post, Fang finally began serving as grand secretary. He temporarily took charge of the Ministry of Personnel after Minister Wang Qiong died in August. In September 1532, Senior Grand Secretary Zhang Cong resigned after the Emperor interpreted a comet as an ominous sign from Heaven, and Fang became senior grand secretary. The Nanjing censor Feng En (馮恩) considered Zhang's resignation an inadequate response to the appearance of the comet and formally called for the execution of both Zhang and Fang. The Emperor then imprisoned Feng, but Zhang persuaded him to spare both the accused and accusers in this and several other cases.

In 1533, Fang proposed restoring the system under which officials in the censorial and remonstrance offices scrutinized one another. In April, Zhang returned to the position of senior grand secretary, while Fang remained a grand secretary until 1534. Fang was granted the honorary title of junior guardian in February 1534. He subsequently requested retirement several times because of declining health, and the Emperor granted his request in May.

After retiring, Fang lived in Xiqiao, where he continued revising his writings and maintained contact with scholars such as Zhan Ruoshui. He died on 26 June 1544. The court honored him with the title of grand guardian and bestowed on him the posthumous name Wenxiang.

== Intellectual thought ==
=== Lixue, study of rites ===
Fang's views on ritual appear mainly in his memorials during the Great Rites Controversy and in the Afterword (後序) to the Minglun dadian. He held that ritual should reflect kinship relationships and ordinary human feelings. Referring to the principle that "the sages established ritual in accordance with human feelings", he argued that ritual could not be separated from human sentiment. In the Afterword to the Minglun dadian, he wrote that "the great source of the Way comes from Heaven and arises in the heart." He further stated that teaching follows human nature, ritual follows human feelings, and filial piety follows the heart, thus placing all three in the realm of the human heart.

In his early memorials on the Great Rites, Fang distinguished between imperial succession and family lineage. The Jiajing Emperor had succeeded the Zhengde Emperor in the imperial line, while his relationship with his biological father, the Prince of Xing, was a matter of family lineage. Fang therefore argued that the emperor could succeed the Zhengde Emperor while continuing to regard the Prince of Xing as his father. As the prince had never been emperor, he should be worshipped in a separate temple rather than placed in the Imperial Ancestral Temple or given a temple name. (Note: Ultimately, in 1538, the prince was given the temple name Ruizong by his son, the Jiajing Emperor.)

=== Yixue, study of the I Ching ===
Fang's studies of the I Ching (or Yijing) are mainly found in Guwen Zhouyi zhuanyi yueshuo (古文周易傳義約說; 'An Annotated Summary of the Ancient Text of the Zhouyi') and Xiqiao yigao (西樵遺稿; 'Commentaries and Collected Manuscripts of Xiqiao'). In the former, he followed Zhu Xi's arrangement of the ancient text, separating the upper and lower parts of the I Ching from the Ten Wings. He drew on Cheng Yi's Yizhuan (易傳; 'Commentary on the Yijing') and Zhu Xi's Zhouyi benyi (周易本義; 'Original Meaning of the Zhouyi'), while also incorporating the interpretations of Shao Yong and other scholars of the Song and Yuan dynasties. He regarded xiangshu (象數, image-number symbolism) as fundamental to understanding the hexagram and line statements and their underlying meaning.

Regarding the formation of the Zhou yi, Fang held that Fuxi drew the eight trigrams, King Wen of Zhou developed them into the sixty-four hexagrams and composed their names, judgments, and line statements, while Confucius wrote the Yizhuan. He thus attributed the eight trigrams, sixty-four hexagrams, ancient text, and Yizhuan respectively to these respective authors. Fang's understanding differed from Zhu Xi's view that Fuxi created the sixty-four hexagrams and the Duke of Zhou composed the line statements.

The Guwen Zhouyi zhuanyi yueshuo opens with seven diagrams, including the Wenwang bagua yingtian tu (文王八卦應天圖; 'Diagram of King Wen's Eight Trigrams Corresponding to Heaven'), the Wenwang bagua yingdi tu (文王八卦應地圖; 'Diagram of King Wen's Eight Trigrams Corresponding to Earth'), the Wenwang ze Hetu tu (文王則河圖圖; 'Diagram of King Wen Following the Hetu'), and the Ze Luoshu tu (則洛書圖; 'Diagram of Following the Luoshu'). Fang interpreted both the "Earlier Heaven" (先天) and "Later Heaven" (後天) arrangements of the eight trigrams, which Zhu Xi had treated separately, as having been established by King Wen. He also used the position of the number "five" in the Hetu (河圖; 'Yellow River Chart') and Luoshu (洛書; 'Inscription of the River Luo') to explain the basis of the Dayan number (大衍之數), the Four Images (四象), and the divination method.

Fang also applied the Zhou yi to political affairs and the cultivation of the ruler's virtue. Drawing on the Xie hexagram's image of "pardoning errors and remitting offenses", he once urged the Jiajing Emperor to pardon officials who had been punished for their views in the Great Rites Controversy. He also cited the Sun hexagram's injunction to "restrain anger and curb desires" in urging the emperor to control his emotions and place greater trust in his officials. He regarded "centrality and harmony" (中和) as a key principle of the learning of the sages.

=== Xinxing (Theory of mind and human nature) and differences with the Wang School ===
Fang held that the principles underlying the world originated in the human heart (人心). He regarded Heaven (天), spirit (神), centrality (中), the ultimate (極), change (易), benevolence (仁), sincerity (誠), human nature (性), the Way (道), and virtue (德), despite their different names, as referring in substance to the same principle underlying Heaven, Earth, and all things. He used yijian (易簡; 'simplicity and ease') to describe the cultivation of the Way of the sages, arguing that learning should be rooted in the heart rather than confined to elaborate textual interpretation. In Origins of the Great Learning, Origins of the Doctrine of the Mean (中庸原), and Preface to the Engraving of the Two Originals (刻二原序), he likewise presented the Great Learning and the Doctrine of the Mean as teachings on self-cultivation and governance that begin with the heart and extend from the inner self to the world.

On human nature, Fang held that the Way of Heaven (天道) is inherently good, but that once human beings and other things acquire physical form and a psycho-physical disposition (氣質), their natures may contain both good and evil because of differences in the senses, the clarity or turbidity of vital energy, and other factors. He rejected the interpretation of "the nature of Heaven and Earth" (天地之性) and "the nature of psycho-physical disposition" (氣質之性) as two separate natures. In interpreting the phrase "following one's nature is called the Way" (率性之謂道; shuai xing zhi wei dao) from the Doctrine of the Mean, he glossed shuai (率, "to follow") as shuai (帥, "to lead" or "to command"). He therefore understood the Way as governing and directing human nature, rather than merely following one's innate nature.

Although Fang studied under Wang Yangming, he did not fully accept Wang's interpretations of the classics. On questions such as the investigation of things, broad learning (博文), and the textual structure of the Great Learning, Fang maintained that the classics should be interpreted by comparing their passages with one another, rather than by developing doctrines detached from their original wording. Wang criticized him for becoming "entangled and stalled by textual meanings" (牽滯文義), while Zhan Ruoshui likewise saw in his teaching the "defect of affirming the inner while negating the outer" (是內非外之病). Around 1516, when Fang visited Zhan, he conveyed Wang's view that "in the end, it is all empty" (到底是空) represented the ultimate point of learning and invited Zhan to debate the matter with Wang. The three subsequently exchanged letters on the nature of the mind, Heavenly Principle (天理), and the distinction between Confucianism and Buddhism.
