= Li Fuda case =

Political affair in Ming China (1526–1527)

The Li Fuda case, (Note: Simplified Chinese: 李福达之狱; traditional Chinese: 李福達之獄; pinyin: Lǐ Fúdá zhī yù) known at the time as the Great Case, (Note: Simplified Chinese: 大狱; traditional Chinese: 大獄; pinyin: Dà yù) was a complex criminal and political affair that occupied the highest judicial authorities of Ming China in 1526–1527. The case concerned Zhang Yin (張寅), a Beijing alchemist and maker of medicines who was accused of living under a false identity and of actually being the revolt leader Li Fuda (李福達) or the sorcerer Li Wu (李午). Zhang Yin had for some time served in the household of Guo Xun, Marquis of Wuding and a close confidant of the Jiajing Emperor. Zhang's sons therefore sought Guo's assistance. The investigating officials responded to Guo's intervention by accusing him of aiding a rebel and mass murderer. Several rounds of interrogations and investigations followed, producing conflicting conclusions. In the discussions of the case within the central judicial and censorial authorities, former supporters of the Emperor during the Great Rites Controversy—including Guo Xun, Minister Xi Shu, and senior officials Zhang Cong, Gui E, Fang Xianfu, and others—found themselves opposed to former opponents of the Emperor.

The case ended with the Emperor accepting the decision of Zhang Cong, Gui E, and Fang Xianfu that Zhang Yin was innocent and should be released. This was followed by a purge of the bureaucracy and the punishment of several dozen officials who had supported Zhang Yin's execution. In 1569, the case was reopened. In the subsequent review of the trial, Zhang Yin was declared to have been the rebel Li Fuda, and the officials punished in 1527 were rehabilitated.

== Background ==
In 1526, after an extended stay in Beijing, a man named Zhang Yin (張寅) returned to Shanxi province. The local authorities arrested him following an accusation that he was in fact the rebel Li Fuda (李福達), who in 1512 had led a White Lotus rebellion in Shaanxi province together with his uncle. He was also accused of being the sorcerer Li Wu (李午).

The investigation found that Zhang Yin was a wealthy merchant who had lived in Beijing for several years with his three sons. He was officially registered as an officer of the garrison in Taiyuan, the capital of Shanxi, while in Beijing, he was registered as an artisan and his sons as alchemists and medicine makers. Zhang was identified by an old enemy as a rebel leader, but the local authorities cleared him of the charges and instead punished his accuser.

== The case ==
One of Zhang's sons, however, sought the assistance of Guo Xun, Marquis of Wuding, a close confidant of the Jiajing Emperor. Zhang had previously served in the marquis's household, supplying him with aphrodisiacs and providing his son as a male lover. Guo intervened with Ma Lu (馬錄), the regional inspector of Shanxi. Ma was convinced that Zhang Yin and Li Fuda were the same person and was preparing to put him on trial, seeking out witnesses who knew Li Fuda. When Guo requested that the case be halted, Ma instead entered the request into the case file as evidence of a criminal conspiracy by Guo to protect a wanted rebel and mass murderer. Two of Zhang's sons were arrested in Beijing, after which Zhang himself surrendered to the authorities in Shanxi.

Guo was also accused of embezzling a substantial amount of silver and grain intended for the Beijing garrison. Minister of Rites Xi Shu came to Guo's defense. Xi had risen to power by supporting the Jiajing Emperor during the Great Rites Controversy concerning the status of the Emperor's parents. The responsible official of the Court of Judicial Review accused both Guo and Xi and called for the case to be reviewed in a broader deliberation, a proposal supported by the censors. The Emperor disagreed and limited himself to requesting an explanation from Guo. Guo defended Zhang's innocence and pleaded for leniency.

On Guo's advice, one of Zhang's sons petitioned the Emperor for mercy for his father, and the request was submitted to officials for review. Censors in Beijing and Nanjing submitted wave of memorials to the Emperor, demanding Zhang's execution as Li Fuda and severe punishment for Guo. Guo responded by explaining to the Jiajing Emperor that he was the victim of mass hysteria and false accusations because of his earlier support for the Emperor during the Great Rites. The Emperor subsequently ordered that Guo's charge be limited to treason.

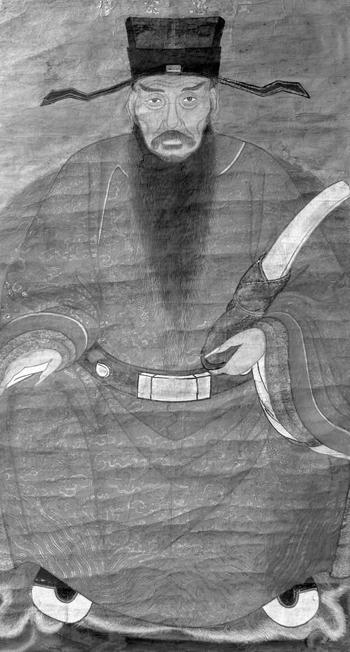
Portrait of Zhang Cong, an official who supported the Jiajing Emperor and investigated the case of Zhang Yin

The case was then transferred from Shanxi to the central authorities in Beijing. The accused and the witnesses were interrogated again. Zhang confessed to the charges, while the witnesses' testimonies were contradictory, and some of them later retracted their statements. The Emperor expressed a desire to question them personally, but Grand Secretary Yang Yiqing dissuaded him, arguing that such an action was beneath the dignity of the sovereign. Zhang Cong and Gui E, two of the Emperor's other supporters, argued that most of the officials involved were not concerned with Zhang Yin himself, but rather sought to implicate the Emperor's supporters in the Great Rites and settle old scores with them. The Emperor agreed with their assessment.

In spring 1527, the Ministry of Justice changed the charges in the case to sorcery (a crime punishable by the execution of all those involved), which convinced the Emperor of Guo's innocence and of the unreliability of the investigation. Tang Shu (唐樞), a bureau secretary in the Ministry of Justice, submitted a well-argued memorandum concluding that the guilt of Zhang Yin/Li Fuda was evident and that he should be executed. The Emperor responded by expelling Tang from the civil service. Minister of Justice Yan Yishou (顏頤壽) and his subordinates then became alarmed and began declaring that the entire matter was unclear and complicated.

In May 1527, the Emperor ordered the Embroidered Uniform Guard to arrest the Shanxi officials who had previously investigated the case, led by Ma Lu. These officials would then be brought to Beijing for interrogation. Yan Yishou argued that releasing Zhang Yin would encourage underground sectarian movements in the western region and called for the matter to be reconsidered. A confrontation was arranged between Ma and Zhang: Ma repeated his accusations against Zhang, while Zhang offered no defense. Yan then again requested a broader discussion of the case, but the Emperor accused him of involving the ruler in factional rivalry and ordered his arrest together with several other officials.

In September 1527, the Emperor appointed Zhang Cong as acting left censor-in-chief, Gui E as acting minister of justice, and Fang Xianfu as acting chief minister of the Court of Judicial Review, assigning them to establish Ma Lu's guilt for falsely identifying Zhang Yin as Li Fuda. Zhang Cong subsequently carried out a broader purge, removing around twenty censors from office. Some of these censors had opposed the Emperor during the Great Rites and allied with Grand Secretary Yang Tinghe. Zhang Cong ordered Ma Lu to be tortured until he confessed to having falsely accused Zhang Yin. The three ministers concluded that Zhang Yin was innocent and released him. Instead, officials who had demanded his execution, including Yan Yishou, were punished, ten dying as a result of beatings and forty being sent to perform military service on the frontier. Ma was assigned to a garrison in an area afflicted by malaria. (Note: In 1537, following the birth of the Emperor's son, a general amnesty was proclaimed throughout the empire, but Ma Lu was not included. He later died in exile. In 1567, he was posthumously rehabilitated by the Longqing Emperor and awarded the title of vice minister of the Court of the Imperial Stud.) The purge weakened the political influence of Yang Tinghe's supporters while strengthening that of the Emperor's supporters.

== Aftermath ==
Zhang Cong closed the case and organized the publication of a collection of documents relating to the affair, Record of the Great Case as Clarified by the Emperor (Qinming dayu lu), thereby establishing the official version of events. The collection was printed in an edition of 1,700 copies for distribution in Beijing, and sample copies were sent to the provinces as the basis for local editions. In 1569, the case was reopened on the basis of new evidence. Li Fuda's grandson was arrested, sentenced to death, and executed, Zhang Yin was identified as Li Fuda, and the officials who had been punished were rehabilitated. However, even contemporary commentators believed that both the original verdict and its later revision had primarily political aims: the condemnation and rehabilitation of the officials involved. The actual identity of Zhang Yin/Li Fuda was considered secondary in both cases.
