= Xi Shu =

Chinese official (1461–1527)

- 席書

Minister of Rites
- In office 1524–1527
- Monarch: Jiajing
- Preceded by: Wang Jun
- Succeeded by: Luo Qinshun

Personal details
- Born: 14 May 1461
- Died: 11 April 1527 (aged 65)
- Education: jinshi degree (1489)

Chinese name
- Traditional Chinese: 席書
- Simplified Chinese: 席书
Transcriptions
Standard Mandarin
- Hanyu Pinyin: Xí Shū

Xi Shu (Note: Xi Shu used the courtesy name Wentong (文同) and the art name Yuanshan (元山).) (14 May 1461 – 11 April 1527) was a Chinese scholar-official during the Ming dynasty. He served in the administration of various provinces for more than two decades. Xi sided with the Jiajing Emperor at the start of his reign during the Great Rites Controversy, and this led the Emperor to promote him to minister of rites in 1524. He held the post for nearly three years.

Before serving in the Ministry of Rites, Xi held senior administrative posts in several provinces, including Henan, Zhejiang, Shandong, Yunnan, and Fujian, where he was involved in suppressing local unrest and responding to the 1519 Prince of Ning rebellion. As minister, he dealt with the Datong mutiny and other political and administrative issues during the early Jiajing era. He was appointed grand secretary shortly before his death in 1527.

== Early life and career ==
Xi Shu was born in Suining, Sichuan province, on 14 May 1461, during China's Ming dynasty. He studied Confucianism, passed the provincial civil service examination in 1489, and in the spring of the following year passed the metropolitan and palace examinations, earning the jinshi degree. After the examinations, he was appointed magistrate of Yucheng County and later of Tancheng County, both in Shandong province. In 1498, he became a secretary in one of the bureaus of the Ministry of Works. Two years later, he became vice director of a bureau in the Ministry of Revenue.

In 1503, an earthquake severely damaged the city of Jingdong in Sichuan. Fan Ying (樊瑩), a vice minister of the Nanjing Ministry of Justice who was sent to assess the damage, interpreted the earthquake as a warning from Heaven that the Sichuan provincial administration was failing in its duties and proposed dismissing 300 senior Sichuan officials. Xi Shu protested, arguing that Heaven was more displeased by the far more serious transgressions of the central government in recent years than by the faults of local officials. (Note: Xi cited the severalfold increase in expenditure on the palaces and staff of the Forbidden City, the emperor's appointment of thousands of supernumerary officers and soldiers, the large number of temples under construction, the frequent performance of imperial sacrifices and ceremonies, and the dispatch of eunuchs to the provinces as the emperor's personal representatives.) The Hongzhi Emperor (r. 1487–1505) did not respond to his criticism.

Xi was appointed as assistant surveillance commissioner of Henan shortly after the Zhengde Emperor (r. 1505–1521) ascended the throne. In 1509, Xi was transferred to Guizhou as vice commissioner in charge of education. At the time, the philosopher and statesman Wang Yangming had been sent to Guizhou as punishment and appointed head of a postal station. Xi asked him to teach students in Guiyang, the provincial capital. In 1510, on the recommendation of Minister of Personnel Yang Yiqing, Xi was appointed administration vice commissioner of Henan. Shortly afterward, he returned home to mourn his father's death.

After returning to service, Xi became surveillance commissioner of Zhejiang. The following year, he transferred to Shandong as junior administration commissioner. He again left office to mourn his mother's death. In 1517, he returned to service as junior right administration commissioner of Yunnan, where he also suppressed a local tribal uprising. He later became senior administration commissioner of Fujian, where he was serving when the Prince of Ning rebellion erupted in neighboring Jiangxi in 1519. To suppress the rebellion, Xi assembled an army of 20,000 troops and marched into Jiangxi, but his army arrived to find that Wang Yangming had put down the rebellion.

== Great Rites Controversy ==
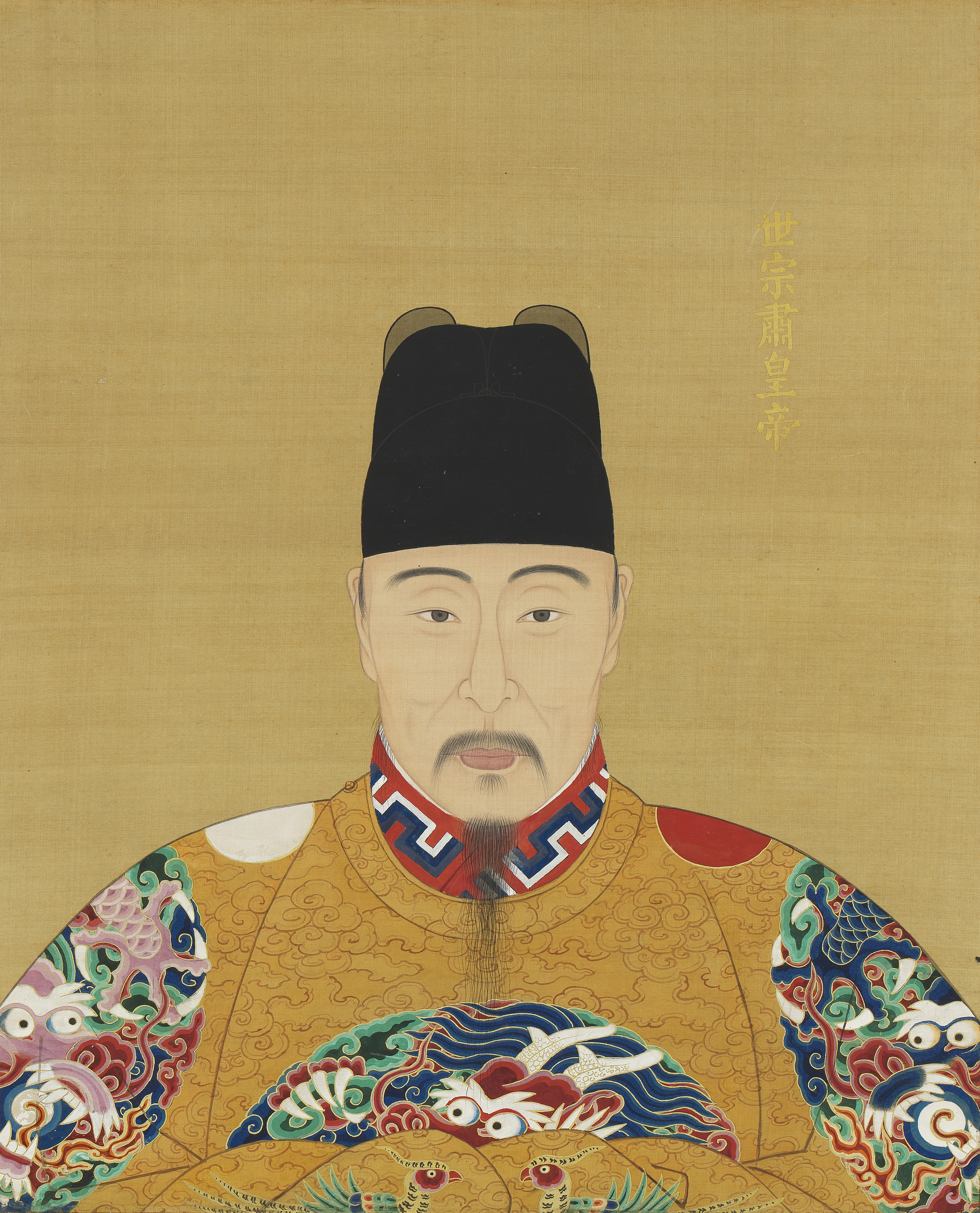
After the Jiajing Emperor (pictured) ascended the throne, Xi supported his position in the Great Rites Controversy.

In June 1521, at the start of the Jiajing Emperor's reign (r. 1521–1567), Xi was appointed as vice right censor-in-chief and grand coordinator (xunfu) of Huguang. In Huguang, he dealt with the aftermath of floods, suppressed banditry, and cracked down on corruption. In May 1522, he was transferred to serve as vice right minister of war in Nanjing. He was tasked with providing relief after widespread flooding and epidemics, along with the danger of famine, emerged in Nanjing region north of the Yangtze River. He later claimed that the timely distribution of food had saved one million lives.

From 1521 to 1524, the Great Rites Controversy unfolded over the status of the Jiajing Emperor's parents and his adoption by the Hongzhi Emperor. Led by Senior Grand Secretary Yang Tinghe and supported by the overwhelming majority of officials, the grand secretaries argued that the adoption was a necessary condition for the legitimacy and legality of the Jiajing Emperor's reign. The Emperor, however, was equally determined not to renounce his relationship with his biological parents. Xi agreed with the Emperor's position and drafted a memorial supporting him, but hesitated to submit it to the Ministry of Rites for official consideration. The memorial nevertheless came into the hands of another supporter of the Emperor, Gui E, who was serving at the Nanjing Ministry of Justice. In February 1524, Gui forwarded Xi's memorial to the Ministry of Rites together with his own commentary and a memorial by Fang Xianfu, an official in the Ministry of Personnel. The memorials pleased the Emperor but provoked fierce opposition from officials in Beijing.

After Minister of Rites Wang Jun (汪俊) resigned in April 1524, the Emperor rejected the candidates proposed by the Ministry of Personnel for the vacant post, which had given him a choice between two of Wang's deputies. He instead appointed Xi as minister of rites at his own discretion. The appointment prompted a wave of protests, with critics arguing that ministers of rites were traditionally selected only from among members of the Hanlin Academy and that, when appointing senior officials, the emperor was expected to choose from two or three candidates nominated by the Ministry of Personnel. In July 1524, Xi's opponents also accused him of corruption and incompetence in handling the famine in the Nanjing region. Xi responded by requesting a thorough investigation of the charges, arguing that he had instead prevented the famine. The Emperor subsequently sent an interdepartmental commission to investigate conditions in the affected area. In a further memorial, Xi stated that many officials were afraid to oppose the majority view in the debate over the rites, despite disagreeing with it. In August 1524, the Great Rites Controversy reached its climax with a public demonstration by hundreds of officials outside the Zuoshun Gate in the imperial palace. The Jiajing Emperor punished the protesters and subsequently secured changes to the rites and status of his parents according to his wishes.

== Minister ==
Xi only arrived in Beijing in September 1524. The month before, a frontier garrison in Datong had mutinied, killing Grand Coordinator Zhang Wenjin (張文錦) and several other commanders. Xi called for a firm stance and the uncompromising suppression of the revolt, contrary to Grand Secretary Fei Hong, who advocated conciliatory measures toward the mutineers and confirmation of the commander they had chosen. The disagreement strained Xi's relationship with Fei. The unrest ended in April 1525, when the revolt leaders were captured and executed. Earlier, in late 1524, Xi had asked the Emperor for permission to launch a campaign against corruption in the Beijing government. The Emperor refused, saying that he did not want further changes imposed by force and wished to rule in harmony in accordance with the meaning of his reign title, Jiajing ("admirable and tranquil").

In spring 1525, Xi proposed appointing Wang Yangming to the Grand Secretariat. He argued that the incumbent ministers were men of only average ability, while Wang had exceptional achievements. The Emperor rejected the proposal. In 1526, under Xi's direction, the compilation of the Veritable Records of Zhu Youyuan, the Jiajing Emperor's father, was completed. That same year, Xi defended the innocence of the Emperor's confidant, Marquis Guo Xun, in the Li Fuda case. The case concerned Zhang Yin (張寅), a Beijing pharmacist arrested in Shanxi in 1526 and accused of being Li Fuda (李福達), the alleged leader of a sectarian rebellion in Shaanxi fourteen years earlier. Zhang Yin and his sons had also associated with Guo Xun. Xi's defense of Guo led to accusations that he was supporting the alleged rebel. After a protracted series of deliberations, the Emperor entrusted the case to three of his supporters in the Great Rites Controversy: Zhang Cong, Gui E, and Fang Xianfu. They exonerated Zhang Yin. By contrast, several dozen officials who had called for Zhang's execution, most of whom had opposed the Emperor during the controversy, were punished.

== Death ==
In 1526, Xi's health deteriorated; he fell ill and became almost blind, prompting him to repeatedly request leave from office. He proposed Luo Qinshun as his successor as minister of rites. In early 1527, the Emperor approved the appointment, but Luo declined. Xi died on 11 April 1527. Shortly before his death, he was nominally appointed grand secretary. He was given the posthumous name Wenxiang (文襄).

Xi's writings were compiled in the Yuanshan wenxuan (元山文選; 'The Collected Literary Works of Yuanshan'), a collection whose present status is uncertain. He also edited Caochuanzhi (漕船志; 'Records of Grain Transport Ships'), an eight-chapter treatise on shipping and transport along the Grand Canal, which was later expanded by Zhu Jiaxiang (朱家相) and published in 1544. The work describes the shipyards, the number and types of vessels built at each yard, as well as the regulations, officials, and administrative arrangements governing the transport service.

Two of Xi's younger brothers, Xi Zhuan (席篆) and Xi Chun (席春), received the jinshi degree in 1514 and 1517 respectively. Xi Yuan rose to become a supervising secretary. Xi Chun held various positions in the provinces and central government, eventually serving as vice minister of rites and as vice minister of personnel.
