= Gui E =

Chinese official (1478–1531)

- 桂萼

Grand Secretary
- In office 1529, 1529–1531
- Monarch: Jiajing

Minister of Personnel
- In office 1527–1529
- Monarch: Jiajing
- Preceded by: Li Chengxun
- Succeeded by: Fang Xianfu

Minister of Rites
- In office 1527
- Monarch: Jiajing
- Preceded by: Wu Yipeng
- Succeeded by: Fang Xianfu

Acting Minister of Justice
- In office 1527
- Monarch: Jiajing
- Preceded by: Luo Qinshun
- Succeeded by: Li Chengxun

Personal details
- Born: 1478
- Died: 3 October 1531 (aged 52–53)
- Education: jinshi degree (1511)

Chinese name
- Chinese: 桂萼
Transcriptions
Standard Mandarin
- Hanyu Pinyin: Guì È

Gui E (Note: Gui E used the courtesy name Zishi (子實) and the art name Jianshan (見山). He was given the posthumous name Wenxiang (文襄).) (1478 – 3 October 1531) was a Chinese scholar-official and writer during the Ming dynasty. In the 1520s, he gained favor with the Jiajing Emperor by supporting him in the Great Rites Controversy. This led to Gui being appointed as chancellor of the Hanlin Academy, followed by successive appointments as minister of justice, rites, personnel, and grand secretary.

== Early life and career ==
Gui E was born in 1478 during China's Ming dynasty in An'ren County (present-day Yujiang County) in northern Jiangxi Province. He received a Confucian education and applied for the civil service examinations. He passed the provincial examinations in 1507 and the metropolitan and palace examinations in 1511, earning the rank of jinshi. He then began his career as a county magistrate, serving in Dantu, Nanzhili. However, due to his short temper, he frequently got into disputes with his superiors and was punished with caning and dismissal from service. In 1517, he was reinstated as magistrate of Wukang (武康), Zhejiang, but was dismissed again three years later after refusing to comply with the orders of a superior.

== Great Rites Controversy ==
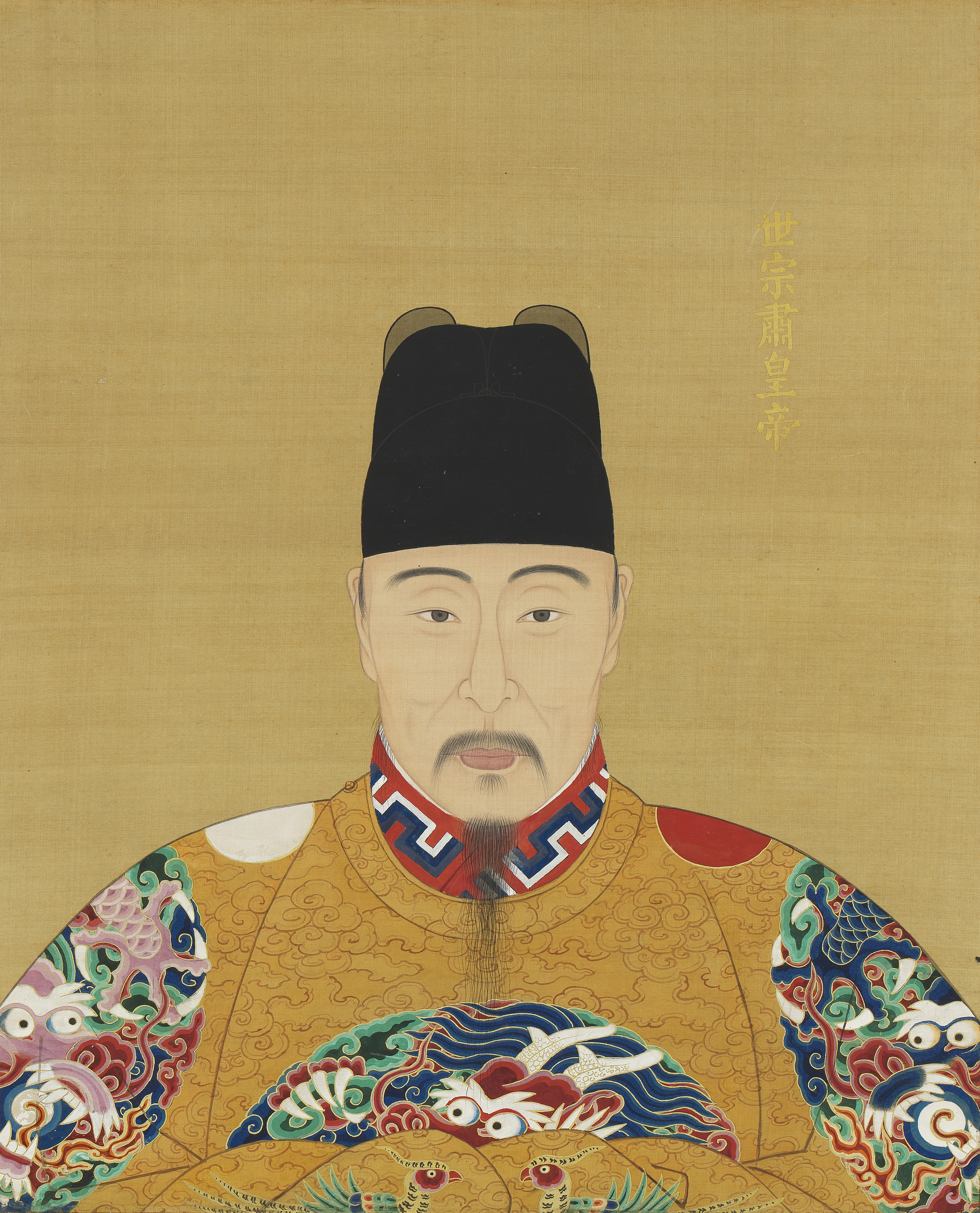
After the Jiajing Emperor (pictured) ascended the throne, Gui gained his favor by supporting him in the Great Rites Controversy.

After the accession of the Jiajing Emperor, Gui returned to civil service in 1521 as the magistrate of Cheng'an County. He was later promoted to secretary of the Nanjing Ministry of Justice. In late 1523, he submitted a memorandum to the Emperor in which he supported the Emperor's position in the Great Rites Controversy. (Note: The Great Rites Controversy was a political dispute from 1521 to 1524 between the Jiajing Emperor and much of the bureaucracy over the status of the Emperor's parents.) To demonstrate his support, he included the older memoranda of Xi Shu and Fang Xianfu with his submission. At the time, only a handful of relatively obscure officials openly supported the Emperor. Besides Gui E, these included his colleague Zhang Cong from the Nanjing Ministry of Justice, as well as Huo Tao and Xiong Jia (熊浹). The Emperor received Gui's memorandum in February 1524 and circulated it among the bureaucracy for comment. He received 82 memorials bearing the signatures of 250 Beijing officials, all of which unanimously condemned Gui's memorandum. The Emperor nevertheless summoned Gui to Beijing, where he arrived in June 1524 together with Zhang Cong. Fearing for their safety, Guo Xun, Marquis of Wuding and commander of the Beijing military forces, initially accommodated them at his residence. A loyal supporter of the Emperor, Guo also arranged for the Emperor to hold an unofficial meeting with Gui and Zhang.

In July, the Emperor appointed Gui and Zhang as chancellors of the Hanlin Academy. The appointments sparked widespread opposition, with the academy's leadership and dozens of censors protesting that careerists seeking favor with the emperor should not be appointed to high office. The Emperor, however, declared that Gui and Zhang were loyal, honest, and qualified. More than 70 supervisory secretaries and censors responded by demanding their execution for misleading the Emperor. In protest, 36 junior members of the academy submitted their resignations. After further debates and protests, the dispute culminated in August 1524 with a public demonstration by hundreds of officials outside the Zuoshun Gate in the imperial palace. The officials were beaten, arrested, and punished on the Emperor's orders. The Emperor subsequently secured approval for the titles and status of his parents, as he had desired.

== Minister ==
Gui subsequently led the Hanlin Academy. Seeking further advancement in their careers, he and Zhang Cong attacked Senior Grand Secretary Fei Hong. As a counterbalance to Fei, the pair secured the return of Yang Yiqing to the Grand Secretariat after a decade away from office. In March 1527, they succeeded in having Fei dismissed. Yang succeeded Fei as the senior grand secretary. Shortly afterward, Gui was appointed right vice minister of rites in April 1527 and, five months later, left vice minister of personnel, while continuing to lead the Hanlin Academy.

In 1525–1526, Gui E, Fei Hong, and Yang Yiqing opposed proposals by Minister of Rites Xi Shu to appoint the successful and respected statesman Wang Yangming to a high office, either as grand secretary or minister. The proposals were supported by other imperial supporters who had been elevated to high office after the Great Rites Controversy of 1524, including Fang Xianfu, Huo Tao, and Huang Wan (黃綰), but Gui E and the grand secretaries feared that Wang's appointment would reduce their influence in Beijing. Later, when Gui was tasked with drafting proposals to address unrest among indigenous chieftaincies in Guangxi, he proposed in June 1527, among other measures, appointing Wang as supreme commander (zongdu) of Guangxi and Guangdong, with the task of suppressing the unrest and establishing proper administration in the affected regions. This was likely because Wang, being assigned to the distant southwest of the empire, did not pose a threat to Gui's influence in Beijing. Zhang Cong also supported the appointment. In 1528, Gui, with the behind-the-scenes support of Yang Yiqing, criticized Wang, accusing him of planning to attack Đại Việt (present-day northern Vietnam) with the assistance of former rebels. Wang's supporters rejected the accusation. Following Wang's success in Guangxi, his supporters instead proposed, with Zhang's support, that he be appointed grand secretary. This prompted Gui and Yang to orchestrate accusations that Wang had bribed his supporters. Wang died in early 1529 while returning home. Due to Gui's influence, he did not receive the posthumous recognition normally granted to high-ranking and successful officials. (Note: In 1567, following the death of the Jiajing Emperor, the new Longqing Emperor posthumously bestowed on Wang Yangming the posthumous name Wencheng (文成).)

Gui submitted a memorandum ("Protecting the Ming [dynasty]") for review by the Emperor and the government in 1527, accusing the nuns of Baoming Temple near Beijing of various forms of misconduct. A subsequent investigation led by Huo Tao confirmed the accusations against the nuns. The Emperor ordered the closure of Baoming Temple and all other Buddhist convents for women. Fearing for their survival, the temple's leadership contacted the empress dowagers—the Jiajing Emperor's mother, Lady Jiang, and aunt, Lady Zhang—through their allied imperial eunuchs, and with their assistance secured the preservation of the temple.

In August 1527, Gui E was appointed acting minister of justice, at the same time as Zhang Cong was appointed acting left censor-in-chief and Fang Xianfu acting chief minister of the Court of Judicial Review. They were tasked with resolving the Li Fuda case, a complicated affair in which the Beijing alchemist Zhang Yin (張寅) was accused of actually being the revolt leader Li Fuda (李福達) or alternatively the sorcerer Li Wu (李午). The case also implicated Marquis Guo Xun. The three officials concluded that Zhang Yin was innocent. Several dozen officials who had supported Zhang Yin's execution, including the former minister of justice Yan Yishou (顏頤壽), were punished by dismissal from office and reassignment to military service on the frontier; some died from the effects of beatings.

After resolving the Li Fuda case, Gui was promoted to minister of rites in October 1527, while retaining his position as chancellor of the Hanlin Academy. A month later, he took charge of the Ministry of Personnel. In January 1528, he received the title of grand guardian of the heir apparent, and in June that year he was promoted to junior guardian and grand preceptor of the heir apparent. This last promotion followed the completion and publication of the Minglun dadian (Great Canon for Clarifying Human Relations), a collection of documents explaining and defending the imperial position in the Great Rites Controversy.

== Grand Secretary ==
In March 1529, Gui was appointed grand secretary and formally also minister of personnel. From early 1529, he and other officials accused Guo Xun of various offenses in early 1529, while Zhang Cong assisted Guo as much as he could. Guo was subsequently removed from command of the military forces around Beijing. In September 1529, after censors launched several waves of accusations against Zhang and Gui, the Emperor dismissed the pair from their offices. Huo Tao, however, persuaded the Emperor that the accusations were false and the result of intrigues by Grand Secretary Yang Yiqing. After lengthy deliberation, the Emperor honorably dismissed the elderly and ill Yang from office in October 1529 on account of his advanced age, while simultaneously reinstating Zhang to the Grand Secretariat. The Emperor also recalled Gui in December 1529. Gui arrived in Beijing only in May 1530 and resumed his positions as grand secretary and minister of personnel. After his dismissal, he lost much of his previous assertiveness and returned as a more inconspicuous and cautious politician.

After falling ill at the end of 1530, Gui repeatedly requested permission to retire from office. The Emperor approved his request in early February 1531. Gui then returned to his home in Jiangxi and died several months later, on 3 October 1531. He was granted the posthumous name Wenxiang (文襄).

In addition to his government service, Gui E was a prolific author, particularly known for his geographical works. He compiled a map of China and a treatise on Chinese geography. Collections of his essays, poetry, and political writings have not survived.
