= Zhang Cong =

Chinese official (1475–1539)

- 張璁
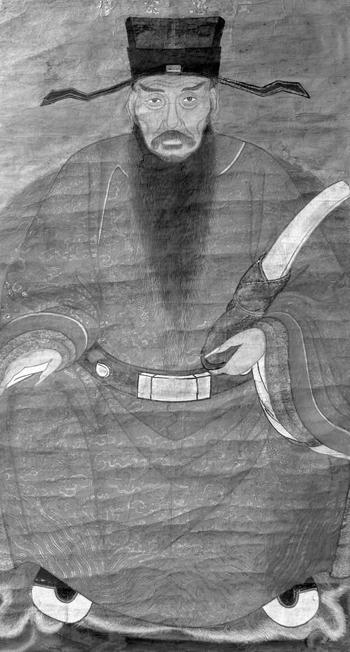

Senior Grand Secretary
- In office 1529–1531
- Monarch: Jiajing
- Preceded by: Yang Yiqing
- Succeeded by: Zhai Luan
- In office 1531–1532
- Monarch: Jiajing
- Preceded by: Zhai Luan
- Succeeded by: Fang Xianfu
- In office 1533–1535
- Monarch: Jiajing
- Preceded by: Fang Xianfu
- Succeeded by: Li Shi

Grand Secretary
- In office 1527–1531, 1531–1532, 1533–1535
- Monarch: Jiajing

Chancellor of the Hanlin Academy
- In office 1524–1527 Serving with Gui E
- Monarch: Jiajing

Personal details
- Born: 1475 Zhejiang
- Died: 24 February 1539 (aged 63–64)
- Spouse: Lady Cai
- Children: 4
- Education: jinshi degree (1521)

Chinese name
- Traditional Chinese: 張璁
- Simplified Chinese: 张璁
Transcriptions
Standard Mandarin
- Hanyu Pinyin: Zhāng Cōng

Zhang Cong (Note: Zhang Cong used the courtesy name Bingyong (秉用), later changed to Maogong (茂恭) in 1531, and the art names Luofeng (羅峰) and Luoshan (羅峰). He was given the posthumous name Wenzhong (文忠).) (1475 – 24 February 1539), later changed to Zhang Fujing (Note: simplified Chinese: 张孚敬; traditional Chinese: 張孚敬; pinyin: Zhāng Fújìng) in 1531, was a Chinese scholar-official who held high office during the early reign of the Ming emperor Jiajing. After the Jiajing Emperor ascended the throne, Zhang supported him in the Great Rites Controversy, which led to a highly successful career. From 1527 to 1535, with some interruptions, he served as grand secretary, and in 1529 he became the head of the Grand Secretariat. From the early 1530s, the Emperor paid less attention to Zhang and showed more favor to another official, Xia Yan. Zhang resigned as grand secretary in 1535, and he died four years later.

== Early life ==
Zhang Cong was born during China's Ming dynasty into a family of salt producers in Yongjia County, Zhejiang Province. His family also owned a 30 mu (1.7 ha) farm. He was the youngest of four sons born to his father, Zhang Sheng (1427–1509). In pursuit of his goal to become an official, Zhang studied Confucianism and received financial support from wealthier relatives. He successfully passed the provincial civil service examination in 1498 at the age of 23, but faced seven failures in the metropolitan examination between 1499 and 1517, despite studying at the Imperial University. It was not until he was 46 years old, in 1521, that he finally passed the metropolitan and palace examinations. Following his success, he was assigned as an observer trainee in the Court of Judicial Review. During the two decades he spent attempting to pass the metropolitan examination, Zhang demonstrated remarkable perseverance and developed considerable expertise in ritual and ceremonial matters.

== Great Rites Controversy and political rise ==
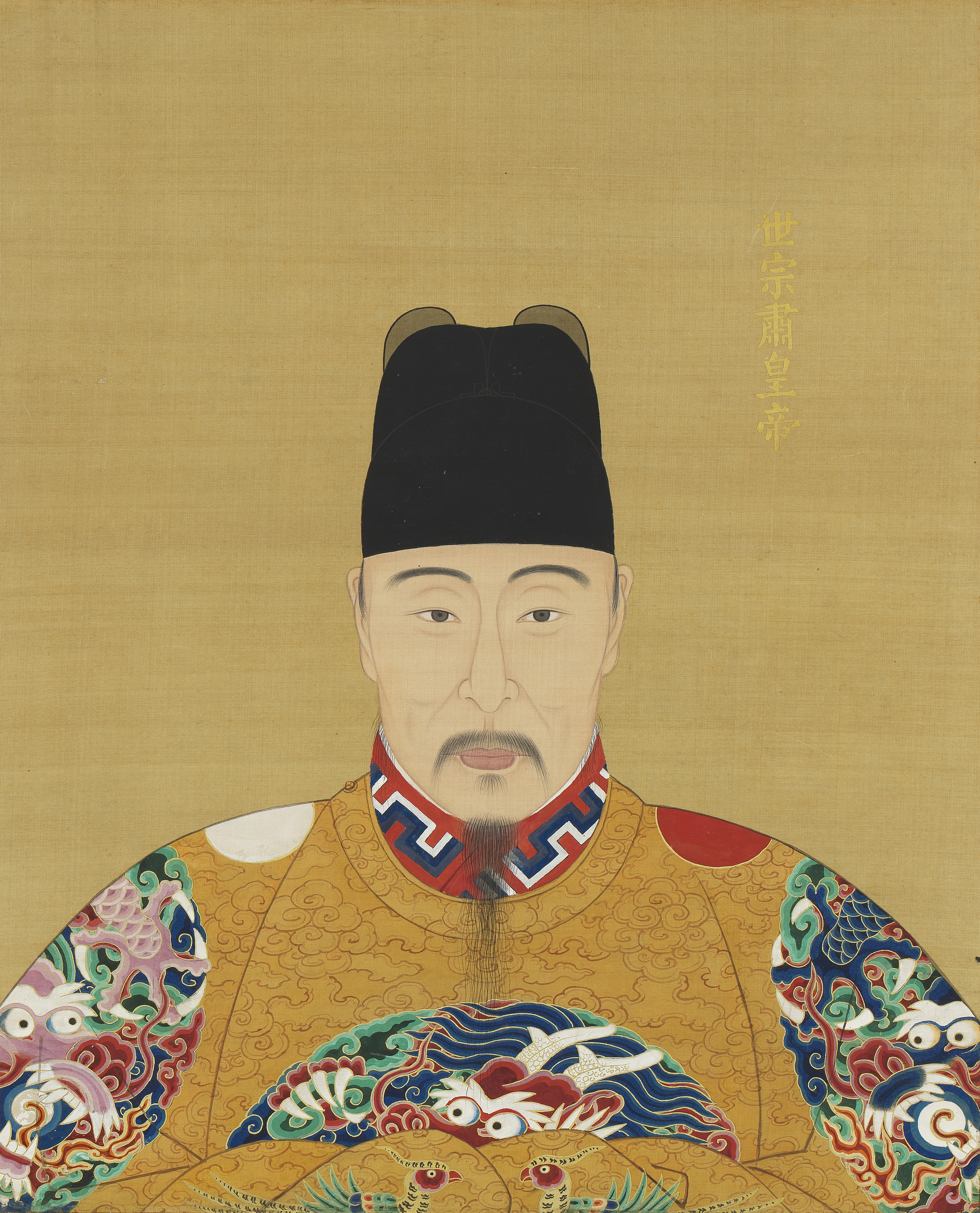
After the Jiajing Emperor (pictured) ascended the throne, Zhang supported his position in the Great Rites Controversy.

In the spring of 1521, the Jiajing Emperor ascended the throne. A dispute quickly arose between the Emperor and officials led by Grand Secretary Yang Tinghe over the status of the Emperor's parents and his adoption, known as the Great Rites Controversy. Zhang had opposed Yang's position from the outset and persuaded a friend in the Ministry of Rites to challenge the precedents Yang had cited within the ministry. The official was immediately transferred to southern China, after which Zhang remained silent for several weeks.

On 2 August 1521, Zhang drafted his first statement on the controversy, which he submitted two days later, on 4 August. He became the first official to openly support the Jiajing Emperor's position against the prevailing view. Zhang argued that the Zhengde Emperor's posthumous edict explicitly identified the Jiajing Emperor as the son of Zhu Youyuan, Prince of Xing, and that the Han and Song precedents cited by Yang were inapplicable because they concerned different circumstances. Those precedents involved childless emperors selecting successors from collateral branches during their lifetimes, after which the chosen princes were brought to the capital, formally adopted, designated as heirs, and raised as future emperors. Zhang further argued that, according to the Confucian classics, ritual was fundamentally an expression of human feelings and moral principles, reflecting the Jiajing Emperor's natural relationship with his biological parents, especially his father. He maintained that ritual should not be determined solely by precedents recorded in classical texts, but should instead accord with the natural order of human relationships and innate moral sentiment. To support his argument, Zhang cited the writings of Song scholars and statesmen, including Cheng Yi, who maintained that an eldest son could not become the son of another family.

When the Emperor presented Zhang's statement to Yang, he rejected it, stating "What would a student know about affairs of state?" The censors then accused Zhang of "deflect[ing] and disorder[ing] the ruler's mind", but the Emperor refused to punish him. On 30 October, Zhang submitted another memorandum, "Questions and Answers on the Great Rites" (Dali huowen), in which he restated and further developed his arguments. He maintained that Yang had placed the interests of the state above the moral principles governing human relationships, an approach Zhang regarded as fundamentally mistaken. Yang dispatched more than a dozen members of the Hanlin Academy to persuade Zhang to withdraw the memorandum, but they were unsuccessful and failed to prevent it from reaching the Jiajing Emperor. Unable to respond directly, Yang instead arranged for Zhang's transfer to Nanjing, about 900 km (560 mi) away, where Zhang took up the post of bureau secretary in the Nanjing Ministry of Justice in January 1522.

Officials who were willing to support the Emperor against the unified position of the grand secretaries and ministers were slow to come forward. By early 1524, six officials had rallied to the Emperor's side: Zhang, Gui E, Xi Shu, Huo Tao, Xiong Jia (熊浹), and Fang Xianfu. Except for the last, all were serving outside the capital. The Emperor summoned them to Beijing, and Zhang traveled with Gui E, a colleague from the Nanjing Ministry of Justice who had actively opposed the majority opinion in the controversy. When they arrived in Beijing in late June 1524, their views were met with vociferous disapproval from hundreds of officials. Despite this, the Emperor appointed Zhang and Gui as chancellors of the Hanlin Academy. This decision sparked a new round of protests from academics and censors, who argued that careerists should not be given high positions. Zhang faced insults and humiliation at the academy, and academics refused to work with him. The Emperor stood by his decision, declaring that both Zhang and Gui were loyal, honest, and qualified. Over seventy supervising secretaries and censors demanded that they be executed for misleading the Emperor. Many academics resigned in protest, and the dispute reached its peak when hundreds of officials staged a public demonstration outside the Zuoshun Gate in the imperial palace in August 1524. The Jiajing Emperor remained unwavering and harshly punished the participants.

The Emperor aimed to clarify and defend his stance in the Great Rites Controversy. He tasked Zhang with compiling the Minglun dadian (Great Canon for Clarifying Human Relations), which contained various arguments in support of the Emperor's position. This collection was finalized and released in June 1528.

== Minister ==
From 1524 to 1527, Zhang Cong headed the Hanlin Academy and, alongside serving as the academy's chancellor, was promoted continuously to grand supervisor of instruction (January 1526), right vice minister of war (August 1526), and then left vice minister of war. Seeking a role in directing the imperial administration, Zhang encountered opposition from Grand Secretary Fei Hong. Together with his ally Gui E, then right vice minister of rites, he launched a political campaign against Fei. To undermine Fei's position, they promoted the return of Yang Yiqing to the Grand Secretariat after decades out of office. As the senior statesman, Yang replaced Fei as senior grand secretary. In March 1527, Fei was dismissed, while Grand Secretary Shi Bao resigned at the same time.

In September 1527, Zhang Cong was appointed acting left censor-in-chief, Gui E became acting minister of justice, and Fang Xianfu was appointed acting chief minister of the Court of Judicial Review. The three were entrusted with investigating the Zhang Yin case. The case centred on Zhang Yin (張寅), a military officer from Taiyuan and a former retainer of Marquis Guo Xun. Zhang Yin had procured aphrodisiacs for Guo Xun, and his son had served as Guo's lover. In 1526, Zhang Yin was arrested and accused of being the Shaanxi revolt leader Li Fuda (李福達) as well as the sorcerer Li Wu (李午). Zhang Yin was acquitted by the local authorities. His son, who was living in Beijing, sought Guo's assistance. Guo's intervention instead led to his own accusation of conspiring with and protecting a wanted criminal. Zhang Yin surrendered to the authorities after the investigation was reopened and his sons were arrested. Following several rounds of investigation and interrogation that produced contradictory findings, the Jiajing Emperor, having lost confidence in the investigators, assigned the case to Zhang, Gui, and Fang. They concluded that Zhang Yin was innocent and ordered his release. The officials who had sought his execution, including the former minister of justice Yan Yishou (顏頤壽), were punished. Ten officials died as a result of judicial beatings, while forty others were exiled to perform military service on the frontier. The affair significantly weakened the political influence of Yang Tinghe's former supporters.

== Grand Secretary ==
In October 1527, Zhang was appointed grand secretary. He was also formally appointed minister of rites and, from 1528, minister of personnel, while retaining his post as left censor-in-chief. His appointment made him one of the Jiajing Emperor's closest advisors. Zhang was an imposing figure who was regarded as intelligent and fearless, willing to accept responsibility, and outspoken in his opposition to corruption. At the same time, he was uncompromising, jealous, and aggressive toward his political rivals. He was unpopular and had few personal allies, relying instead on the Emperor's confidence. Direct, austere, and highly learned, Zhang shared a close intellectual rapport with the Jiajing Emperor. Backed by the Emperor's trust, his political influence came to rival that of Senior Grand Secretary Yang Yiqing. As grand secretary, Zhang proposed purging the Hanlin Academy. The Jiajing Emperor agreed, but Yang opposed the measure, and the Emperor ultimately accepted Yang's view.

The political alliance between Yang Yiqing, Zhang Cong, and Gui E—who had also become a grand secretary in the spring of 1529—eventually collapsed. In September 1529, the Jiajing Emperor dismissed Zhang and Gui following accusations that they had abused their authority. The Emperor advised Zhang to reflect on his conduct and examine his conscience if he wished to return to office. As early as October 1529, however, Zhang's ally Huo Tao persuaded the Emperor that the accusations against Zhang had resulted from Yang's political manoeuvring. The Emperor responded by restoring Zhang to office and dismissing Yang, who, on Zhang's recommendation, was allowed to retire with honor. Zhang then succeeded Yang as senior grand secretary. Gui returned to the Grand Secretariat in early December 1529, less than two months later. As senior grand secretary, Zhang worked primarily with fellow grand secretaries Gui E (1529–1531) and Fang Xianfu (1532–1534), while the other grand secretaries, Li Shi (李時) and Zhai Luan, played comparatively minor political roles.

By 1528, Wang Yangming had largely restored order in the empire's southwestern provinces. Apart from bandit activity in southern Shaanxi in 1528–1529 and a mutiny at the Datong garrison in 1533–1534, China remained relatively peaceful during the late 1520s and early 1530s, while the frontiers were likewise largely stable. The Jiajing Emperor was able to focus on a comprehensive reform of state ritual, aimed at overcoming the legacy of militarism, arbitrariness, and corruption associated with the Zhengde Emperor's reign. The guiding principles of the reforms were fugu ("restoration of antiquity") and zhongxing ("midcourse revival"). The reform and codification of state ritual were intended to establish China as a model of civilization for the surrounding countries and the wider world, to reinforce order within the empire, and to strengthen the sense of Chinese cultural superiority over non-Chinese peoples. Zhang played a major role in assisting the Emperor by preparing and overseeing the implementation of the new ritual reforms, which had been proposed by the official Xia Yan in early 1530 and approved by the Emperor.

The first of the reforms was the restoration of an ancient ritual in which the empress performed the silkworm ritual. Xia Yan also proposed separating the sacrifices to Heaven and Earth. During the ensuing debate, 192 officials in the Beijing administration supported the proposal, 198 remained neutral, and 206 favored retaining the combined sacrifices, although they indicated that they would accept the change if the Emperor approved it. Only Huo Tao opposed the reform, submitting a carefully reasoned memorial and refusing to yield even after an exchange of arguments with the Emperor. He was imprisoned for a month. The reform attracted no further opposition and, after extensive theoretical preparation and practical planning, was implemented from late 1530 onward. Of the concurrent reforms concerning Confucius's titles and the forms of his veneration, only one official, the young Xu Jie, voiced opposition. He too was briefly imprisoned before being transferred to a minor post in southern China.

During discussions over the unrest in southern Shaanxi, Zhang advocated suppressing the bandits by force, whereas the Jiajing Emperor adopted a proposal by a student of the Imperial University from the affected region to withdraw the troops and seek a peaceful settlement. The negotiations failed, and the bandits were suppressed by military force. Zhang also advocated a hard-line response during discussions on how to deal with the mutiny of part of the Datong garrison in 1533–1534. Zhang adopted a more conciliatory position in the case of Zhang Yanling, the brother of Empress Dowager Zhang, who was accused of illegally seizing land and other property and of committing several murders. Although the Emperor initially demanded the death penalty, Zhang persuaded him that stripping Zhang Yanling of his titles and privileges, confiscating his property, and assigning him to military service on the frontier was a more appropriate punishment. Zhang argued that the charge of treason should be set aside because it had not been substantiated and because a conviction would have required the punishment of the entire family, including Empress Dowager Zhang, which he regarded as politically and morally unacceptable. In 1531, the Emperor approved Zhang Cong's change of personal name to Zhang Fujing because the personal name Cong (璁) had the same pronunciation as one of the characters in the Emperor's personal name. (Note: The Jiajing Emperor's personal name was Houcong (厚熜).)

According to historian Wang Shizhen (d. 1590), the restoration of the empress's silkworm ritual and the separation of the sacrifices to Heaven and Earth had originally been Zhang's proposals, which Xia Yan adopted and presented to the Emperor before Zhang could do so. Zhang subsequently came to regard Xia as a political threat. In August 1531, Zhang's attempt to falsely implicate Xia, then chancellor of the Hanlin Academy and vice minister of rites, was uncovered. The Emperor dismissed Zhang from office and forced him into retirement, while promoting Xia to minister of rites. Zhai Luan became the senior grand secretary.

At the end of 1531, the Emperor's mother, Empress Dowager Jiang, intervened on Zhang's behalf. He was recalled to Beijing and resumed his position as senior grand secretary in April 1532. By then, he no longer wielded the influence he had enjoyed in the late 1520s. After a comet appeared in the sky in early September 1532, Zhang resigned in response to what was regarded as a heavenly portent. Fang Xianfu then became senior grand secretary, serving alongside Li Shi and Zhai Luan.

In February 1533, the Jiajing Emperor again appointed Zhang as senior grand secretary, and Zhang returned to Beijing to resume office in April. He remained in office for two years before requesting retirement in May 1535 because of serious illness. The Emperor granted Zhang's request, and Li Shi succeeded him as senior grand secretary. On Li's recommendation, the Emperor reappointed Zhang's political rival Fei Hong to the Grand Secretariat. In 1536, the Emperor invited Zhang to return to Beijing, but poor health prevented him from leaving his home. He died three years later, on 24 February 1539. He was given the posthumous name Wenzhong (文忠).

== Family ==
Zhang's wife, surnamed Cai, died in 1534. They had four sons. The eldest, Zhang Xunzhi (張遜志), was noted for his devotion to his mother, caring for her during her illness and dying shortly after her. The second son, Zhang Xunye (張遜業), studied at the Imperial University, served as a drafter of central drafting office, and was later promoted to executive assistant in the seal office. He died at the age of thirty-five. The remaining two sons died young.
