= Luo Qinshun =

Chinese philosopher (1465–1547)

- 羅欽順
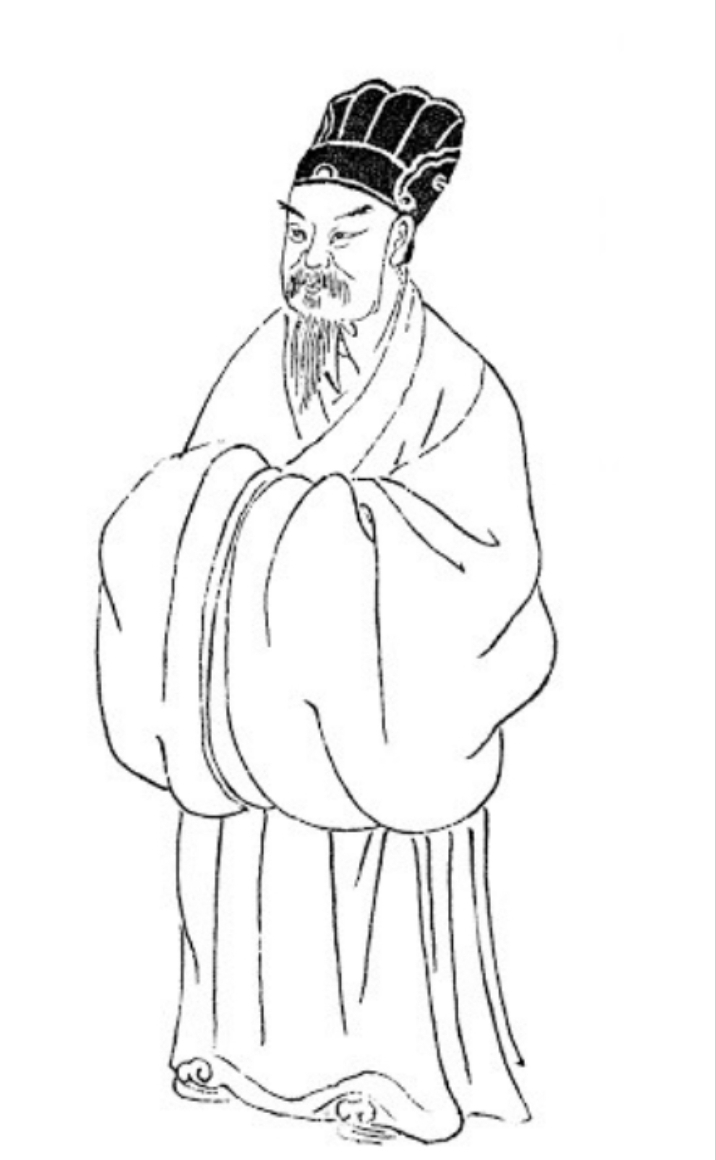
- Born: 25 December 1465; Taihe, Jiangxi
- Died: 13 May 1547 (aged 81)
- Education: jinshi degree (1493)

Chinese name
- Traditional Chinese: 羅欽順
- Simplified Chinese: 罗钦顺
Transcriptions
Standard Mandarin
- Hanyu Pinyin: Luó Qīnshùn

Luo Qinshun (Note: Luo Qinshun used the courtesy name Yunsheng (允昇) and the art name Zheng'an (整菴). He was given the posthumous name Wenzhuang (文莊).) (25 December 1465 – 13 May 1547) was a Chinese scholar-official and Neo-Confucian philosopher during the Ming dynasty. He became the most influential representative of Neo-Confucian orthodoxy during his time. While he adhered to the traditional teachings, he also introduced innovative ideas, specifically in regards to the relationship between the principles of li and qi, and the mind and nature of xin and xing. His beliefs were in direct opposition to the subjectivism found in the teachings of Wang Yangming and Chan Buddhism.

== Biography ==
Luo Qinshun was from Taihe County in Jiangxi Province, located in southern China. He dedicated himself to studying Confucian classics and successfully passed the civil service examinations. In 1492, he achieved first place in the provincial examinations, and the following year, he excelled in the highest level of the examinations, known as the palace examination, ranking third overall. He was bestowed with the title of jinshi.

After passing his examinations, he was appointed as a junior compiler at the Hanlin Academy. Later, he became the director of studies at Imperial University in Nanjing. In 1504, he returned home to take care of his father. Despite his official leave of absence expiring and his request for an extension being rejected, he chose to stay with his father. His punishment was enforced by the influential imperial eunuch Liu Jin, resulting in him losing his office and official rank. It was not until Liu's downfall in 1510 that he was able to regain his position and resume his official duties. Through several promotions, he eventually became the Nanjing minister of personnel in 1522. The following year, he resigned from his post due to his father's death. After his mourning period ended, he was offered the positions of Nanjing minister of rites and minister of personnel in Beijing, but he declined both. In 1527, he finally retired. For the remaining two decades of his life, he dedicated his time to studying and writing.

In his youth, he was drawn to Buddhism, but later he turned away from it and became the most prominent representative of the Neo-Confucian orthodoxy (Cheng–Zhu school) during his time. While he remained within the boundaries of the Cheng–Zhu school, he also creatively developed its teachings. In doing so, he opposed the idealistic currents of Confucian philosophy that were prevalent at the time, particularly those of Song thinkers Cheng Hao and Lu Xiangshan, which were most strongly represented by his contemporary, Wang Yangming. In contrast to Wang's belief that wisdom could be attained simply by realizing the goodness of one's mind/heart, he defended Zhu Xi's view that wisdom could be achieved through "expanding knowledge" by "investigating things" (gewu), which involved studying. While Wang focused on inner self-improvement by cultivating the li principle within one's mind/heart, he believed that one must also put effort into learning and taking action. He criticized his contemporaries who solely focused on their inner lives and neglected the importance of study, including both Wang's followers and the Buddhist concept of sudden enlightenment, which did not emphasize the effort required for learning and action.

He was troubled by the dualistic elements present in the teachings of the Cheng–Zhu school. In an attempt to overcome this, he utilized the concept of qi as the primary source of all things, rather than the principle of li as taught by Zhu Xi. He also rejected the dualistic view of human nature, which distinguished between the heavenly origin of li and the human origin of qi. Unlike Wang and Buddhists, who viewed desires as a negative manifestation of qi, he believed that nothing should be rejected, including moderate desires and sensory knowledge. His emphasis on the unified origin of all things contributed to the evolution of Chinese Confucianism from a moralizing perspective to a more open and empirical view of the world, which became prevalent in the early Qing period.

He summarized his philosophical views in the collection Kunzhiji (困知記; 'Knowledge acquired after painful experience'). He was also the author of the collections Zheng'an cungao (整庵存稿) and Zheng'an xugao (整庵續稿).

His contributions were recognized with the posthumous conferment of an honorary name and the title of "Grand Protector of the Heir Apparent". In 1724, a memorial tablet bearing his name was placed in the Temple of Confucius.
