= Guo Xun (Ming dynasty) =

Chinese general and statesman (1475–1542)

Guo Xun (Note: Simplified Chinese: 郭勋; traditional Chinese: 郭勛; pinyin: Guō Xūn) (1475 – 15 November 1542) was a Chinese aristocrat, military officer, statesman, and writer of the Ming dynasty. He inherited the title of Marquis of Wuding from his father, a hereditary title held by their family since the founding of the dynasty. During the early reign of the Jiajing Emperor, Guo Xun supported the Emperor in the Great Rites Controversy, a major court dispute concerning imperial succession and ritual precedence. His support earned him the Emperor's long-term favor, and he became one of the Emperor's most trusted political associates. During the 1520s and 1530s, Guo served as one of the commanders responsible for the defense of Beijing and its surrounding areas. He also supervised imperial construction projects in the capital and received repeated honors from the court. In 1539, the Emperor elevated his title to Duke of Yi. His career reflected the influence that hereditary military aristocrats could retain at the Ming court through close relations with the emperor.

Partly because of his support for the Emperor during the Great Rites, Guo was repeatedly accused of various unlawful acts, most of them involving the abuse of his position for the embezzlement of state funds. The Emperor long dismissed the accusations as manifestations of factional struggles at court. In 1541 he withdrew his support for Guo and approved his imprisonment, but refused to authorize his execution. Guo died in prison.

== Early life and career ==
Guo Xun was born in 1475 into a noble family who held the hereditary title Marquis of Wuding (武定侯). The first Marquis of Wuding was Guo Ying (郭英), who, together with his brother Guo Xing (郭興), was among the early military followers of the Hongwu Emperor, the founder of the Ming dynasty. The Hongwu Emperor appointed the Guo brothers as generals and marquises, and through several marriages the family became related to the imperial house. Guo Xun inherited the title of marquis in 1508 after the death of his father, Guo Liang (郭良; 1454–1507).

Little is known about Guo's early life. By 1512, he had become the grand defender of Guangdong and Guangxi provinces. In 1521, he was one of the commanders responsible for the security and defense of Beijing.

== Under the Jiajing Emperor ==
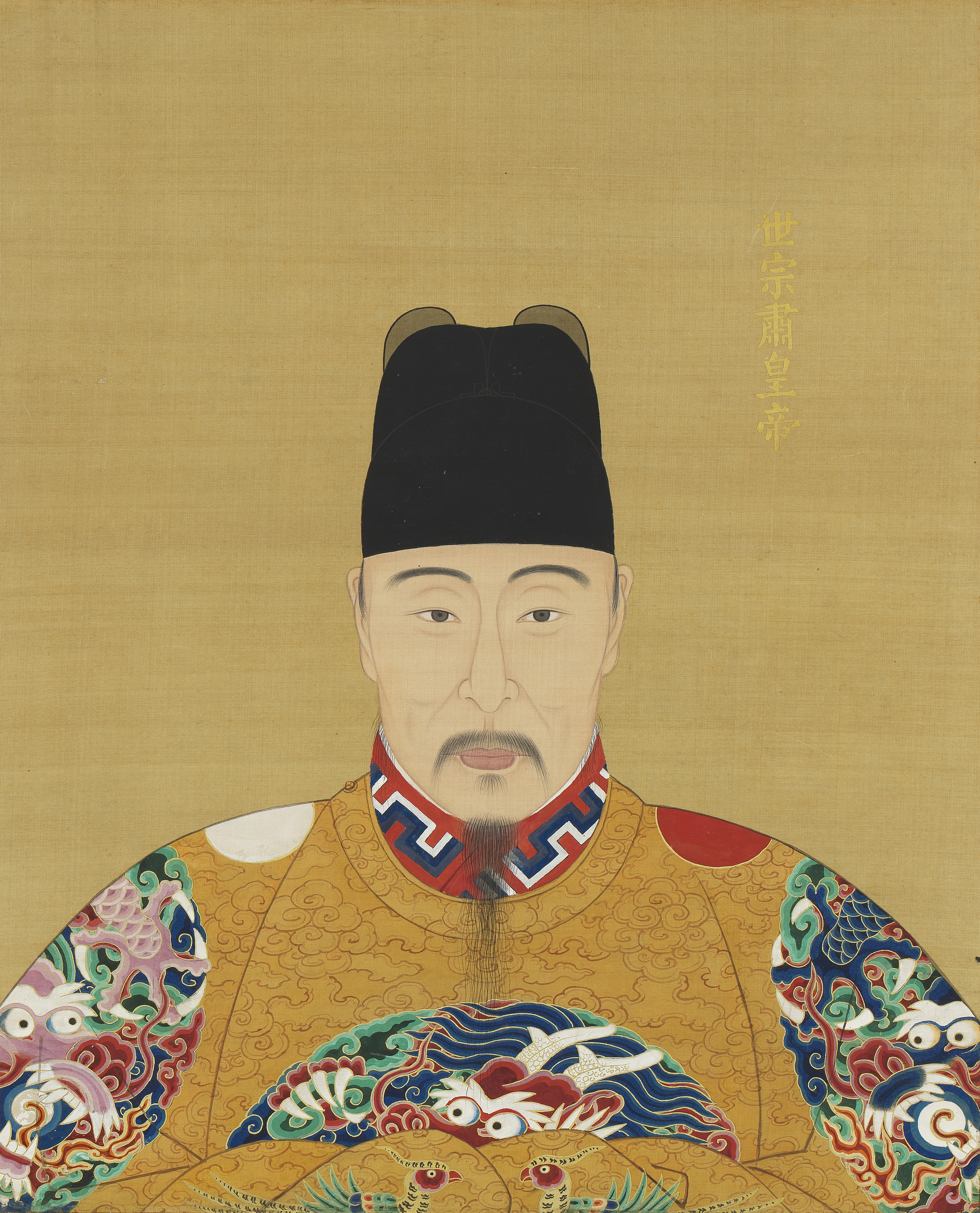
After the Jiajing Emperor (pictured) ascended the throne, Guo became the Emperor's long-term favorite by supporting him during the early years of his reign.

After the accession of the Jiajing Emperor in 1521, Guo became one of his loyal supporters. In 1522, he was appointed commander of the Three Great Camps, the Ming military forces stationed in and around Beijing. He was one of the few officials who supported the Jiajing Emperor during the Great Rites Controversy of 1521–1524, which concerned the status of the Emperor's parents. In 1524, among other actions, he ensured the security of the Emperor's supporters Zhang Cong and Gui E after their arrival in Beijing, temporarily accommodated them in his residence, and facilitated their meeting with the Emperor.

In 1526–1527, Guo became involved in the Li Fuda case. The case began in 1526 when Zhang Yin (張寅), an officer from Taiyuan (the provincial capital of Shanxi) and a former member of Guo's household, was arrested and accused of being the Shaanxi rebel Li Fuda (李福達) as well as the sorcerer Li Wu (李午). Zhang had previously served Guo by obtaining aphrodisiacs for him and had provided his son as a sexual companion to the marquis. The local authorities acquitted Zhang and instead punished those who had reported him. Zhang's son, who was living in Beijing, sought Guo's assistance. Guo intervened on behalf of the accused and wrote to Ma Lu (馬錄), the regional inspector of Shanxi, asking him to drop the case. Ma refused the attempted bribe and instead accused Guo of treason for protecting a rebel wanted for mass murder, presenting Guo's letter as evidence. Zhang surrendered himself to the authorities after they arrested his sons.

Later, Guo was accused of embezzling large amounts of silver and grain intended for the Beijing garrison. He defended himself before the Emperor, claiming that he was the target of false accusations because of his support for the Emperor during the Great Rites. The Emperor subsequently ordered that the charges be limited to the issue of treason. In the spring of 1527, the Ministry of Justice changed the accusation in the case to sorcery, which convinced the Emperor of Guo's innocence and the unreliability of the investigation.

After another round of inquiries produced contradictory results, the Emperor transferred the case in September 1527 to Zhang Cong, Gui E, and Fang Xianfu, who had recently been appointed as left censor-in-chief, minister of justice, and chief minister of the Court of Judicial Review, respectively. The three concluded that Zhang Yin was innocent and released him. Instead, several dozen officials who had previously demanded his execution were punished, including the former minister of justice Yan Yishou (顏頤壽). The outcome further weakened the position of the Emperor's opponents in the Great Rites Controversy.

As a close confidant of the Emperor, Guo participated with him in both Taoist and official Confucian rituals. He was among the Emperor's favored officials who offered Taoist prayers in the qingci (青詞) style. (Note: Qingci was a literary form of Taoist prayers and praises offered to Taoist gods, traditionally written on black paper.) After 1533, when the Emperor ceased personally attending state rituals, including sacrifices to Heaven, Earth, the Sun, the Moon, and other deities, Guo represented him at these ceremonies. He received numerous rewards and honors, including the honorary titles of Left Pillar of the State in 1536 and grand tutor in 1538. Guo petitioned for the addition of his ancestor Guo Ying's spirit tablet to the Imperial Ancestral Temple, and the Emperor approved the request. In 1539, the Emperor elevated Marquis Guo Xun to Duke of Yi (翊國公), and Guo accompanied him on his journey to his native Anlu.

During the debate over the Đại Việt (present-day northern Vietnam question in 1537–1541, Guo advocated launching an invasion of Đại Việt, overthrowing the Mạc dynasty, which controlled most of the country, and restoring a legitimate ruler from the Lê dynasty. Because of the difficulties and costs involved, however, the invasion proposal was abandoned, and the disputes with Đại Việt were ultimately resolved through diplomatic means. Guo, along with several other high-ranking officials, was rewarded for his constructive contributions to the discussions on Đại Việt.

Guo was also active in literary pursuits. In his historical work Sanjia shidian (三家世典), he presented the histories of the families of three generals who contributed to the founding of the Ming dynasty: Xu Da, Mu Ying, and Guo Ying. He is also credited with the authorship of the Yinglie zhuan (英烈傳), a novel recounting the founding of the Ming dynasty. Guo printed editions of the famous novels Water Margin and Romance of the Three Kingdoms, which became known as the Wuding edition (武定本). In the case of Water Margin, the Wuding edition, together with an edition printed by the Censorate, (Note: The Censorate also published several other works by Guo Xun, as well as works by its own officials.) represents one of the earliest known printed versions of the novel. Guo also published a collection of qu lyrics from zaju plays, several collections of Tang prose and poetry, and a rhyming dictionary. His calligraphy was likewise highly regarded.

In 1540, Guo recommended the Taoist adept Duan Chaoyong (段朝用) to the Emperor. Duan claimed that he could prepare an elixir of life and transform ordinary metals into silver and gold. He presented the Emperor with silver vessels supposedly capable of prolonging life, as well as 10,000 liang (approximately 370 kg) of silver. The Emperor initially received him with enthusiasm, but Duan was later exposed as a fraud and was executed in March 1543.

== Downfall ==
Guo had a long-standing rivalry with the official Xia Yan, who became grand secretary in 1536. Both men competed for the Emperor's favor, and Xia secretly encouraged accusations against Guo for various illegal activities. In 1541, the censors again accused Guo of numerous crimes, including using state funds and labor allocated for government construction projects and the state transportation system for his private purposes, illegally seizing land and property, engaging in illicit commercial activities, and oppressing the populace. A subsequent investigation revealed that high-ranking officials owned around a thousand shops in Beijing and its surrounding areas, with Guo owning more of them than anyone else. It also found that Guo had imprisoned and tortured people with whom he was in disputes, even though they had committed no legal offenses. Guo defended himself by arguing that the land and shops he owned were legally leased out, and that businesses operated in his name were managed by agents whose activities he neither supervised nor controlled. The Emperor initially showed little inclination to punish him. However, in August 1541, Guo refused an order to investigate conditions in the Beijing garrison because he felt insulted by the appointment of two civilian officials as his assistants. Guo's refusal angered the Emperor, who ordered Guo's imprisonment when another accusation was submitted in October 1541. Guo died in prison on 15 November 1542.

Eight years later, Guo Xun's son Guo Shouqian (郭守乾) petitioned the Emperor for the restoration of the title Marquis of Wuding. The Emperor approved the request. Guo Shouqian's descendants continued to hold the title until 1643, when the rebel army of Li Zicheng killed the last marquis Guo Peimin (郭培民).
