= Great Rites Controversy =

16th-century political dispute in Ming China

The Great Rites Controversy (Note: Simplified Chinese: 大礼议; traditional Chinese: 大禮議; pinyin: Dàlǐyì) was a political dispute in Ming China from 1521 to 1524 between the Jiajing Emperor and the majority of officials, led by Senior Grand Secretary Yang Tinghe, concerning the status of the Emperor's parents and the question of his adoption by the Hongzhi Emperor.

In 1521, the childless Zhengde Emperor died and was succeeded by his thirteen-year-old cousin, the Jiajing Emperor. The new emperor's father, Zhu Youyuan (d. 1519), was a younger half-brother of the Hongzhi Emperor, but because Zhu Youyuan's mother was only a concubine, neither he nor his son had a direct claim to the throne. Yang Tinghe and the other grand secretaries, supported by most officials, proposed that the Jiajing Emperor be adopted by the Hongzhi Emperor, making him the younger brother of the Zhengde Emperor and legitimizing his succession. This would, however, reduce his biological parents to the status of uncle and aunt. Deeply devoted to his parents, the young emperor strongly rejected this arrangement. The dispute between the Emperor and the bureaucracy became known as the Great Rites Controversy. Yang Tinghe attempted to enforce official unity by sending some supporters of the Emperor's position to distant provinces. After prolonged debates, a compromise was reached in 1521–1522: the Emperor's biological parents and grandmother were granted imperial titles, while the Jiajing Emperor formally recognized the Hongzhi Emperor as his adoptive father.

The Emperor was dissatisfied with the compromise and sought to further elevate the titles of his parents in 1522–1523. The officials rejected his demands, arguing that the distinction between the main imperial line and his birth line had to be maintained. In early 1524, some officials began supporting the Emperor's position and reopened the debate. From March onward, the Emperor's patience with opposition diminished, and he began arresting and dismissing officials who challenged him. That same month, Yang resigned due to illness, allowing the Emperor's supporters to gain greater influence and occupy key positions. The controversy continued to intensify. In August 1524, more than two hundred officials staged a protest before the Zuoshun Gate in the imperial palace. The demonstration ended with their arrest; seventeen officials died from beatings, while the others were punished. Afterwards, the Emperor's supporters occupied high offices and the titles and status of his parents were revised according to his wishes.

== Selection of the new emperor ==
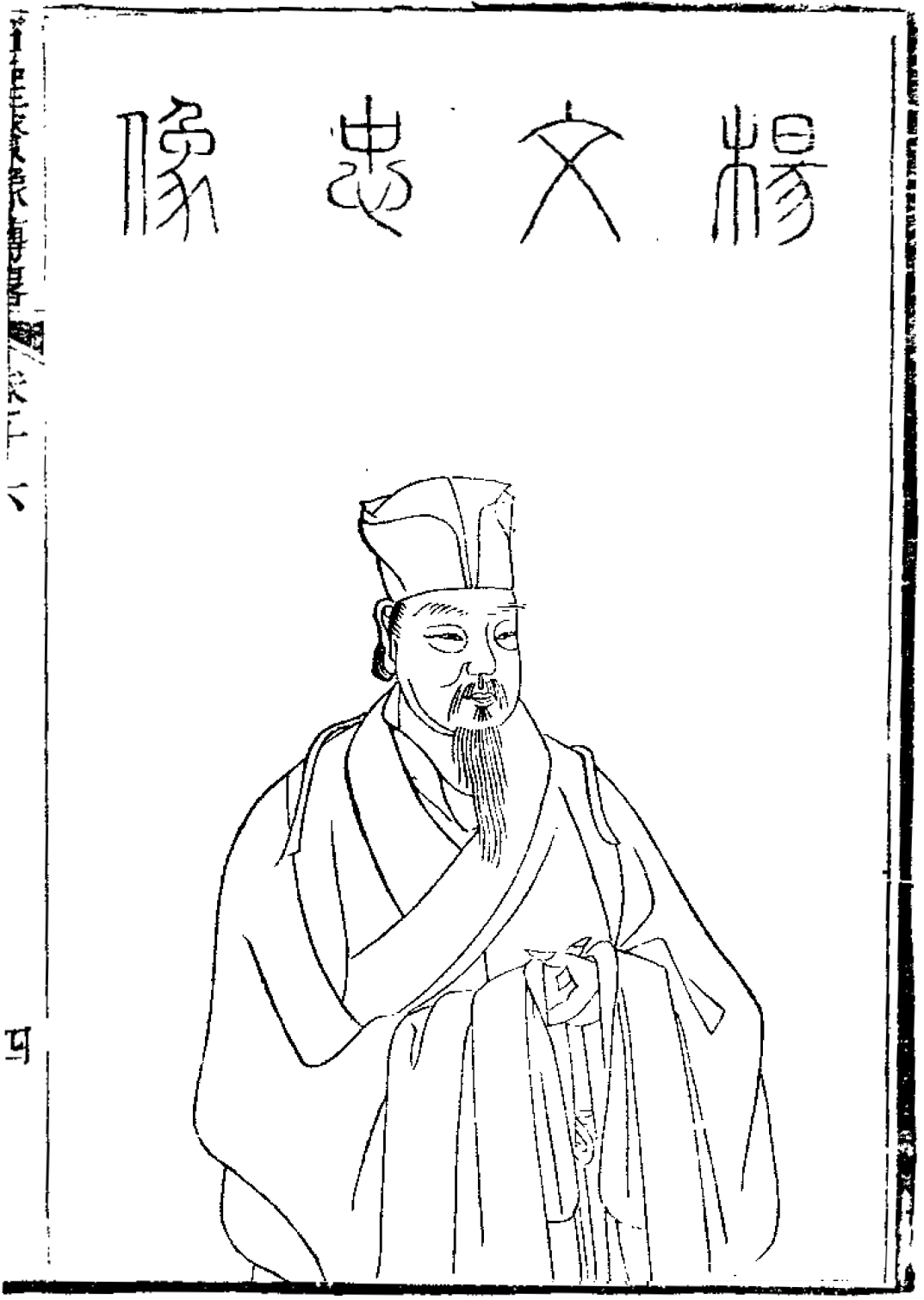
Illustration of Yang Tinghe

In 1505, the Hongzhi Emperor, the 10th emperor of China's Ming dynasty, died and his only son succeeded him as the Zhengde Emperor. The Zhengde Emperor died childless on 20 April 1521. His closest male relative, his young cousin Zhu Houcong (born 1507), was chosen as the next emperor. Zhu Houcong was the only surviving son of Zhu Youyuan, Prince of Xing (died 1519), the younger brother of the Hongzhi Emperor. Zhu Houcong's installation was recommended by Grand Secretary Yang Tinghe and approved by the other grand secretaries, the leading imperial eunuchs, and Empress Dowager Zhang, the Zhengde Emperor's mother.

Zhu Houcong lived in his princely fief of Anlu, Huguang, in central China, in central China. On the day of the Zhengde Emperor's death, the grand secretaries drafted an edict signed by the Empress Dowager, calling on the young prince to come to Beijing and ascend the throne, no difficulties being expected with him. Zhu Houcong formally received the delegation delivering the Empress Dowager's edict in Anlu, agreed to accept the throne, and departed for Beijing on 7 May 1521.

The selection of Zhu Houcong as successor was problematic from the perspective of the Ming succession rules. According to the succession laws, only sons of the empress were eligible to inherit the throne, and an attempt to place a descendant of a concubine on the throne was punishable by death. Zhu Houcong's father, Zhu Youyuan, was the son of a concubine and therefore had no right of succession. The Hongzhi Emperor's other brothers were also sons of concubines, and therefore neither they nor their descendants were eligible for the throne. The closest legitimate successor was Zhu Houyao (朱厚燿; 1501–1537), Prince of Chong, a grandson of the Hongzhi Emperor's uncle Zhu Jianze (朱見澤; 1455–1505).

To resolve the problem of Zhu Houcong's succession rights, Yang Tinghe decided to circumvent the issue by having Zhu Houcong adopted by the Hongzhi Emperor, allowing him to become ruler as the younger brother of the deceased Zhengde Emperor. The adoption would have preserved the continuity of the imperial line and granted legitimacy and legality to Zhu Houcong's accession. The idea of adoption was supported by the other grand secretaries, ministers, and officials. Yang made a serious mistake that would later prove costly. In the Empress Dowager's edict summoning Zhu Houcong to the throne, he was addressed as the Prince of Xing and was called upon to come to Beijing and ascend the throne, without any mention that he was to inherit the throne as the adopted son of the Hongzhi Emperor.

Simplified Ming imperial lineage during the Great Rites

Emperor Yingzong | Empress Xiaosu
Lady Shao | Chenghua Emperor r. 1464–1487 | Zhu Jianze (Prince Jian of Chong)
Zhu Youyuan (Prince of Xing) | Lady Jiang | Hongzhi Emperor r. 1487–1505 | Empress Zhang | Zhu Youbin (Prince Duan of Yi) | Zhu Youmi (Prince Jing of Chong)
Jiajing Emperor r. 1521–1567 | Zhengde Emperor r. 1505–1521 | Zhu Houxuan (Prince of Chongren) | Zhu Houyao (Prince of Chong)

== Debate before Jiajing's accession ==
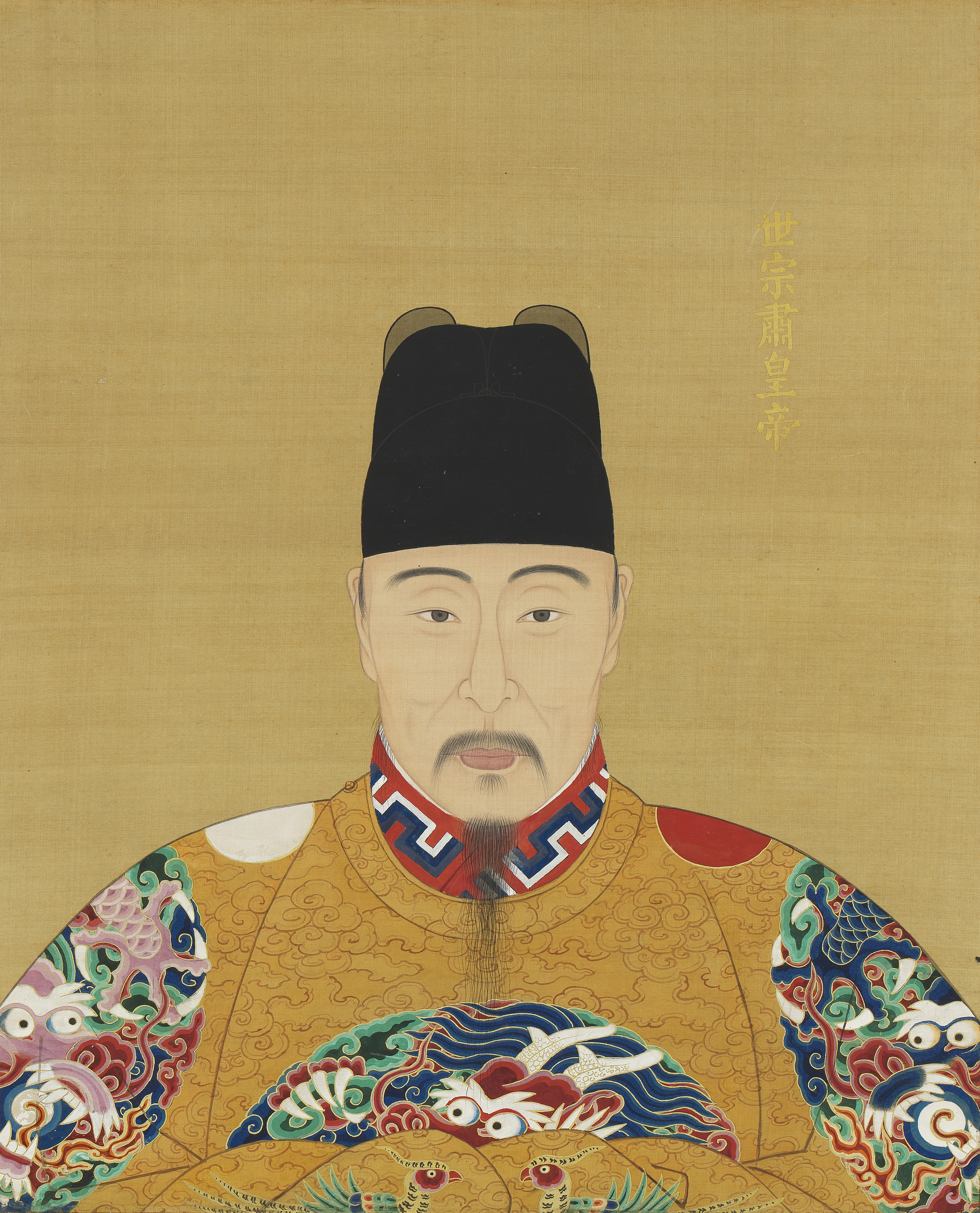
Zhu Houcong as the Jiajing Emperor

On 26 May 1521, officials of the Ministry of Rites informed Zhu Houcong and his entourage in Liangxiang, about 30 km south of Beijing, of the plans for the next stage of the proceedings. The first difficulties then emerged—concerning the era name of the new emperor's reign (which was to begin from the New Year, although its name was to be announced upon his accession to the throne) and Zhu Houcong's status. Zhu Houcong demanded entry into the city through the main gate, as the designated emperor, rather than through a side gate as a prince or heir apparent. He refused to yield even when Yang Tinghe personally came to the outskirts of Beijing to urge him to do so. The grand secretaries, along with the other officials of the central government, had assumed that the new emperor would ascend the throne as the younger brother of the Zhengde Emperor. Therefore, the Ministry of Rites planned for Zhu Houcong to proceed as if he were the heir apparent. Zhu Houcong and his advisers rejected these arrangements. They argued that the Empress Dowager's edict contained no mention that he was an heir apparent, nor that he was receiving the imperial title as the son of the Hongzhi Emperor and the brother of the Zhengde Emperor. The edict simply summoned him to ascend the throne and assume the imperial title. Under time pressure, the officials yielded to Zhu Houcong's demands, allowing him to enter the city with imperial honors on the following day, 27 May. On the same day, Zhu Houcong ceremonially ascended the throne as the Jiajing Emperor.

Regarding the choice of the reign era name, the grand secretaries initially proposed "Shaozhi" (紹治; 'Continuation of proper governance'). The phrase Shaozhi was probably derived from a passage in the court's appeal urging the Emperor to accept the throne, which stated that good governance would result from the emperor following the policies and rituals established by the Hongwu Emperor (r. 1368–1398), the founder of the dynasty. Thus, it expressed a program of political continuity. It could also be interpreted as "continuing the line of the Hongzhi Emperor", and therefore carried a reference to the new emperor's adoption by the Hongzhi Emperor. The Emperor rejected the proposed era name and chose his own, "Jiajing" (嘉靖). Its meaning is usually rendered as "admirable and tranquil" or "splendid peace". The phrase appears in a passage from the Book of Documents, in which the Duke of Zhou admonishes the young King Cheng and praises the Shang king Wu Ding, who had governed the realm with "excellent tranquility". Wu Ding was praised for restoring the prestige of the declining Shang dynasty, not through force, but through the influence of his virtue. The phrase Jiajing therefore represented a criticism of the condition of the state and of the Zhengde Emperor's reign, as well as a declaration of a policy of reform and restoration. In the same admonition, King Wen of Zhou, the virtuous father of the exemplary founding Zhou king Wu, is contrasted with the inept final Shang king Zhou. The Jiajing Emperor saw a parallel between the figures of the three kings and his own circumstances: the inept Zhengde Emperor, his virtuous father Zhu Youyuan, and himself. He therefore believed that his accession was not owed to grand secretaries, ministers, or the Empress Dowager, but rather to the virtue of his father recognized by Heaven. This belief shaped his filial devotion toward his biological parents and his rejection of adoption by the Hongzhi Emperor.

== Dispute over Jiajing's adoption and the status of his parents ==
After his accession to the throne, the Jiajing Emperor ordered the Ministry of Rites to submit a proposal concerning the status of his mother and his deceased father. Yang Tinghe responded by issuing instructions on how the matter should be handled, citing precedents from the accessions of emperors from collateral branches of the imperial family who had been adopted by childless emperors, namely Emperor Ai of Han in the 1st century BC and Emperor Yingzong of Song in the 11th century. He stated that anyone who disagreed with his decision would face dismissal from office. (Note: American historian James Geiss, in The Cambridge History of China, Volume 7: The Ming Dynasty, 1368–1644, Part 1, states that Yang threatened to execute those who opposed his decision. This claim originated from the official History of Ming, compiled in the 18th century. Aaron Throness argues that an alternative tradition, according to which Yang threatened dismissal from office rather than execution, is more plausible and consistent with Yang's actual conduct.)

Under this principle of adoption, since the Jiajing Emperor had been adopted by the Hongzhi Emperor, the Hongzhi Emperor and Empress Dowager Zhang would become the Jiajing Emperor's adoptive parents, while the new emperor's biological parents, Zhu Youyuan and Lady Jiang, would be reduced in status to that of his uncle and aunt. The same decision had been made in the case of Emperor Yingzong of Song, when such eminent authorities as Sima Guang, Cheng Yi, and Zhu Xi agreed that the principle and purpose of adoption was the transfer of the adopted person into a new family, thereby severing the adopted person's ties with his biological parents. Adoption was also required by Chinese family law, under which it was considered self-evident that, in the absence of a direct heir, succession and inheritance depended on adoption. Therefore, Yang instructed the ministry that the Hongzhi Emperor should receive the posthumous title "Deceased Imperial Father" (皇考), Zhu Youyuan should be titled "Deceased Imperial Uncle and Great Prince of Xing" (皇叔考興獻大王), and Lady Jiang should be titled "Imperial Aunt and Great Consort of Xing" (皇叔母興國大妃). The Emperor himself was to refer to Zhu Youyuan and Lady Jiang as his "imperial uncle" and "imperial aunt". To ensure that proper sacrifices could be offered to Zhu Youyuan as his father, Zhu Houxuan (朱厚炫; 1500–1577), Prince of Chongren, was to be adopted as Zhu Youyuan's son and would thereby inherit the title of Prince of Xing.

For Yang and his supporters, the preservation of the direct line of succession and the rituals confirming and honoring the (adoptive) imperial father were matters of paramount importance for the state, and therefore far more significant than the familial question of honoring the Jiajing Emperor's biological father. If the direct line of succession had been considered ended with the Zhengde Emperor and the Jiajing Emperor had succeeded as the representative of a new line, it would have created an exceptionally serious precedent, opening the way for other collateral branches of the imperial family to claim the throne. By the late 15th century, the imperial clan had grown to more than two thousand members. Yang, however, made an error by failing to state in the edict summoning the Jiajing Emperor to the throne that his right of succession derived from his adoption by the Hongzhi Emperor. Yang's second major mistake was misjudging the Emperor by failing to take into account the depth and strength of the Jiajing Emperor's feelings toward his father, who had died only recently, in 1519. The Emperor rejected the adoption arrangement and firmly refused to declare his parents as his uncle and aunt.

On 11 June 1521, the Ministry of Rites submitted to the Emperor a memorandum approved at an assembly of more than sixty responsible officials, which established the arrangement of titles and relationships between the Emperor and his relatives according to Yang's proposal. The Emperor returned the memorandum and ordered that the matter be reconsidered. Yang attempted to persuade the leading imperial eunuchs of the correctness of the adoption arrangement. Their representatives told him that, regardless of how persuasive his arguments might be, they would always stand by their emperor. The Emperor also sought broader support. In June 1521, he made the proper manner of honoring deceased biological parents the subject of the palace examinations for officials. His attempt failed: none of the candidates in their essays dared to challenge Yang's position. In the following weeks, the Ministry of Rites repeatedly urged the Emperor to formally approve the memorandum on adoption and the related rituals, but he refused to give his consent and called for more careful consideration of the issue.

== Early formation of the pro-Jiajing faction ==
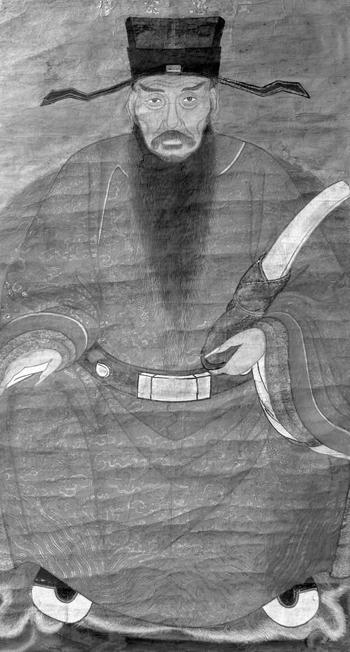
Zhang Cong supported the Jiajing Emperor's position, and the Emperor later appointed him as grand secretary.

In August 1521, the first official to support the Emperor's position was Zhang Cong, a newly graduated civil service examination candidate, who submitted a memorandum defending the Emperor's stance for consideration. He argued that the succession decree appointing the Emperor named him as the son of the Prince of Xing, and that the precedents selected by Yang Tinghe as binding could not be applied because they concerned different circumstances. In those cases, childless emperors, while still alive, had chosen successors from collateral branches of the imperial family. These successors were brought to the capital, formally adopted, and raised as future emperors. Zhang emphasized that, according to the classics, rituals were essentially expressions of human feelings, and in this case they reflected the Jiajing Emperor's relationship with his biological parents, especially his father. Regarding the arguments based on the views of the Song statesmen and philosophers, he pointed out that their writings also contained arguments against the Emperor's adoption. For example, Cheng Yi had stated that the eldest son could not become the son of another person.

Yang rejected Zhang's memorandum, arguing that an inexperienced student did not understand matters of state. The censors then quickly accused Zhang of "misleading the ruler", but the Emperor rejected their request for punishment. At a personal meeting, the Emperor presented his proposed titles for his parents to the grand secretaries. They rejected his proposal in a written response, repeating their previous arguments and adding that even the greatest rulers, Shun and Yu, had not honored their parents in such a manner. The issue, however, continued to be debated within the Beijing government offices, and several voices emerged expressing sympathy for the Emperor's position. The Emperor again asked the grand secretaries to support his proposals, but they returned his orders unopened. In turn, the Emperor withheld the grand secretaries' submissions rather than forwarding them to the government offices for comment, as was customary practice.

In September 1521, the Emperor gained the support of Zhu Yousi (朱祐楒; d. 1555), Prince of Zaoyang, a member of the imperial family who lived in the northern part of Huguang. His interpretation was close to Zhang Cong's views. On 30 October, Zhang submitted another treatise, "Questions and Answers on the Great Rites" (Dali huowen), in which he repeated and refined his arguments. Among other points, he emphasized that Yang based his arguments on the interests of the state while disregarding the moral principles governing human relationships, which he considered erroneous. He also argued, citing ancient precedents, that succession to the throne was different from succession within a family. Although this distinction had been valid in ancient times, when the position of ruler was regarded by people more as an office than as a hereditary status, it was an obvious anachronism in the Ming period. Yang then arranged for Zhang's promotion to bureau secretary in the Nanjing Ministry of Justice, some 900 km from Beijing, thereby isolating him from political affairs in the capital. This, however, did not stop the debate. After an extended exchange of views with Minister of Rites Mao Cheng (毛澄), Zhang submitted on 6 November 1521 a memorandum supporting the Emperor, as did Huo Tao, who had served as a junior secretary in the Ministry of War since September 1521. In his analysis, Huo also placed the bonds between parents and children, derived from the cosmic order of the world and natural human morality, above mere considerations of state interest. He argued that the emperor should honor his parents, properly respect previous emperors and empresses, and continue the line of succession established by the Zhengde Emperor.

== Debate over the status of Jiajing's mother and the compromise settlement ==
On 24 October 1521, the Jiajing Emperor's mother, Lady Jiang, arrived at Tongzhou, near Beijing. The Ministry of Rites arranged for her entry into Beijing and the Forbidden City with the status of a princely consort, while the Emperor demanded that she be received as the imperial mother, even though she had not been granted the rank of empress dowager and was in fact only a prince's consort. Lady Jiang herself refused to enter the capital as merely a prince's widow, declaring that she would rather return to Anlu than accept such treatment. The distressed emperor, pressured to address her as his aunt, announced that he would rather abdicate and return with her to Anlu. The Emperor's demand that his mother be received with imperial honors provoked massive protests from officials. The Emperor therefore sent his mother imperial robes but asked her to remain in Tongzhou. Over the next several days, Minister of Rites Mao Cheng proposed an edict granting imperial titles to the Emperor's parents and his grandmother, Lady Shao. The edict was issued under the Empress Dowager's seal. On 2 November 1521, Lady Jiang entered Beijing and the Forbidden City with imperial honors, where she was received by the Jiajing Emperor. However, Empress Dowager Zhang refused to recognize Lady Jiang's imperial status and continued to treat her as an ordinary princely consort, and in return the Emperor and his mother sought to humiliate Empress Dowager Zhang.

Despite the elevation of his parents to imperial status, the Emperor remained dissatisfied. At the beginning of 1522, he requested that his mother's title be further elevated by adding the character huang (皇) to her title, meaning "empress" or "august". The grand secretaries rejected his request, arguing on the basis of precedent that this character could only be used in the titles of emperors and empresses who had actually ruled, and that a distinction had to be maintained between Lady Jiang and Lady Zhang, who, despite both holding the title of empress dowager, were not equal in status. In the subsequent exchange of letters between the Emperor and the grand secretaries, both sides expressed understanding of the other's feelings, but otherwise remained firm in their positions. After the Emperor's request was circulated for official comments, the grand secretaries received the support of about thirty officials. The Emperor responded by claiming that he had the support of Empress Dowager Zhang, but this was followed by an even larger wave of opposition from officials in both Beijing and Nanjing, with renewed accusations that the Emperor had been misled by his supporters Zhang Cong and Huo Tao.

Yang Tinghe, leading the officials, continued to firmly refuse to yield on the issue of the Jiajing Emperor's adoption by the Hongzhi Emperor. On 7 February, the imperial New Year sacrifices to Heaven and Earth were held. On the same day, however, a fire destroyed three buildings adjacent to Empress Dowager Zhang's palace. The grand secretaries immediately responded with a letter to the Emperor, interpreting the event as a manifestation of Heaven's and the imperial ancestors' disapproval of the changes made to the titles of the Jiajing Emperor's parents. This interpretation gained broad support among the ministries and other government offices. The Jiajing Emperor was deeply religious, and the apparent anger of the higher powers shook him so greatly that he not only withdrew his request to change his parents' titles, but also acknowledged the Hongzhi Emperor as the "Deceased Imperial Father" and Empress Dowager Zhang as the "Sagely Mother" (聖母), thereby abandoning his opposition to his adoption by them. At the same time, the characters bensheng (本生), meaning "biological" or "by birth", were added to the titles of Zhu Youyuan and Empress Dowager Jiang.

== Temporary lull in the dispute ==
After February 1522, the Great Rites Controversy subsided for a time, allowing Yang Tinghe, as the leader of the bureaucracy, to fully concentrate on his political priorities. He sought to improve the efficiency of the state administration through a drastic reduction of redundant holders of military and official ranks whose stipends were paid from the state treasury, limit the influence of imperial eunuchs, revise tax registers, and impose stricter supervision over the content of instruction in state schools and academies. During the first year of his reign, the Jiajing Emperor was able to force significant concessions from the government, but he lacked the power to dismiss the officials who opposed him, while Yang could not and did not wish to replace the Emperor, and was therefore limited to persuading him through the force of argument. In his dealings with the bureaucracy, however, Yang was far less constrained. He uncompromisingly demanded support for his policies and tolerated no opposition in the Beijing administration, whether on the imperial rituals or on other political issues. He removed several hundred officials from their posts. Yang began his purge of political opponents as early as May 1521, when he secured the removal, arrest, and exile to the western frontier of Minister of Personnel Wang Qiong, a capable and experienced statesman who had long been Yang's political rival.

Although the participants in the controversy sought arguments and precedents from both the distant and recent past, they unanimously avoided mentioning the establishment of a new line of the Ming imperial house in 1402, when Zhu Di, Prince of Yan, emerged victorious in a civil war, overthrew his nephew, the Jianwen Emperor (r. 1398–1402), and ascended the throne as the Yongle Emperor. The Yongle Emperor himself also adhered to the principle of the inviolability of the line of succession. He resolved the situation by erasing the four-year reign of the Jianwen Emperor from official history and declaring himself the legitimate heir and immediate successor of his father, the Hongwu Emperor. Any discussion of the legitimacy and legality of the Yongle Emperor's rule threatened far-reaching consequences, as it could have called into question the legitimacy of both his reign and those of all subsequent Ming emperors.

Despite the overall easing of the debate, ritual issues remained a sensitive and contentious subject. In the autumn of 1522, the Emperor wished his mother to be responsible for selecting his empress and consorts. Yang Tinghe secured the supervision of Empress Dowager Zhang, arguing that she had been the mother over the realm for four decades, that it was through her edicts that the Jiajing Emperor had been summoned to the throne and his parents elevated to imperial status, and that it was therefore only natural that she should choose his empress and consorts. When the Jiajing Emperor's grandmother, Lady Shao, died in December 1522, Yang proposed that only one day of mourning be observed for her. He also disputed the arrangements for her burial, further straining his relationship with the Emperor. In late June 1523, during a personal meeting with the grand secretaries, the Emperor again raised the issue of improving his parents' titles by adding the character huang. Despite maintaining mutual courtesy, the grand secretaries replied that they would not draft the requested edict under any circumstances, even if they were to be executed for refusing, and repeated their arguments explaining why his demand was unacceptable.

== Rise of the pro-Jiajing faction and renewed debate ==
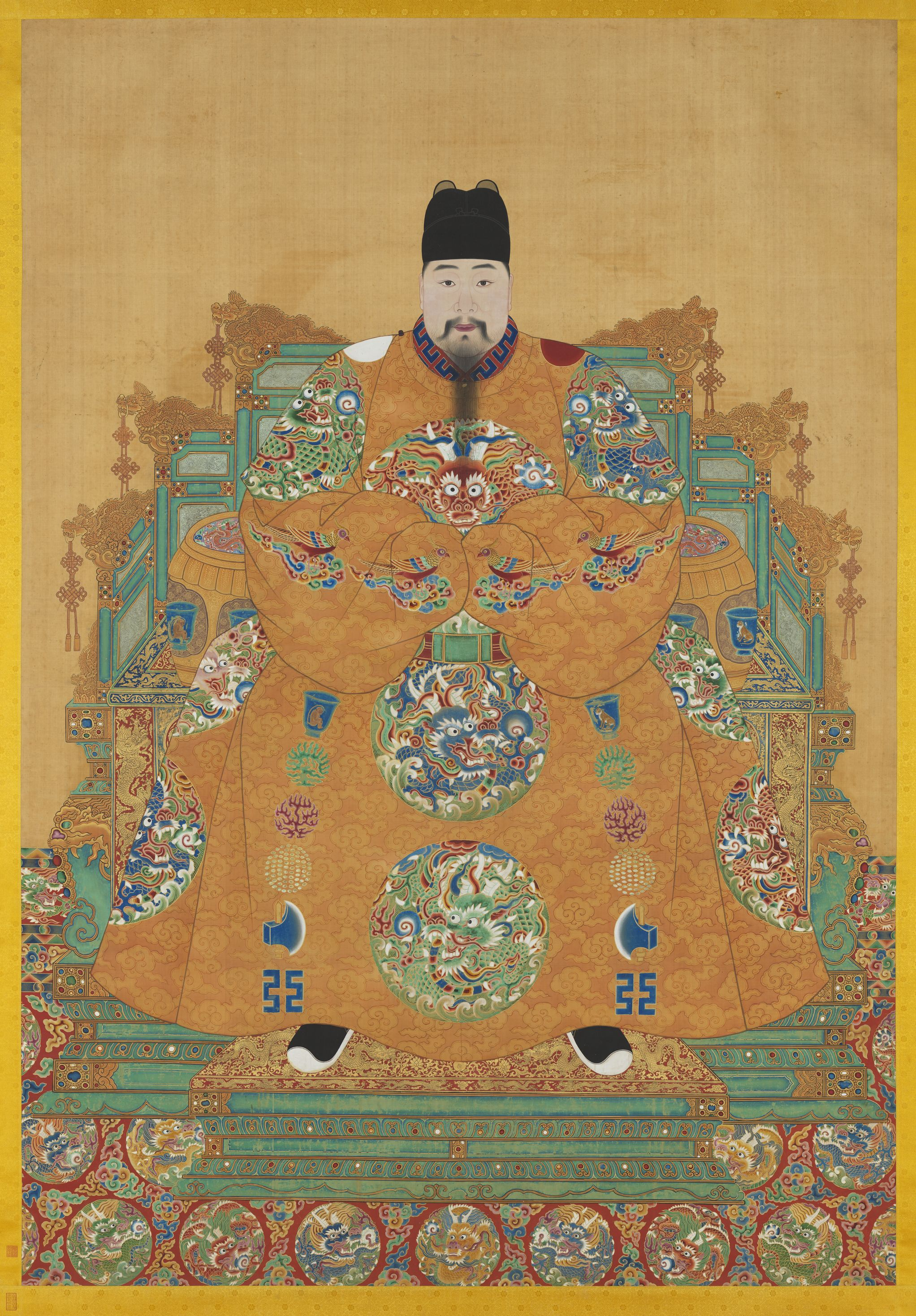
Official portrait of Zhu Youyuan after his posthumous elevation to the status of emperor

A new round of debate in the Great Rites Controversy began in February 1524, when the Emperor received a memorandum from Gui E, a secretary in the Nanjing Ministry of Justice. Gui, who supported the Emperor's position, urged him to refer to the Hongzhi Emperor as the "Deceased Imperial Uncle", the Zhengde Emperor as the "Deceased Elder Brother" and Zhu Youyuan as the "Deceased Imperial Father". These were precisely the titles that the Emperor wished to adopt. On 24 February, the Emperor requested the opinions of senior civil, military, and censorial officials, as was customary practice. On 2 March, Minister of Rites Wang Jun (汪俊) submitted a resolution rejecting the Emperor's position, which had been reached at an assembly of 74 high-ranking officials and accompanied by dozens of additional statements of opposition. In total, Wang presented the Emperor with 82 submissions opposing his proposal, signed by approximately 250 officials, and reported that only four individuals—Gui E, Zhang Cong, Huo Tao, and Xiong Jia (熊浹)—supported the Emperor's position. Several days later, the Emperor discovered two additional memoranda supporting his position, submitted by Fang Xianfu and Xi Shu; Gui E had attached their statements to his own memorandum. With the exception of Fang Xianfu, the other supporters were serving outside Beijing.

The Emperor remained silent for two weeks. On 17 March 1524, he declared that he intended to reopen the issue of the imperial rituals and that the dispute had to be resolved through compromise, so that the direct line of succession could be preserved while his desire to honor his parents could also be satisfied. He then began summoning his supporters to Beijing.

In the first half of March, relations between the Emperor and the officials underwent a lasting shift to the officials' disadvantage. On 6 March 1524, Supervising Secretary Deng Jizeng (鄧繼曾) submitted a critical memorandum to the Emperor. Deng supported the grand secretaries, arguing that trust and collegiality had been lost between the Emperor on one side and the grand secretaries and ministers on the other. He criticized the Emperor for bypassing the Grand Secretariat by directly issuing imperial decrees prepared by unworthy individuals, behind the grand secretaries' backs. The Emperor reacted angrily, ordering Deng's imprisonment and later his demotion to a lower post in the provinces. This was the first time the Emperor punished criticism, but it was far from the last. Several days later, Yang Tinghe requested dismissal from office, citing serious health problems as the reason for his resignation. He was already 64 years old and frustrated by the Emperor's increasingly assertive exercise of authority. On 15 March 1524, the Emperor accepted Yang's resignation and dismissed him with all customary honors, and he was succeeded as senior grand secretary by Jiang Mian (蔣冕), who lacked Yang's authority both with the Emperor and within the bureaucracy. After Yang's resignation, intense debate erupted in the Beijing government offices, both sides accusing each other of factionalism and plotting either to bring about the premature deaths of the Emperor's supporters or to remove their opponents from office. By August 1524, the most outspoken opponents of the Emperor had been forced out of office and replaced by officials expected to support the Emperor.

== Escalation of the debate ==
With the weakening of the Grand Secretariat after Yang Tinghe's departure, the Emperor gained greater freedom in personnel matters. This became evident in late April 1524, when Minister of Rites Wang Jun requested resignation due to illness and was dismissed by the Emperor. (Note: The Emperor became angry with Wang Jun because he suspected that Wang was avoiding responsibility and merely pretending to be ill. It soon became clear, however, that his illness was genuine: Wang died shortly after his dismissal.) The Emperor rejected the candidates proposed by the Ministry of Personnel for the vacant position, (Note: Minister Qiao Yu (喬宇) had recommended promoting one of the incumbent vice ministers of rites, Jia Yong (賈詠) and Wu Yipeng (吳一鵬).) and appointed Xi Shu as minister of rites on his own initiative. At the same time, he called on officials to propose a suitable compromise solution to the controversy and sent word to Zhang Cong, Gui E, and Xi Shu, who were travelling from Nanjing to Beijing, to halt their journey and await further instructions. Zhang and Gui stopped and, after learning of the Emperor's appeal to the officials, informed him through a messenger that the use of the characters bensheng in the titles of his parents implied that the Emperor also had other, adoptive parents. The Emperor then concluded that he needed his supporters in Beijing and summoned them to continue their journey to the capital.

The Emperor's appointment of Xi as minister provoked a storm of protests. Officials argued that, until then, ministers of rites had always been appointed from among members of the Hanlin Academy on the recommendation of the Ministry of Personnel, whereas the Emperor had violated both of these conventions. In July 1524, Xi's opponents further accused him of corruption and incompetence in dealing with the famine in the Nanjing region. Xi responded by requesting a thorough investigation of the accusations, asserting that he had in fact saved one million people. He also stated that many officials were afraid to oppose the majority opinion even when they disagreed with it.

The debate became increasingly heated as it shifted to the issue of establishing a shrine for the Emperor's father in the Forbidden City. The Emperor's opponents argued that his father already had a shrine in Anlu. Because of his opposition to the Emperor's actions, Senior Grand Secretary Jiang Mian submitted his resignation on 2 June 1524. The Emperor accepted his resignation, and the shrine was completed on 10 July 1524.

Zhang and Gui arrived in Beijing in late June 1524. Their statements in support of the Emperor provoked a storm of protests: 30 supervising secretaries and more than 40 censors jointly accused them of spreading false and erroneous views. The two men called for a public debate and argued that the unity of their opponents had been achieved through intimidation of the majority of officials. On 13 July, the Emperor appointed his supporters to senior positions in the Hanlin Academy: Zhang and Gui were made chancellors, while Fang Xianfu was appointed an academician reader-in-waiting. The appointments triggered a new wave of protests from Hanlin scholars and supervisory secretaries, who argued that high offices should not be given to careerists seeking to please the Emperor and that the promotion of such obvious opportunists would demoralize upright officials throughout the empire. Minister of Personnel Qiao Yu called for the annulment of their appointments. The Emperor, however, declared that they were loyal, honest, and qualified. More than seventy supervisory secretaries and censors demanded the execution of Zhang, Gui, and Fang for having misled the Emperor. Minister of Justice Zhao Jian (趙鑑) stated that he was prepared to initiate criminal proceedings against them, but the Emperor rejected his proposal. Fearing for their lives, the Emperor assigned them armed protection. On 22 July, thirty-six junior members of the Hanlin Academy requested dismissal from office in protest, led by Yang Shen, the son of Yang Tinghe. As further individual protests arrived, (Note: For example, two physicians from the Imperial Academy of Medicine requested that the newly constructed shrine for the Emperor's father be renamed.) the Emperor began imprisoning those responsible for them.

== Crisis of August 1524 and the end of the controversy ==
On 3 August, Fang Xianfu requested permission to leave government service, stating that he had supported the Emperor because it was the right thing to do and that he was not interested in official positions. The Emperor rejected his resignation. On 5 August, Minister of Personnel Qiao Yu resigned in protest. On 11 August, the Emperor ordered the Ministry of Rites to prepare the program for the ceremonies honoring Heaven, Earth, and the imperial ancestors, scheduled for 15 August, while prohibiting the use of the word bensheng in his mother's title. Minister of Rites Xi Shu had not yet arrived in Beijing, so the ministry was led by Vice Minister Zhu Xizhou (朱希周). Zhu rejected the Emperor's request to remove the term, arguing that it had been used since the compromise reached three years earlier, when the Jiajing Emperor had recognized the Hongzhi Emperor as his adoptive father. The existing arrangement satisfied both of the Emperor's aims: preserving the direct line of succession and allowing him to honor his parents. Changing established rituals, Zhu argued, would inevitably be rejected by Heaven and the ancestors and would create uncertainty within the state. The grand secretaries Mao Ji (毛紀) and Shi Bao (石珤) refused to approve the Emperor's proposed change. At a subsequent personal meeting, they did not openly oppose him, but they also withheld their support. Scholars of the Hanlin Academy, along with censorial and ministerial officials, submitted numerous protests against the change, which they regarded as a violation of proper rituals. The Emperor ordered eight critics to be arrested.

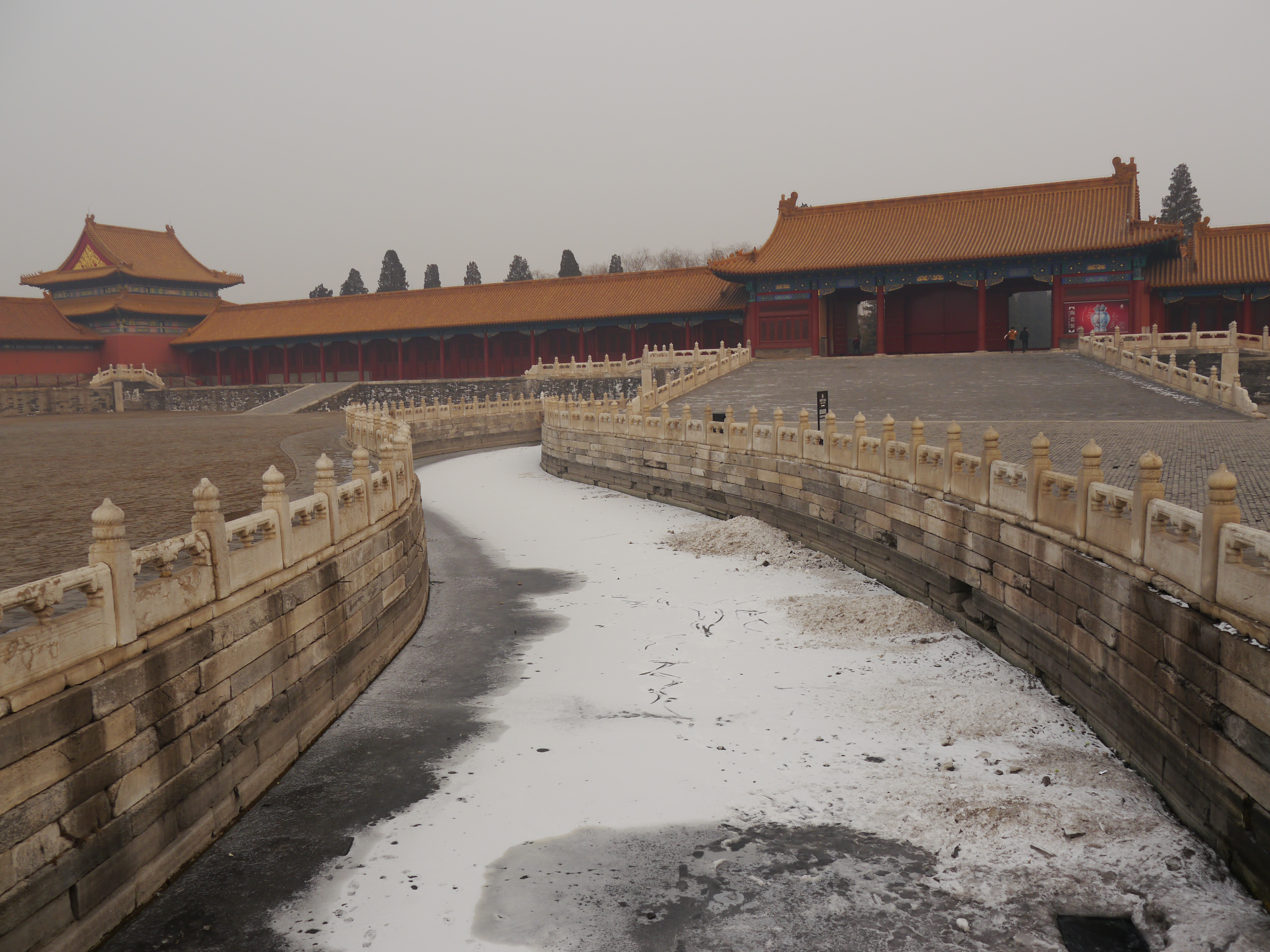
The Gate of Blending Harmony, known as the Gate of Left Obedience (Zuoshun Gate) during the Ming

Zhang Cong prepared a detailed analysis of the controversy in which he condemned the arguments of his opponents as deceptive and misleading. Vice Minister of Personnel He Mengchun (何孟春) unofficially obtained a copy of the analysis and wrote a response refuting Zhang's arguments. He emphasized that public state rituals confirming succession were a different matter from private rituals for honoring family ancestors. The Emperor refused to allow He's analysis to be circulated for discussion. On 14 August, at He's urging, a total of 232 officials (approximately one tenth of the personnel of the Beijing government offices) remained outside the audience hall at Zuoshun Gate after the morning audience. Led by Yang Shen, they knelt for four hours and chanted the names of the Hongwu Emperor and the Hongzhi Emperor, both of whom were regarded by officials as exemplary rulers. They refused to leave without a written order, but even after such an order was issued, they still remained and instead began beating on the palace doors. By mid-afternoon, the Emperor's patience was exhausted, and he ordered the Embroidered Uniform Guard to arrest them all. He released the high- and low-ranking officials, but ordered 134 officials of intermediate rank to be beaten five days later, leading to the deaths of 17 officials. All participants in the demonstration were punished in various ways, including demotion, transfer away from Beijing, exile to the frontier, or expulsion from official service. The Emperor personally reprimanded He Mengchun and fined him one month's salary. The ceremony on 15 August proceeded in accordance with the Emperor's wishes: his mother was not given the title containing the term bensheng. Senior Grand Secretary Mao Ji resigned with honors on 23 August and was replaced by Fei Hong, who during the controversy had maneuvered between the Emperor and the opposing officials.

== Consequences ==
The Emperor sought to explain and justify his position and therefore ordered the compilation of the "Great Canon for Clarifying Human Relations" (Minglun dadian), a collection of arguments supporting the imperial viewpoint, under the direction of Zhang Cong. The work was completed and published in June 1528. The collection strongly criticized Yang Tinghe and Minister Mao Cheng, the latter of whom had died by that time. The Emperor simultaneously stripped Yang of his official ranks, titles and state pension, and expelled him from the civil service. He died in 1529. The Emperor inflicted penalties against other officials who had spoken against him during the Great Rites Controversy. Higher-ranking officials lost their offices, while lower-ranking officials were expelled from official service.

Even after these events, a dissatisfied opposition remained, but the Emperor did not wish to engage in political purges and accepted proposals for suppressing it only reluctantly. On the other hand, he refused to pardon those who had already been punished. He also rejected Xi Shu's proposal for purges carried out under the banner of combating corruption, arguing that the abuses of the Zhengde era had already been dealt with and that new purges would be inappropriate.

Originally an insignificant dispute, the controversy grew in importance over time and had significant indirect consequences. Xi Shu was a friend and patron of the Confucian scholar and reformer Wang Yangming, and he drew upon Wang's arguments during the debates. The controversy therefore contributed to the wider dissemination of Wang's teachings. At the same time, the need to support arguments with precedents and ancient texts during the debates encouraged the development of critical textual studies and interpretations, while criticism of the conservative positions of the Hanlin Academy increased. During the controversy, the Jiajing Emperor secured independence from the grand secretaries and thereafter made decisions largely according to his own judgment, rather than discussing matters with them or merely approving their proposals. The affected scholars criticized this as despotism inconsistent with traditional methods of governance.
