= Nanhai County =

Former county in Guangdong, China

- Traditional Chinese: 南海縣
- Literal meaning: Southern Sea County
Transcriptions
Standard Mandarin
- Hanyu Pinyin: Nánhǎi Xiàn
Yue: Cantonese
- Jyutping: Naam4-hoi2 Jyun6-2

Nanhai County was a former county in Guangdong Province, China, named after the South China Sea.

Its former area now makes up Chancheng and Nanhai Districts in Foshan, and Liwan District in Guangzhou.

== See also ==
- History of Guangdong
