= List of consorts and children of the Jiajing Emperor =

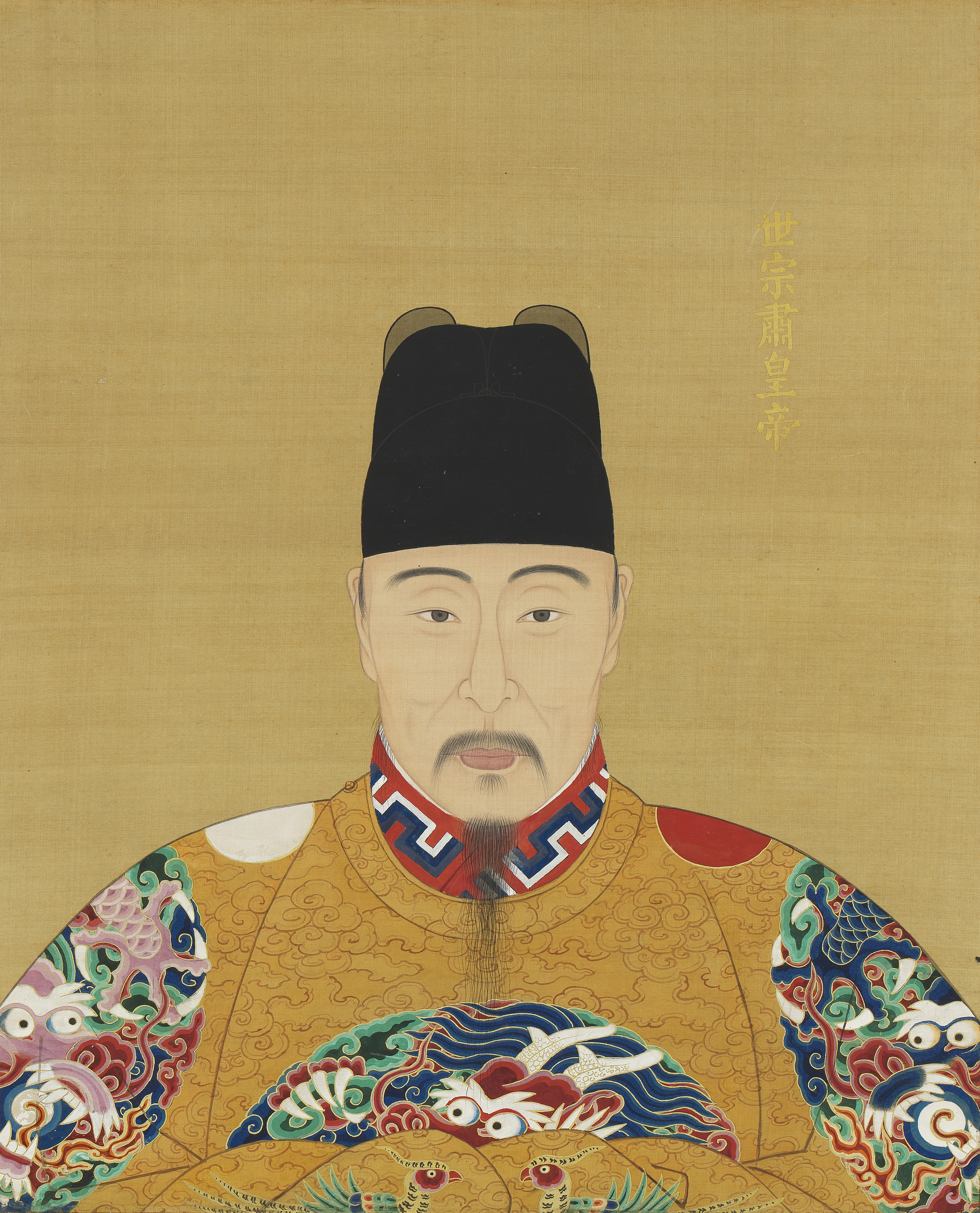
Portrait of the Jiajing Emperor

The Jiajing Emperor, the 12th emperor of the Ming dynasty of China, had three empresses during his reign, as well as a large number of consorts of various ranks. His first empress was Lady Chen, who was chosen by his aunt, Empress Dowager Zhang. Lady Chen became empress in 1522. In 1528, following a dispute with the Emperor over her jealousy toward two other consorts, she suffered a miscarriage while pregnant and died shortly afterward on 21 October of that year. The Emperor showed his displeasure by granting her only a modest burial and the uncomplimentary posthumous name Daoling (悼靈). In 1536, on the advice of Grand Secretary Xia Yan, the name was changed to Xiaojiesu (孝潔肅).

The second empress, surnamed Zhang, was the daughter of a guard officer and entered the palace in 1526. After Lady Chen died, the Jiajing Emperor chose Lady Zhang as the new empress and she officially ascended on 8 January 1529. In early 1534, she was deposed for reasons that remain unclear, possibly because she had spoken in defense of Empress Dowager Zhang, with whom the Emperor had a strained relationship. (Note: The Jiajing Emperor harbored resentment towards Empress Dowager Zhang due to their differing attitudes towards his parents during the Great Rites Controversy. In 1525, when her palace burned down, the Emperor refused to rebuild it and instead relocated her to a smaller residence. In 1533, he had her younger brother, Zhang Yanling, arrested after it was revealed that he had committed murder in 1515 and then killed a guard officer who was blackmailing him for the first murder. Zhang Yanling was executed in 1546. Another brother, Zhang Heling, was arrested in late 1537 on false charges of witchcraft. The accusers were eventually exiled, but Zhang Heling died after a month in prison. After the death of Empress Dowager Zhang in 1541, the Jiajing Emperor gave her a simple burial with minimal ceremony.) She died in 1536.

The third empress, Lady Fang, came from the south, specifically from the Nanjing region. She entered the palace in 1530 and became empress on 28 January 1534. She was reportedly chosen because she shared the Emperor's delight in court ceremonies. In 1542, she thwarted an assassination attempt on the Emperor by a group of palace women, but the Emperor held a grudge against her for the execution of his favorite consort after the plot. In 1547, when the palace caught fire, the Emperor refused to issue an order to save her, resulting in her death. Nevertheless, he accorded Empress Fang a lavish funeral and bestowed upon her the auspicious posthumous name Xiaolie (孝烈).

The Emperor had a total of eight sons and five daughters, but only two sons and two daughters survived into adulthood. The eldest son died at two months of age in 1533. The Emperor declared his second son, Zhu Zairui, the heir to the throne in 1539. The same year, he appointed his third son, Zhu Zaiji, as the Prince of Yu and his fourth son, Zhu Zaizhen, as the Prince of Jing. After Zhu Zairui's death in 1549, the Emperor struggled to choose a new successor, leading to rivalry between the two remaining princes. Eventually, in 1561, Zhu Zaizhen left Beijing for his residence in Anlu, Huguang, where he died on 9 February 1565. After the Jiajing Emperor's death in 1567, Zhu Zaiji ascended the throne as the Longqing Emperor.

== List ==
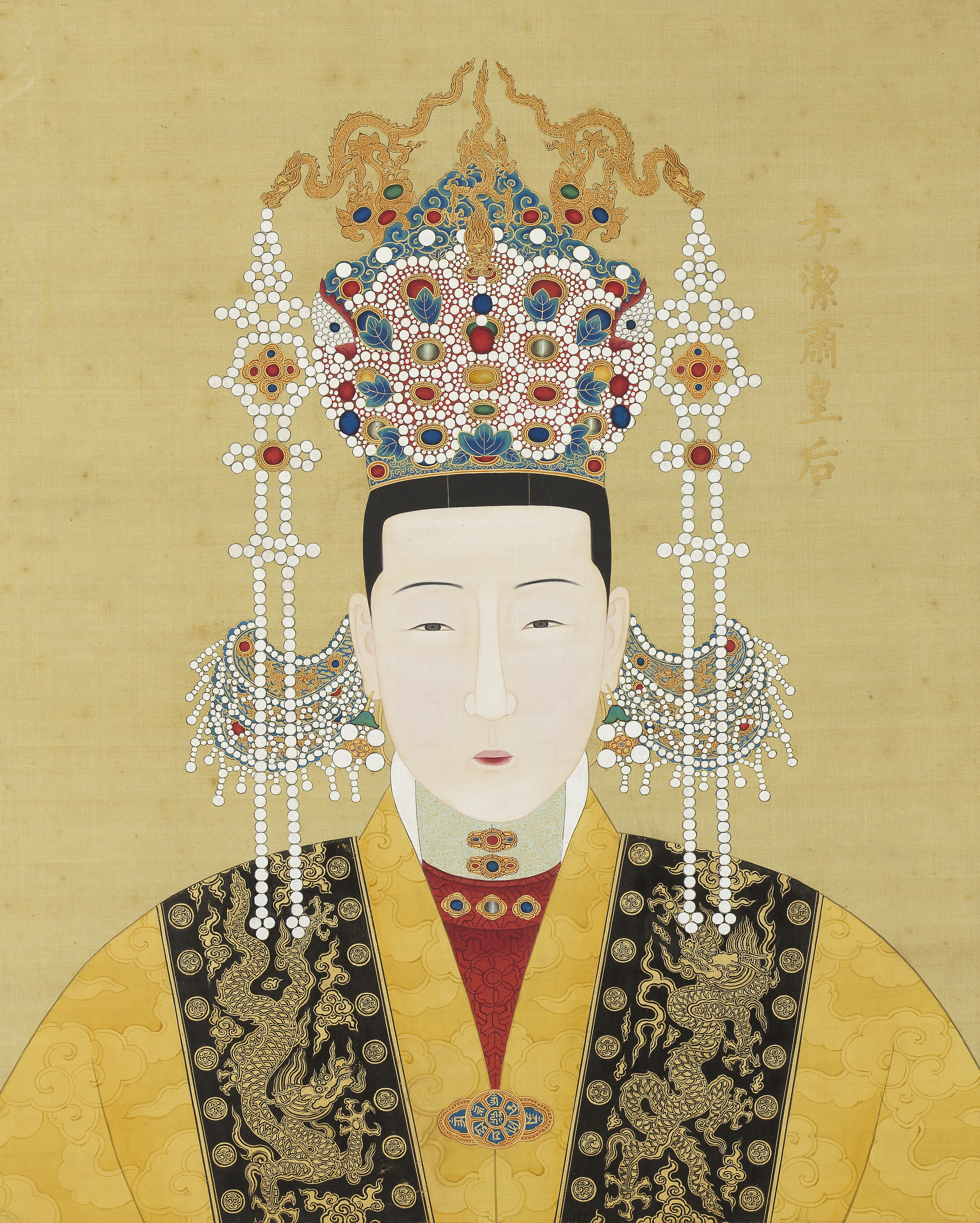
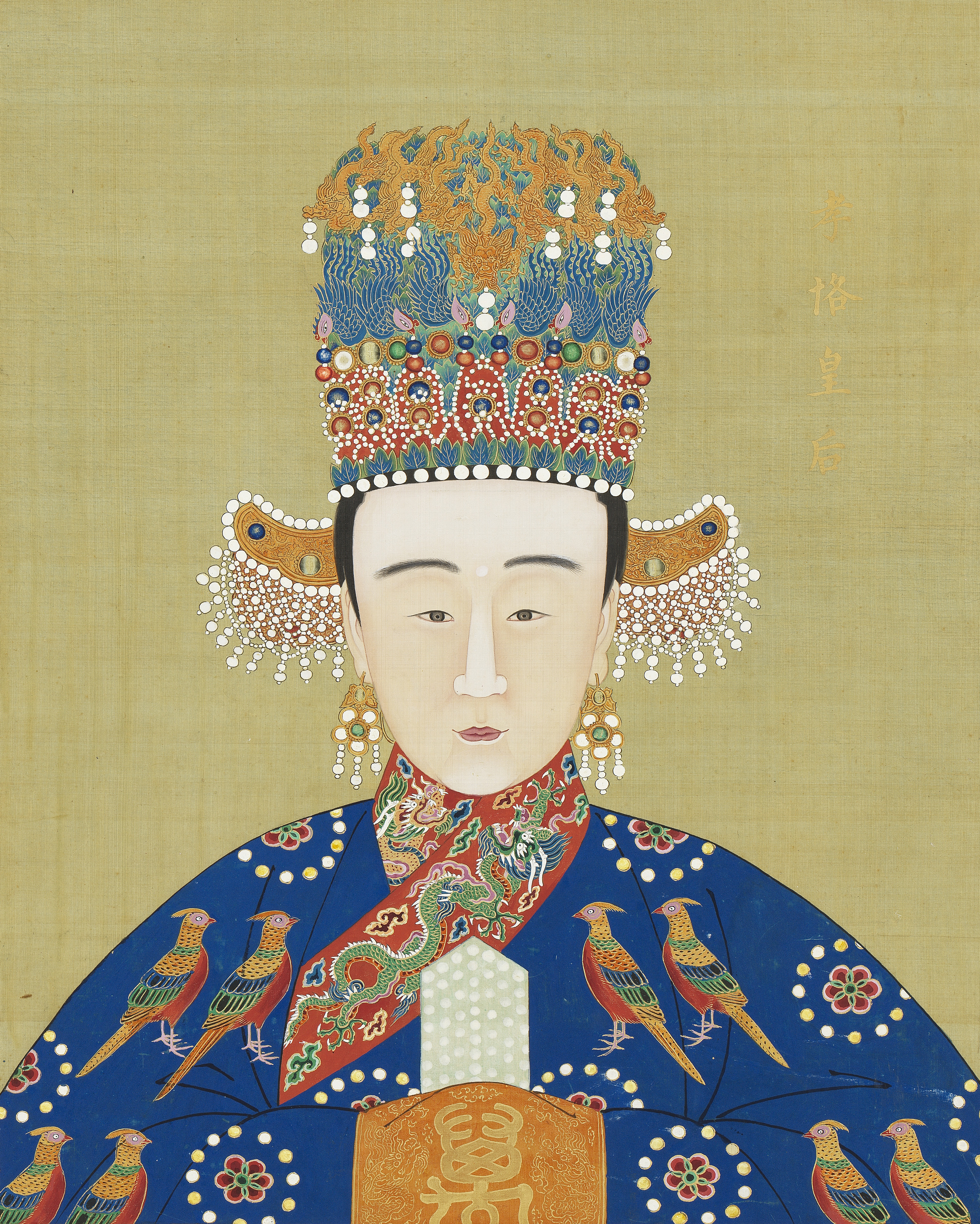
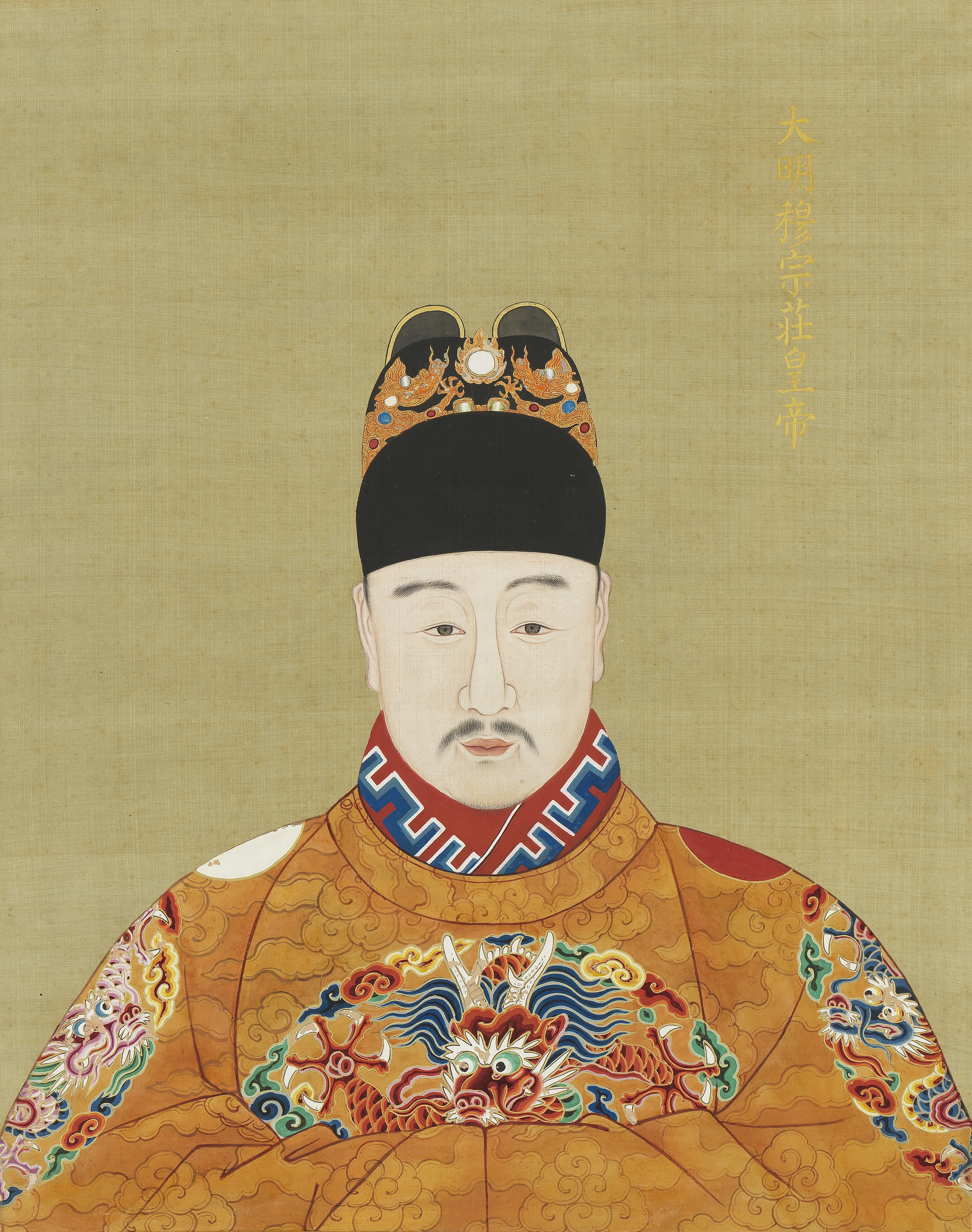
From left to right: Lady Chen, the Jiajing Emperor's first empress; Lady Du, the mother of the Longqing Emperor; and the Longqing Emperor, the Jiajing Emperor's third son and successor

Consorts and children of the Jiajing Emperor
| Consorts | Children (Note: Children of the Jiajing Emperor by his respective consorts, with birth order indicated) |
|---|---|
| Empress Xiaojiesu (孝潔肅皇后) of the Chen clan (陳氏; 1508–1528) | Miscarriage (1528) |
| Deposed Empress (廢后) of the Zhang clan (d. 1536) | —N/a |
| Empress Xiaolie (孝烈皇后) of the Fang clan (d. 1547) | —N/a |
| Empress Xiaoke (孝恪皇后) of the Du clan (杜氏; 1516–1554) | Zhu Zaiji (朱載坖), the Longqing Emperor (隆慶帝; 1537–1572; r. 1567–1572), third son |
| Imperial Noble Consort Duanhegongrongshunwenxi (端和恭榮順溫僖皇貴妃) of the Wang clan (王氏; d. 1550) | Zhu Zairui (朱載壡), Crown Prince Zhuangjing (莊敬皇太子; 1536–1549), second son |
| Imperial Noble Consort Zhuangshunanrongzhenjing (莊順安榮貞靜皇貴妃) of the Shen clan (沈氏; d. 1581) | —N/a |
| Imperial Noble Consort Ronganhuishunduanxi (榮安惠順端僖皇貴妃) of the Yan clan (閻氏; d. 1541) | Zhu Zaiji (朱載基), Crown Prince Aichong (哀衝皇太子), first son |
| Noble Consort Gongxizhenjing (恭僖貞靖貴妃) of the Wen clan (文氏) | —N/a |
| Noble Consort Rong'an (榮安貴妃) of the Ma clan (馬氏) | —N/a |
| Consort Daoyingong (悼隱恭妃) of the Wen clan (文氏; d. 1532) | —N/a |
| Consort Duan (端妃) of the Cao clan (曹氏; d. 1542) | Zhu Shaoying (朱壽媖), Princess Chang'an (常安公主; d. 1549), first daughter |
| Consort Duan (端妃) of the Cao clan (曹氏; d. 1542) | Zhu Luzheng (朱祿媜), Princess Ning'an (寧安公主), third daughter. Married in 1555 to Li He (李和). |
| Consort Huairongxian (懷榮賢妃) of the Zheng clan (鄭氏; d. 1536) | —N/a |
| Consort Duanhuianyongjing (端惠安榮靖妃) of the Lu clan (盧氏; d. 1588) | Zhu Zaizhen (朱載圳), Prince Gong of Jing (景恭王; 1537–1565), fourth son |
| Consort Su (肅妃) of the Jiang clan (江氏) | Zhu Zaishang (朱載墒), Prince Shang of Ying (潁殤王), fifth son |
| Consort Yi (溫靜懿妃) of the Zhao clan (趙氏; d. 1569) | Zhu Zaijian (朱載𰋁), Prince Huai of Qi (戚懷王), sixth son |
| Consort Yong (雍妃) of the Chen clan (陳氏; d. 1586) | Zhu Zaikui (朱載㙺), Prince Ai of Ji (薊哀王), seventh son |
| Consort Yong (雍妃) of the Chen clan (陳氏; d. 1586) | Zhu Ruirong (朱瑞嬫), Princess Guishan (歸善公主; d. 1544), fourth daughter |
| Consort Zhaojinghui (昭靖徽妃) of the Wang clan (王氏; d. 1571) | Zhu Fuyuan (朱福媛), Princess Sirou (思柔公主; 1538–1549), second daughter |
| Consort Zhaojinghui (昭靖徽妃) of the Wang clan (王氏; d. 1571) | Zhu Zaifeng (朱載堸), Prince Si of Jun (均思王), eighth son |
| Consort Rongzhaode (榮昭德妃) of the Zhang clan (張氏; d. 1574) | Zhu Suzhen (朱素嫃), Princess Jiashan (嘉善公主; d. 1564), fifth daughter. Married in 1557 to Xu Congcheng (許從誠). |
| Consort Rong'anzhen (榮安貞妃) of the Ma clan (馬氏; d. 1565) | —N/a |
| Consort Shu (淑妃) of the Zhang clan (張氏) | —N/a |
| Consort Gongxili (恭僖麗妃) of the Wang clan (王氏; d. 1552) | —N/a |
| Consort Gongshuanxirong (恭淑安僖榮妃) of the Yang clan (楊氏; d. 1566) | —N/a |
| Consort Duanhuiyong (端惠永妃) of the Xu clan (徐氏) | —N/a |
| Consort An (安妃) of the Shen clan (沈氏) | —N/a |
| Consort Chen (宸妃) of the Wang clan (王氏) | —N/a |
| Consort Shou (壽妃) of the Shang clan (尙氏; 1554–1610) | —N/a |
| Consort Yi (宜妃) of the Bao clan (包氏; d. 1549) | —N/a |
| Consort Jing (靜妃) of the Chen clan (陳氏; d. 1549) | —N/a |
| Consort Mu (睦妃) of the He clan (何氏; d. 1550) | —N/a |
| Consort Zhuang (莊妃) of the Wang clan (王氏; d. 1553) | —N/a |
| Consort Min (旻妃) of the Chu clan (褚氏; d. 1553) | —N/a |
| Consort Chang (常妃) of the Zhang clan (張氏; d. 1553) | —N/a |
| Consort An (安妃) of the Peng clan (彭氏; d. 1554) | —N/a |
| Consort He (和妃) of the Peng clan (高氏; d. 1555) | —N/a |
| Consort Ping (平妃) of the Geng clan (耿氏; d. 1555) | —N/a |
| Consort Ding (定妃) of the Wu clan (吳氏; d. 1555) | —N/a |
| Consort Shun (順妃) of the Li clan (李氏; d. 1555) | —N/a |
| Consort Huai (懷妃) of the Wang clan (王氏; d. 1557) | —N/a |
| Consort Yi (宜妃) of the Yu clan (于氏; d. 1557) | —N/a |
| Consort An (安妃) of the Zhang clan (張氏; d. 1558) | —N/a |
| Consort Jing (靜妃) of the Zhu clan (朱氏; d. 1563) | —N/a |
| Consort He (和妃) of the Zhang clan (張氏; d. 1563) | —N/a |
| Consort An (安妃) of the Gao clan (高氏; d. 1564) | —N/a |
| Consort Yi (宜妃) of the Song clan (宋氏; d. 1563) | —N/a |
| Consort Kang (康妃) of the Wang clan (王氏; d. 1569) | —N/a |
| Consort Zhuang (莊妃) of the Du clan (杜氏; d. 1568) | —N/a |
| Concubine He (和嬪) of the Lu clan (盧氏) | —N/a |
| Concubine Hui (惠嬪) of the Wei clan (韋氏) | —N/a |
| Concubine Zhuang (莊嬪) of the Wang clan (王氏) | —N/a |
| Concubine Jing (靜嬪) of the Wang clan (王氏) | —N/a |
| Concubine Shun (順嬪) of the Ren clan (任氏) | —N/a |
| Concubine Yu (裕嬪) of the Wang clan (王氏; d. 1540) | —N/a |
| Concubine Shu (淑嬪) of the Liu clan (劉氏; d. 1540) | —N/a |
| Concubine Yi (宜嬪) of the Wang clan (王氏) | —N/a |
| Concubine Rong (榮嬪) of the Xu clan (余氏) | —N/a |
| Concubine Jing (敬嬪) of the Li clan (李氏) | —N/a |
| Concubine Ning (寧嬪) of the Wang clan (王氏; d. 1542) (Note: She was the leader of the 1542 assassination attempt against the Emperor.) | —N/a |
| Concubine Yu (御嬪) of the Huang clan (黃氏; d. 1556) | —N/a |
| Concubine Wan (婉嬪) of the Zhao clan (趙氏; d. 1557) | —N/a |
| Concubine Ning (寧嬪) of the Guo clan (郭氏) | —N/a |
| Concubine Chang (常嬪) of the Ma clan (馬氏; d. 1557) | —N/a |
| Concubine Chang (常嬪) of the Yang clan (楊氏; d. 1558) | —N/a |
| Concubine Chang (常嬪) of the Yang clan (楊氏; d. 1559) | —N/a |
| Concubine Chang (常嬪) of the Liu clan (劉氏; d. 1559) | —N/a |
| Concubine Chang (常嬪) of the Liu clan (劉氏) | —N/a |
| Concubine Chang (常嬪) of the Zhang clan (張氏; d. 1561) | —N/a |
| Concubine Kang (康嬪) of the Liu clan (劉氏) | —N/a |
| Concubine Chang (常嬪) of the Zhang clan (張氏; d. 1559) | —N/a |
| Concubine Chang (常嬪) of the Fu clan (傅氏; d. 1561) | —N/a |
| Concubine Chang (常嬪) of the Wu clan (武氏; d. 1563) | —N/a |
| Concubine An (安嬪) of the Meng clan (孟氏; d. 1565) | —N/a |
| Concubine Li (麗嬪) of the Song clan (宋氏; d. 1565) | —N/a |
| Concubine He (和嬪) of the Ren clan (任氏; d. 1566) | —N/a |
| Concubine Chang (常嬪) of the Gao clan (高氏; d. 1566) | —N/a |
| Concubine Chang (常嬪) of the Wang clan (王氏; d. 1566) | —N/a |
| Concubine Chang (常嬪) of the Li clan (李氏) | —N/a |
| Concubine Chang (常嬪) of the Chen clan (陳氏) | —N/a |
