= Jiajing Emperor =

Emperor of China from 1521 to 1567

Jiajing Emperor 嘉靖帝
- Palace portrait on a hanging scroll

Emperor of the Ming dynasty
- Reign: 27 May 1521 – 23 January 1567
- Enthronement: 27 May 1521
- Predecessor: Zhengde Emperor
- Successor: Longqing Emperor
- Born: 16 September 1507; Anluzhou, Huguang Province, Ming dynasty
- Died: 23 January 1567 (aged 59); Palace of Heavenly Purity, Forbidden City, Beijing, Ming dynasty
- Burial: Yong Mausoleum, Ming tombs, Beijing
- Consorts: Empress Xiaojiesu (m. 1522; died 1528) Empress Zhang (m. 1522; dep. 1534) Empress Xiaolie (m. 1530; died 1547) Empress Xiaoke (m. 1530; died 1554)
- Issue Detail: Zhu Zairui, Crown Prince Zhuangjing; Longqing Emperor; Zhu Zaizhen, Prince Gong of Jing
Era dates
- Jiajing: (Note: Chinese: 嘉靖; pinyin: Jiājìng) 28 January 1522 – 8 February 1567
Posthumous name
- Emperor Qintian Lüdao Yingyi Shengshen Xuanwen Guangwu Hongren Daxiao Su (Note: Simplified Chinese: 钦天履道英毅圣神宣文广武洪仁大孝肃皇帝; traditional Chinese: 欽天履道英毅聖神宣文廣武洪仁大孝肅皇帝 (conferred by the Longqing Emperor in 1567))
Temple name
- Shizong (Note: Chinese: 世宗; pinyin: Shìzōng)
- House: Zhu
- Dynasty: Ming
- Father: Zhu Youyuan
- Mother: Lady Jiang
- Religion: Taoism

Chinese name
- Chinese: 嘉靖帝
Transcriptions
Standard Mandarin
- Hanyu Pinyin: Jiājìng Dì
- Wade–Giles: Chia^{1}-ching^{4} Ti^{4}
- IPA: [tɕjá.tɕîŋ tî]

The Jiajing Emperor (16 September 1507 – 23 January 1567), personal name Zhu Houcong, (Note: Chinese: 朱厚熜; pinyin: Zhū Hòucōng) (Note: Art names: Yaozhai (simplified Chinese: 尧斋; traditional Chinese: 堯齋; pinyin: Yáozhāi), Leixuan (simplified Chinese: 雷轩; traditional Chinese: 雷軒; pinyin: Léixuān), and Tianchi Diaosou (simplified Chinese: 天池钓叟; traditional Chinese: 天池釣叟; pinyin: Tiānchí Diàosǒu)) was the 12th emperor of the Ming dynasty of China, reigning from 1521 to 1567. He succeeded his cousin, the Zhengde Emperor.

The Jiajing Emperor was born as a cousin of the reigning Zhengde Emperor, so his accession to the throne was unexpected, but the government chose him as the new ruler after the Zhengde Emperor died without an heir. After his enthronement, the Jiajing Emperor came into conflict with his officials regarding the method of legalizing his accession. This conflict, known as the Great Rites Controversy, was a significant political issue at the beginning of his reign. After three years, the Emperor emerged victorious, with his main opponents either banished from court or executed.

The Jiajing Emperor, like the Zhengde Emperor, made the decision to reside outside of Beijing's Forbidden City. In 1542, he relocated to the West Park, located in the middle of Beijing and west of the Forbidden City. He constructed a complex of palaces and Taoist temples in the West Park, drawing inspiration from the Taoist belief in the Land of Immortals. Within the West Park, he surrounded himself with a group of loyal court eunuchs, Taoist monks, and trusted advisers (including grand secretaries and ministers of rites) who assisted him in managing the state bureaucracy. Zhang Cong, Xia Yan, Yan Song, and Xu Jie each held senior roles in his government. In his later years, the Emperor's pursuit of immortality led to questionable actions, such as his interest in young girls and alchemy. He even sent Taoist priests across the land to collect rare minerals for life-extending potions. These elixirs contained harmful substances like arsenic, lead, and mercury, which ultimately caused health problems and may have shortened the Emperor's life.

At the start of the Jiajing era, the borders were relatively peaceful. In the north, the Mongols were initially embroiled in internal conflicts, but after being united by Altan Khan in the 1540s, they began to demand the restoration of free trade. The Emperor, however, refused and attempted to close the borders with fortifications, including the Great Wall of China. Altan Khan launched raids and even attacked the outskirts of Beijing in 1550, forcing the Ming troops to focus on defense. Wokou pirates in the Jiajing era posed a significant threat in southeastern China. The Ming authorities attempted to address this issue by implementing stricter laws against private overseas trade in the 1520s, but piracy and related violence continued to escalate throughout the 1540s and reached its peak in the 1550s. Despite the trade restrictions imposed by the Jiajing government and the incidence of the deadly 1556 Shaanxi earthquake in northern China, the economy continued to develop, with growth in agriculture, industry, and trade. As the economy flourished, so did society, with the traditional Confucian interpretation of Zhuism giving way to Wang Yangming's more individualistic beliefs.

== Early life ==
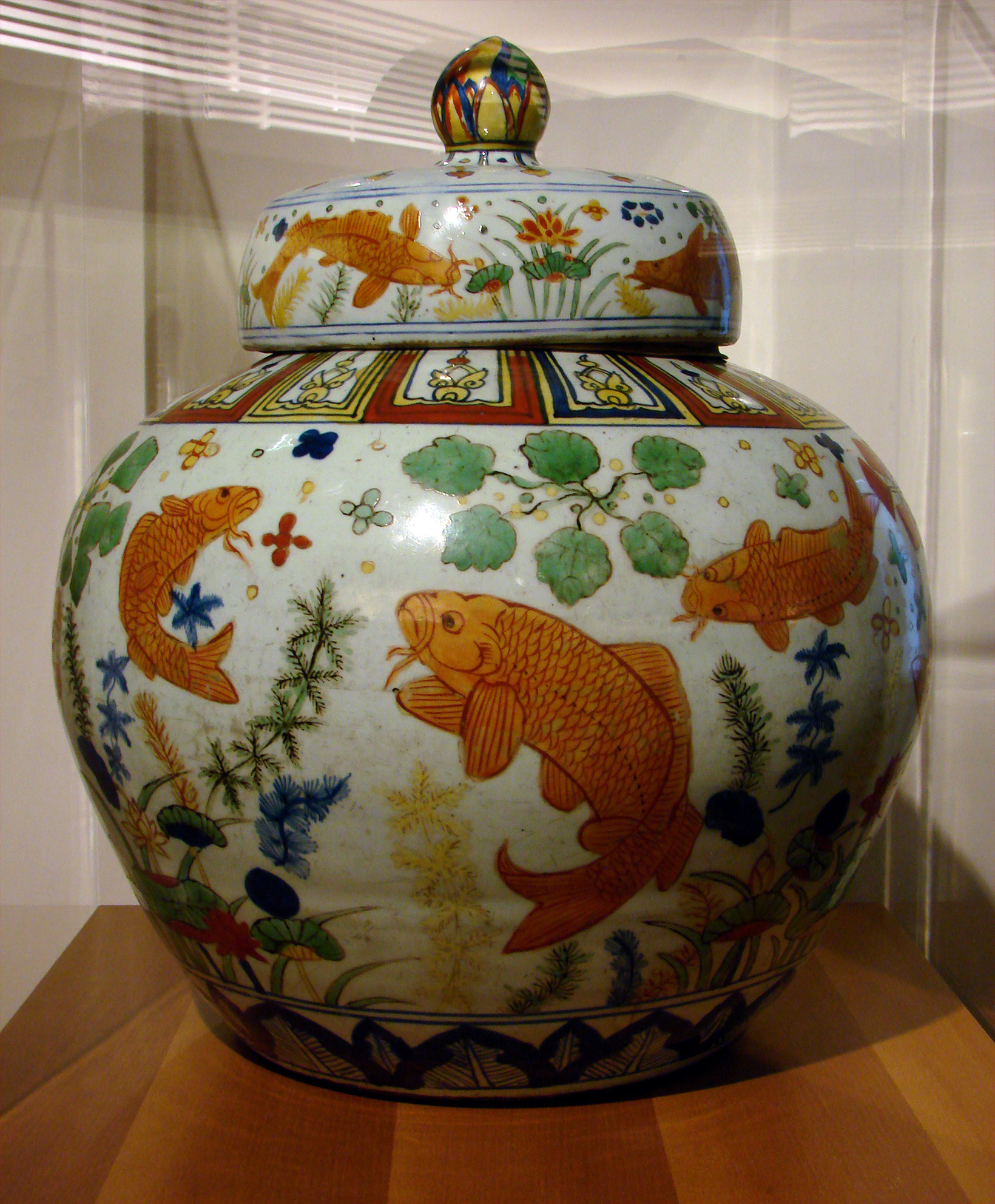
A porcelain vase with glazed fish designs, from the Jiajing era. Guimet Museum, Paris

Zhu Houcong, the future Jiajing Emperor, was born on 16 September 1507. He was the eldest son of Zhu Youyuan, who was Prince of Xing from 1487. Zhu Youyuan was the fourth son of the Chenghua Emperor, who ruled China's Ming dynasty from 1464 to 1487. His mother, Lady Shao, was one of the Emperor's concubines. Zhu Houcong's mother, surnamed Jiang, was the daughter of Jiang Xiao of Daxing in Beizhili. Jiang Xiao was an officer of the Beijing garrison. Zhu Houcong's parents from 1494 lived in Anlu zhou (present-day Zhongxiang) in Huguang in central China, where Zhu Houcong was born. His father, Zhu Youyuan, was known for his poetry and calligraphy.

Zhu Houcong received a classical Confucian education directly from his father, under whom he was a diligent and attentive student. After his father died in July 1519, Zhu Houcong took on the responsibility of managing the household with the assistance of Yuan Zonggao, a capable administrator who later became a trusted advisor after Zhu Houcong's ascension to the throne in Beijing. Following the traditional period of mourning for his father's death, Zhu Houcong officially became the Prince of Xing in late March 1521.

== Beginning of reign ==
=== Accession ===
Shortly after Zhu Houcong assumed the princely title, the Zhengde Emperor (r. 1505–1521) died on 20 April 1521 following an illness. The Zhengde Emperor's father, the Hongzhi Emperor (r. 1487–1505), had been the elder brother of Zhu Youyuan, making Zhu Houcong the deceased emperor's closest surviving male relative. On the day of the Zhengde Emperor's death, Grand Secretary Yang Tinghe, with the support of court eunuchs from the Directorate of Ceremonial in the Forbidden City and Empress Dowager Zhang (the late emperor's mother), issued an edict calling for the prince to arrive in Beijing and ascend the throne.

There was uncertainty surrounding this matter because of the Ming succession law. According to this law, although Ming emperors were allowed to have multiple wives, only the sons of the empress had the right to succeed to the throne. Any attempt to install a descendant of a concubine was punishable by death. Zhu Houcong's father, Zhu Youyuan, was the son of a concubine, so he had no legitimate claim to the throne. In order to circumvent this issue, Yang Tinghe proposed adopting Zhu Houcong as the Hongzhi Emperor's son, so he could ascend as the late Zhengde Emperor's younger brother. In addition, there were many of the deceased emperor's favorites in Beijing feared that a change of ruler would threaten their positions. The most influential among them was Jiang Bin, the commander of the border troops who had been transferred to Beijing. It was feared that he would try to install his own candidate for the throne, Zhu Junzhang (朱俊杖), Prince of Dai, who was based in the border city of Datong. (Note: Zhu Junzhang was a descendant of Zhu Gui (1374–1446), the 13th son of the Hongwu Emperor, the first emperor of the Ming dynasty.)

The day after the Zhengde Emperor's death, a delegation of high-ranking dignitaries left Beijing for Anlu to inform Zhu Houcong of the situation. (Note: The delegation was led by Xu Guangzuo, Duke of Ding (a descendant of Xu Da); Zhang Heling, Marquis of Shouning and the younger brother of Empress Dowager Zhang; the commandant-escort Cui Yuan, husband of the Chenghua Emperor's daughter; Grand Secretary Liang Chu; Minister of Rites Mao Cheng; and three highly ranked eunuchs.) They arrived in Anlu on 2 May. Zhu Houcong accepted them, familiarized himself with the edict of Empress Dowager Zhang, and agreed to ascend the throne. On 7 May, he set out for Beijing accompanied by forty of his own advisers and servants. Yang Tinghe issued orders for him to be welcomed in Beijing as the heir to the throne, but Zhu Houcong refused to appear as the heir apparent, stating that he was invited to assume the imperial rank and was therefore the emperor, not a mere prince. According to the grand secretaries and the government, he was the son of the Hongzhi Emperor. He forced his way into the city with imperial honors and on the same day, 27 May 1521, he ceremoniously ascended the throne. The young emperor reportedly chose the name of his era himself, from his favorite chapter of the Book of Documents, with jia meaning "to improve, make splendid" and jing meaning "to pacify" in Chinese.

=== Great Rites Controversy ===
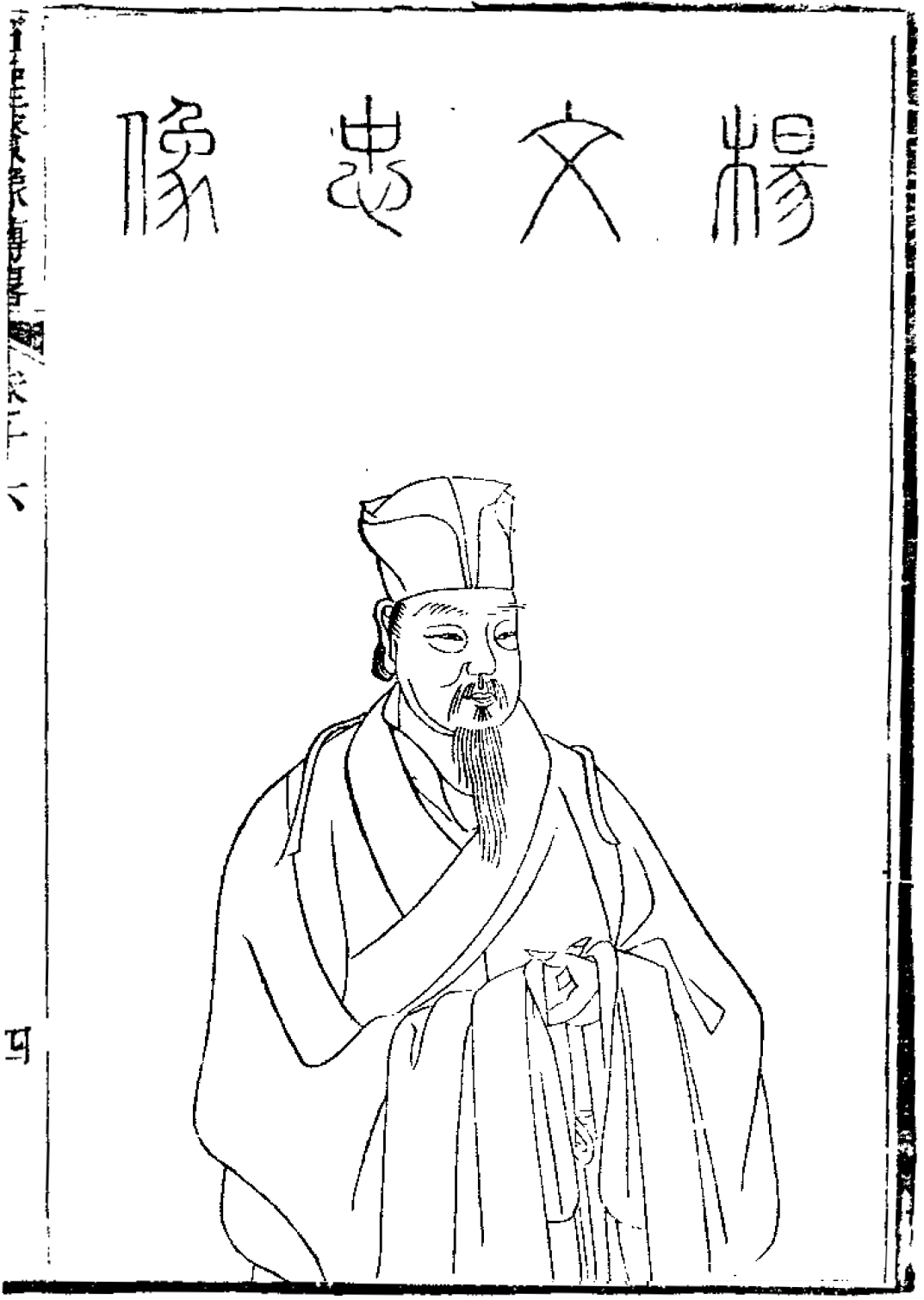
Yang Tinghe, book illustration from the Qing period

The new emperor's primary desire was to posthumously elevate his father to the imperial rank. In contrast, Yang Tinghe insisted on his formal adoption by the Hongzhi Emperor, in order to legitimize his claim to the throne and become the younger brother of the late Zhengde Emperor. The Jiajing Emperor and his mother rejected the adoption, citing the wording of the recall decree which did not mention it. The Emperor did not want to declare his parents as his uncle and aunt. Instead, he requested in the elevation of his parents to the imperial status "to bring their ranks into line".

Most officials agreed to maintain a direct line of succession and supported Yang Tinghe, but the Emperor argued for the duty to his biological parents. He insisted on his mother's acceptance as empress dowager when she arrived from Anlu and entered the Forbidden City on 2 November. A group of officials siding with the Emperor, led by Zhang Cong, (Note: In 1531, Zhang Cong changed his name to Zhang Fujing.) had already formed. In late 1521, the Emperor succeeded in having his parents and grandmother, Lady Shao, granted imperial rank, but disputes continued until Yang was forced to resign in March 1524, and the removal of the Emperor's opponents began in August 1524. After a disapproving demonstration by hundreds of opposing officials in front of the gates of the audience hall, the opposition was beaten at court. 17 officials died from their wounds, and the rest were exiled to the provinces by the Emperor.

During the dispute, the Jiajing Emperor asserted his independence from the grand secretaries and made decisions based on his own judgment, rather than consulting with them or simply approving their proposals. This was seen as a despotic approach that went against the traditional way of governing, and was criticized by concerned scholars. The teachings of Confucian scholar and reformer Wang Yangming gained popularity, as some of the Emperor's followers were influenced by his arguments. Additionally, there was an increase in critical analysis and interpretation of texts during discussions, and there was a growing criticism of the conservative attitudes of the Hanlin Academy.

=== Honoring parents and legitimizing the government ===
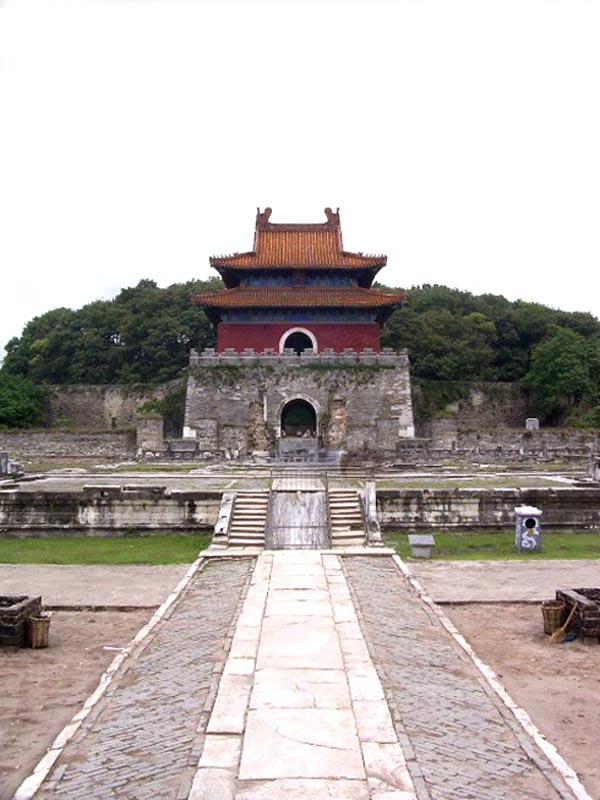
The Xian Mausoleum, where the Jiajing Emperor's parents are buried, Zhongxiang, Hubei

In 1530, the Jiajing Emperor published the biography of the first Ming empress, Lady Ma, the Gao huanghou chuan (高皇后傳), and the Household Instructions of the third empress, Lady Xu, under the title Nüxun (女訓; 'Instructions for women', in 12 volumes). The work was attributed to the Emperor's mother. Additionally, the Emperor changed the temple name of Empress Xu's husband, the Yongle Emperor, from "Taizong" to "Chengzu". (Note: Previously, only the first ruler of the dynasty, the Hongwu Emperor, had a temple name ending in zu (ancestor, founder), while the temple names of other emperors ended in zong (ancestor).) The Yongle Emperor was the first monarch in the new branch of the dynasty, and the Jiajing Emperor's interest in him was rooted in his desire to establish a new branch of the dynasty.

The Emperor suggested transferring his father's remains from the mausoleum in Huguang to the vicinity of the imperial burial ground near Beijing, but in the end, only a shrine was created for his father in the palace. The Emperor also took steps to honor his ancestors, such as restoring ancestral temples, giving his parents longer titles, and supervising rituals and ritual music. After his mother's death in December 1538, the Emperor traveled south to Anlu to resolve the question of whether to bury his parents together in the south or in Beijing. He ultimately chose to bury his mother in his father's mausoleum near Zhongxiang. He also honored his father by publishing the latter's Veritable Records (Shilu) and renamed Anlu zhou to Chengtian Prefecture (承天府) after the example of the imperial capitals.

During his journey to Anlu, the Jiajing Emperor was shocked by the sight of starving and impoverished people and refugees. He immediately released 20 thousand liang (746 kg) of silver for relief. He saw their suffering as a failure of his ceremonial and administrative reforms. Two years later, during civil service examinations, he asked candidates why there was still poverty in the country despite his efforts to faithfully follow Confucian teachings and observe ceremonies.

=== Further ceremony reforms ===
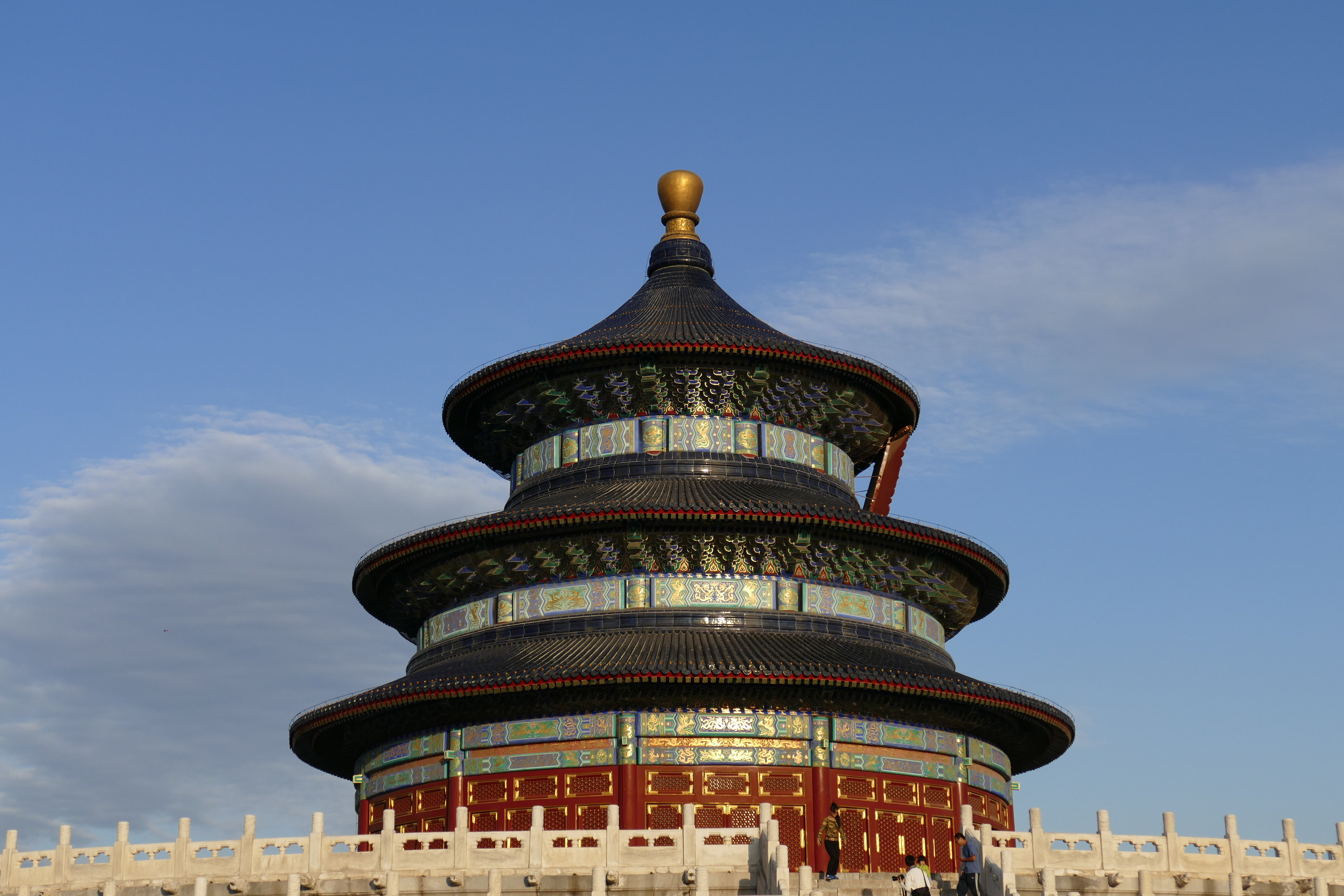
Temple of Heaven in Beijing

After successfully resolving the Great Rites Controversy, the Emperor proceeded to make changes to other rituals and ceremonies, despite facing opposition from some officials. These changes primarily affected the rites performed by the monarch. In the late 1530s, separate sacrifices to the Heavens, Earth, Sun, and Moon were introduced.

Additionally, the Jiajing Emperor altered the titles and forms of honoring Confucius, including a ban on images in Confucian temples, leaving only plaques with the names of Confucius and his followers. (Note: The founder of the Ming dynasty, the Hongwu Emperor (r. 1368–1398), had banned prayers to Confucius in Buddhist and Taoist temples, and the use of name tablets in place of images was proposed, but his decree was not enforced until before 1530.) The layout of the Temple of Confucius was also modified to include separate chapels for Confucius' father and three disciples. As part of these changes, Confucius was stripped of his title of king by the Jiajing Emperor, who believed that the Emperor should not bow to a king. Furthermore, the Emperor did not want Confucius to be worshipped in the same rituals used for imperial sacrifices to the Heavens. The ceremonies in the Temple of Confucius were simplified and no longer resembled imperial sacrifices.

In addition, sacrifices to former emperors and kings were separated from the imperial sacrifices to the Heavens, and a special temple was built for them. This elevated the status of the monarch, as his rites were now distinct from all others. From the years 1532–1533, the Jiajing Emperor lost interest in ritual reforms and the worship of Heaven, as he was no longer able to elevate his own or his father's status. This led to a decline in the importance of ceremonies during his reign.

== Government and administration ==
=== Eunuchs ===
Important positions in the imperial palace were filled by eunuchs brought from Anlu by the Jiajing Emperor. As part of the dismissal of eunuchs associated with the previous monarch, some eunuch posts in the provinces were eliminated. The overall influence of eunuchs did not decrease; it continued to grow. By the 1530s, the most influential eunuchs saw themselves as equal to the grand secretaries. In 1548–1549, the roles of the head of the Eastern Depot and the Directorate of Ceremonial were combined, (Note: The Directorate of Ceremonial was the most influential of the eunuch offices of the Forbidden City, while the East Depot was the office of the eunuch secret police.) and the palace guard (established in 1552 and composed of eunuchs) was also under their control. This effectively placed the entire eunuch branch of state administration under their management.

=== Grand secretaries ===
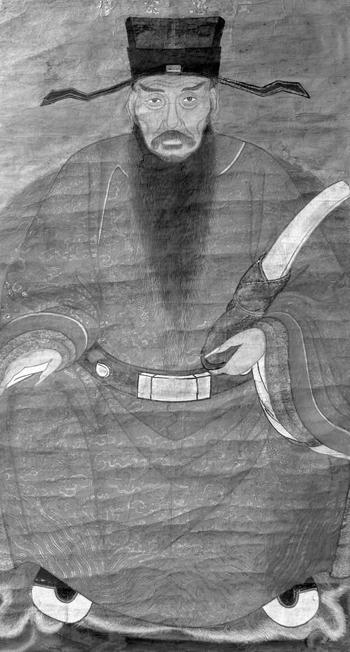
Zhang Cong, the Jiajing Emperor's grand secretary

After 1524, the Emperor's closest advisers were Zhang Cong and Gui E. They attempted to remove followers of Yang Tinghe, who were associated with the Hanlin Academy, from influential positions. This resulted in a purge of the Beijing authorities in 1527–1528 and a significant change in personnel at the academy. In addition, Zhang Cong and Gui E worked to limit the influence of Senior Grand Secretary Fei Hong in the Grand Secretariat. To achieve this, they brought back Yang Yiqing, who had previously served in the Grand Secretariat in 1515–1516. In the following years, there was a power struggle between the grand secretaries and their associated groups of officials. The position of senior grand secretary was constantly changing, with Fei, Yang, Zhang, and others taking turns.

In the early 1530s, the Jiajing Emperor's trust was won by Xia Yan, who had been promoted from minister of rites to grand secretary. Later, in the late 1530s, Yan Song, Xia Yan's successor in the ministry, also gained the Emperor's trust. Although Xia Yan initially supported Yan Song's rise, he eventually came into conflict with Yan. In 1542, Yan was able to oust Xia and take control of the Grand Secretariat. In an attempt to counterbalance Yan's influence, the Emperor called Xia back to lead the Grand Secretariat in October 1545, but the two statesmen were at odds, with Xia ignoring Yan, refusing to consult him, and canceling his appointment. The Emperor grew distant from Xia, partly due to his reserved attitude towards Taoist rituals and prayers. In contrast, Yan strongly supported the Emperor's interest in Taoism. In February 1548, Xia supported a campaign to Ordos without informing Yan, making him solely responsible for it. When the Emperor withdrew his support for the campaign due to unfavorable omens and reports of discontent in the neighboring province of Shaanxi, enemies of Xia, including Yan, used this as an opportunity to bring charges against him and have him executed.

From 1549 to 1562, the Grand Secretariat was under Yan Song's control. He was known for his attentiveness and diligence towards the monarch, but also for pushing his colleagues out of power. Despite facing numerous political crises and challenges, Yan managed to survive by delegating decisions and responsibilities to the appropriate ministries and authorities. For example, the Ministry of Rites was responsible for dealing with the Mongols, while the Ministry of War handled their expulsion. Yan avoided getting involved in the government's biggest issue at the time—state finances—leaving it to the Ministries of Revenue and Works. He only maintained control over personnel matters and selected political issues. Despite facing criticism for corruption and selling offices, Yan was able to convince the Emperor that these were false accusations and that his critics were simply trying to remove him from power. The Emperor, who was always suspicious of officials, believed Yan's defense.

Yan, who was already 80 years old in 1560, was unable to continue his role as grand secretary. This was especially true after his wife died in 1561 and his son, who had been assisting him with writing edicts, went home to organize the funeral. To make matters worse, he faced opposition from his subordinate, Grand Secretary Xu Jie. The Emperor no longer relied on Yan and dismissed him in June 1562. Xu Jie then took over as the head of the Grand Secretariat.

With the personnel changes in the immediate surroundings of the Emperor, the focus and style of his policies also shifted. During the first phase of his reign, the Jiajing Emperor placed great importance on ceremonies, which were seen as essential in maintaining order and promoting a sense of superiority over non-Chinese peoples, according to Confucian beliefs. The refinement and organization of these ceremonies aimed to showcase the Ming dynasty as a model for surrounding countries and the world. The Emperor received significant assistance from his senior grand secretary, Zhang Cong. However, during Xia Yan's dominance in the Grand Secretariat, the Emperor withdrew from the Forbidden City to the West Park, neglecting his public duties but still maintaining control over the government. During this time, Ming China used military force to intimidate neighboring countries, successfully in the case of Đại Việt, but falling in the attempt to recapture Ordos, resulting in Xia's death in 1548. In the following period, during the conflicts of the 1550s in the north and on the coast, Yan Song pursued a policy of compromise and negotiation, which was accompanied by corruption. After the fall of Yan Song in 1562, the Emperor's interest in good governance was rekindled under the influence of the capable and energetic grand secretary, Xu Jie. Thus, the Jiajing Emperor's rule after the overthrow of Yang Tinghe can be divided into four phases: Zhang Cong's strict adherence to ideology, Xia Yan's aggressive expansionism, Yan Song's complacent corruption, and Xu Jie's corrective reforms.

=== Organization of the government ===
One important aspect of the decision-making process since the beginning of the Ming dynasty had been the system of interdepartmental consultation among high officials. Memoranda and proposals were submitted for debate to the "nine ministers", as well as to generals of the Central Military Commissions and other officials. The result of these discussions was then presented to the Emperor for a final decision. The grand secretaries were responsible for organizing the circulation of these memoranda but did not have the authority to make decisions. The Jiajing Emperor emphasized the importance of discussing important decisions at court and encouraged officials to express their opinions, particularly in the case of high-ranking government officials, to the obligee.

In the early Ming period, this system often served to justify the emperors' decisions (especially after the crisis of 1380), as there was no social basis for diverse attitudes, but as the crises of the mid-15th century emerged, the situation changed, and the need for political changes became apparent. The emergence of officials with merchant-family backgrounds also provided a basis for assessing problems from different perspectives. Officials used this system to debate, build support networks, lobby for their own interests, push opponents out of office, and sometimes even sabotage their policies.

=== Assassination attempts and relocation to the West Park ===
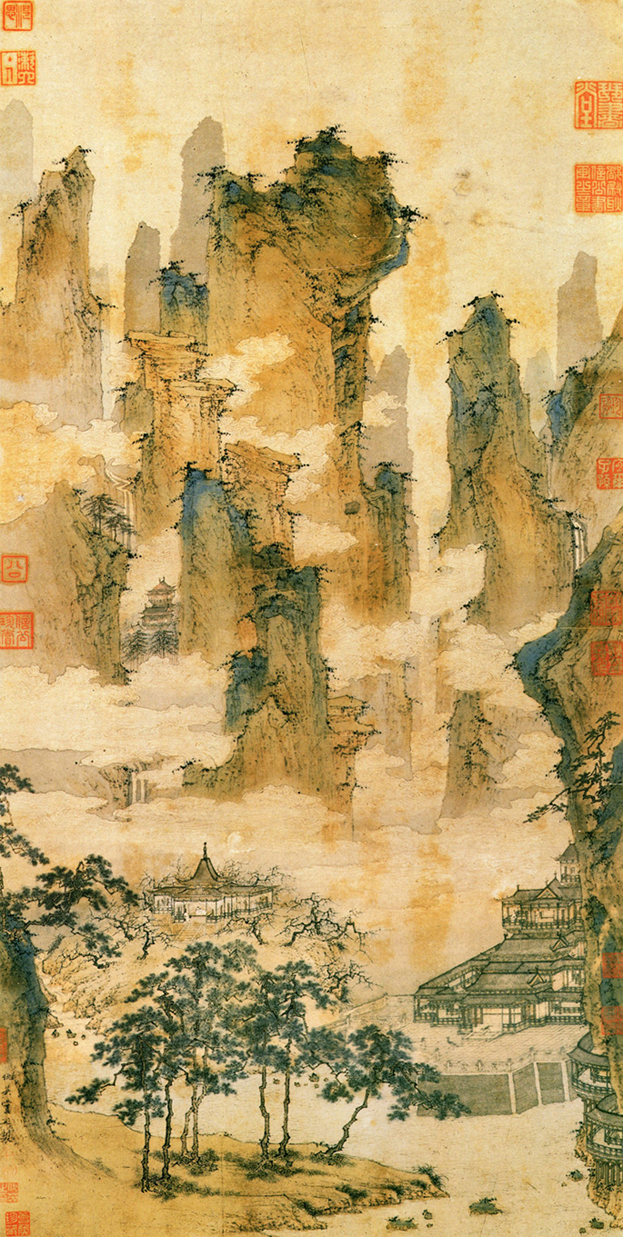
Qiu Ying: Pavilions in the Mountains of the Immortals, 1550, National Palace Museum, Taipei

The Emperor's harsh treatment of dissenters earned him many opponents and led to multiple attempts on his life. In 1539, while traveling to Anlu, his temporary residences were repeatedly set on fire. The most serious incident occurred on 27 November 1542, when a group of palace women attempted to strangle him. When the Emperor had fallen asleep in one of his concubines' quarters, a serving girl led several palace women to start strangling him with a silk cord. However, one of the palace women panicked and alerted the eunuchs, who then informed Empress Fang. The Emperor eventually woke up after being unconscious for eight hours but was unable to speak. Empress Fang ordered the execution of all women involved in the assassination attempt, both those who were actually involved and those who were falsely accused. The motives of the palace women are unclear, but possibly the Emperor's cruel treatment of them, driven by his pursuit of a longer life, may have played a role.

After the assassination attempt, the Emperor completely withdrew from the formal life of the court and the Forbidden City. He moved to the Yongshou Palace (Palace of Eternal Life) in the West Park of the Imperial City, where he occasionally stayed starting in 1539. The West Park was located in the western third of the Imperial City, separated from it and the Forbidden City by a system of three lakes called Taiye Lake. These lakes stretched over two kilometers from north to south and occupied half of the park's area. The Emperor built West Park to be a complex where he could live and seek immortality. Since the beginning of the Ming dynasty, West Park has been seen as a symbol of the Lands of Immortals. The Jiajing Emperor, who was fascinated by Taoism and the concept of immortality, was intrigued by this and attempted to reconstruct the site in accordance with contemporary beliefs about the Lands of Immortals. He aligned the names of the palaces and the attire of the servants and officials with Taoist symbolism, and Taoist ceremonies were performed there. Animals were also kept, and plants were grown for divination purposes. After the Emperor's death, most of the buildings he had constructed were demolished, leaving only one temple, Dagaoxian dian, which still stands today.

After 1542, the Emperor never resided in his palace in the Forbidden City. This relocation to the West Park also resulted in the transfer of the administrative center of the empire, further isolating the Emperor from the bureaucracy. As early as 1534, he ceased holding imperial audiences. Instead, his decisions were conveyed to the ministries and other authorities through a select group of advisors who had direct access to him. This group included the grand secretaries, the minister of rites, and several military commanders. The discontinuation of audiences did not indicate a lack of interest in governing; the Emperor diligently read reports and submissions from officials and often worked late into the night.

=== Taoist pursuits ===
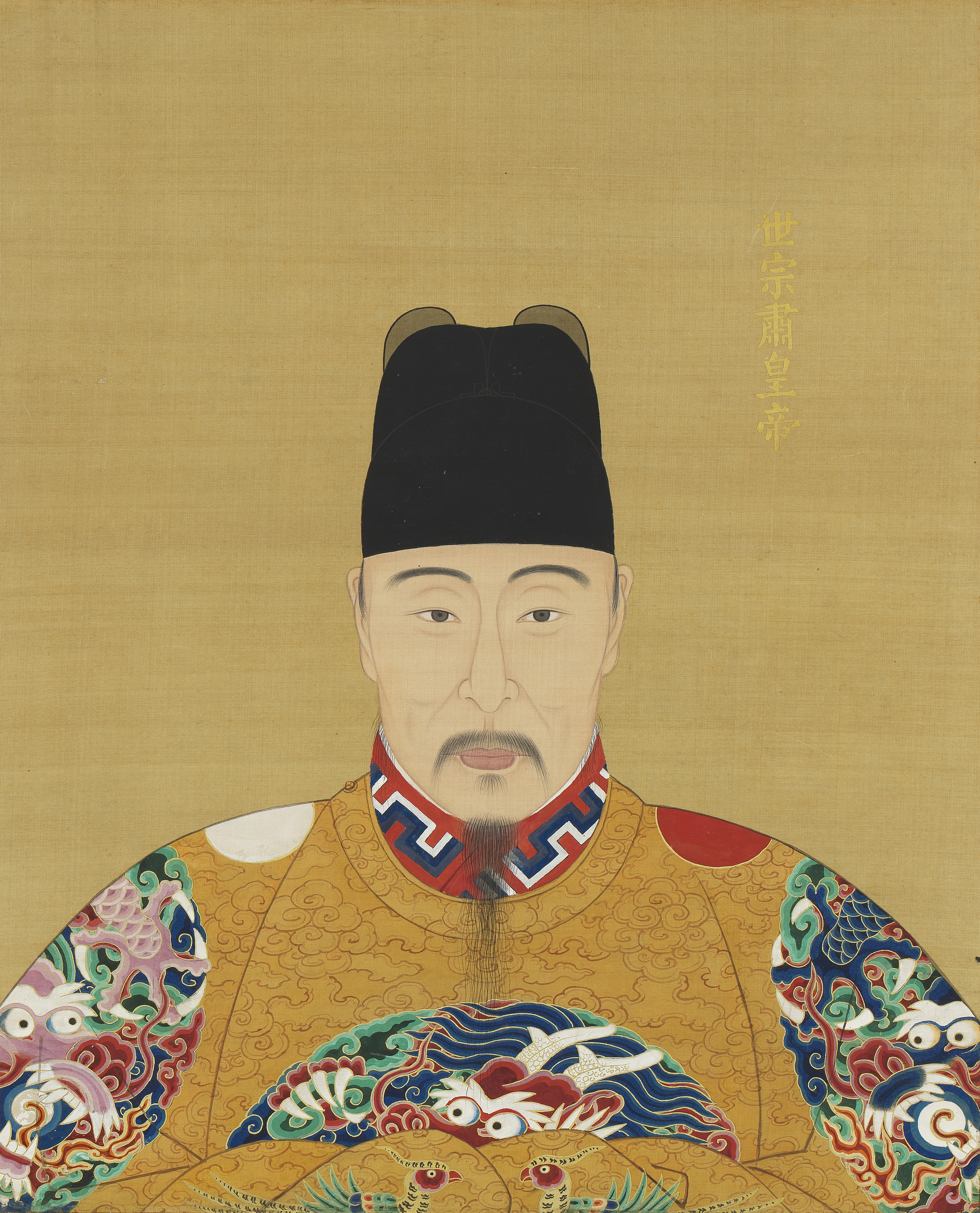
Portrait of the Jiajing Emperor

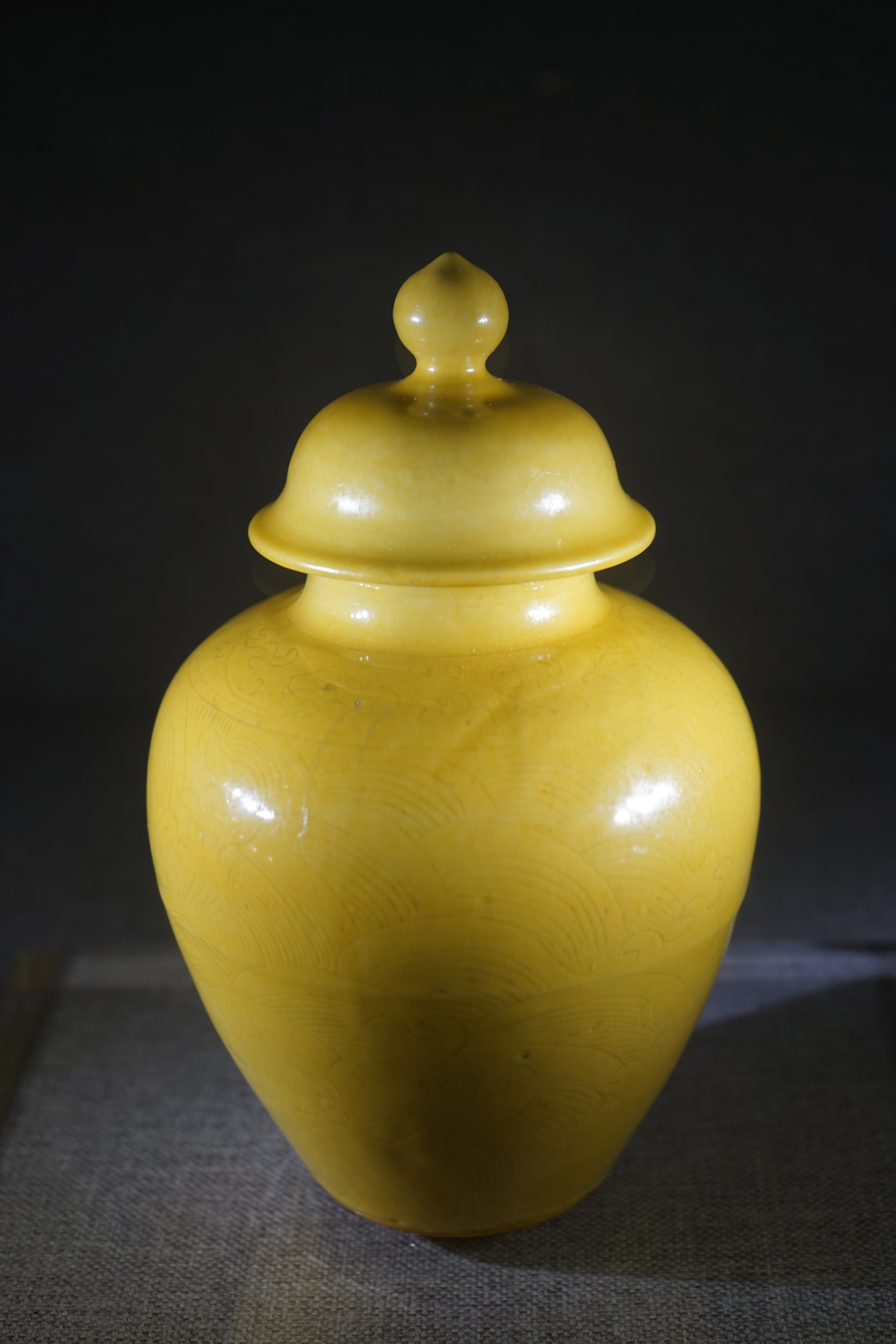
Yellow glazed pot and cover with hidden streak designs from the official kiln. Jiajing era. Excavated from Dadao tomb, Huangzhou.

From the beginning of his reign, the Jiajing Emperor was drawn to the Taoist faith, with its focus on supernaturalism and the pursuit of immortality. This may have been influenced by his childhood spent in Huguang, whose people were known for their superstitious beliefs. The Jiajing Emperor's support of Taoism was not without limits. In 1527, Grand Secretary Yang Yiqing, along with ministers Gui E, Fang Xianfu, and Huo Tao, proposed stricter regulations on the establishment of new Taoist and Buddhist temples and monasteries. They also suggested the abolition of nunneries and temples, the confiscation of their property, and the return of Buddhist and Taoist nuns and priests to secular life. (Note: The event was motivated by the desire for moral reform in society. Monasteries were seen as places where people gathered for sexual purposes by ministers.) The Emperor signed the decree that was prepared. (Note: According to the proposal, the old priestesses were to be relocated to the Baoming ('Protecting the Ming [dynasty]') Temple near Beijing. The Emperor agreed, rejecting the idea that the "witch-priestess" presented to Baoming Temple could protect the dynasty. The abolition of this temple faced protests from the two empress dowagers: his mother Lady Jiang and his aunt Lady Zhang. As a faithful son and nephew, the Emperor was unable to oppose their wishes, and the temple was preserved. The close relationships between the temple, eunuchs, and women of the imperial palace played a role in the intervention of the empress dowagers.) As the Emperor had no heir in the first ten years of his reign, some high-ranking officials suggested that Taoist prayers and rituals could solve the problem. This piqued his interest, which only intensified after the assassination attempt in 1542.

The Jiajing Emperor spared no expense or time for Taoist ceremonies. The Taoists requested, among other things, tens of kilograms of gold dust for their prayers. The Emperor even had temples built for them, which required a lot of wood to be transported from distant Sichuan. Additionally, he gave them valuable items. Among the Taoists, Shao Yuanjie was particularly favored by the Emperor starting in 1526. Shao was known for his prayers for rain and protection against calamities. After the births of the Emperor's sons in 1533 and 1536, he was highly honored. Shao died in 1539 and was replaced by Tao Zhongwen. Tao further strengthened the Emperor's faith in Taoism and gained respect for himself by accurately predicting a fire on the way south to Anlu. In order to prolong the Emperor's life, Tao offered him aphrodisiacs and elixirs of immortality made from red lead and white arsenic. In September 1540, the Emperor announced his plans to withdraw into private life in the coming years to seek immortality. This caused great concern among officials, who criticized the preparations as toxic. Those who openly criticized the Emperor were executed, and in the following decades, he slowly consumed the elixirs.

After 1545, the Emperor began to rely on oracles for guidance in state affairs. These oracles were organized by Tao, who had control over their results. Yan Song also participated in divination, seeing it as an opportunity to influence politics in a favorable direction. The Emperor's pursuit of immortality included engaging in sexual relations with young girls, of which he and Tao collected 960 for this purpose. He also called on officials throughout the country to search for and send magical herbs. After Tao's death in November 1560, the Emperor struggled to find a Taoist adept who could meet his needs.

In addition to Taoist prayers, the literary form of qingci (青詞), a poetic style of prayer full of allusions, was revived and developed. The Emperor's favor with officials was often based on their skill in writing in this style, rather than their statesmanship. Yan Song and Xia Yan, who were particularly skilled in this style, were often referred to contemptuously as qingci zaixiang (青詞宰相; 'Qingci premiers'). (Note: Through their skill in writing qingci prayers, Grand Secretary Gu Dingchen (顧鼎臣, 1473–1540) and ministers Yuan Wei (袁煒, 1508–1565), Li Chunfang (李春芳, jinshi 1547), Yan Na (嚴訥, 1511–1584), and Guo Pu (郭朴) were able to gain access to high-ranking positions.)

== Economy ==
=== Natural disasters and the economy ===
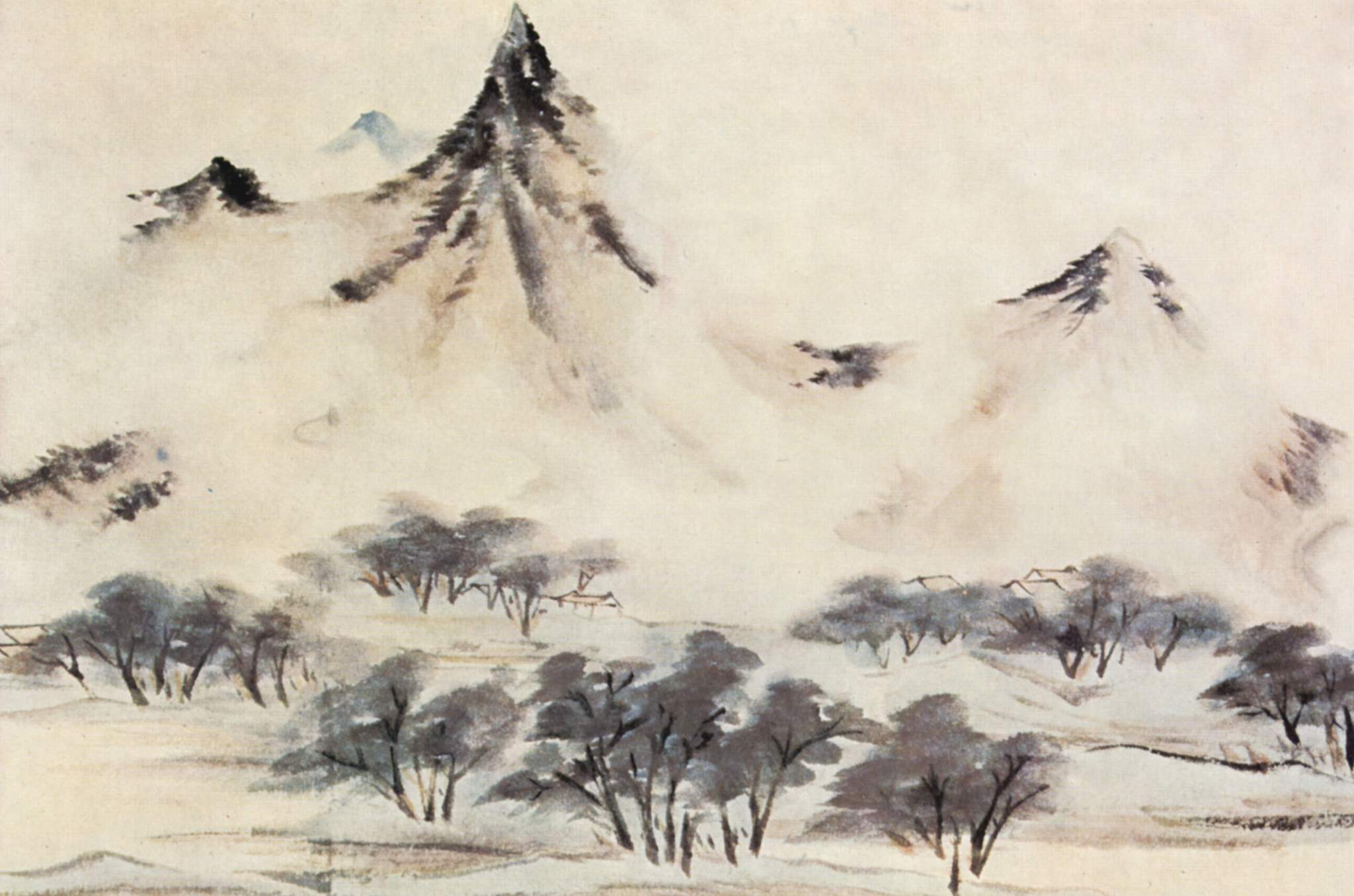
Chen Chun: Mountains in Clouds, 1535, Freer Gallery of Art, Washington, DC

During the reign of the Jiajing Emperor, the climate was cooler and wetter compared to previous years, but towards the end of his reign, there were warmer winters. Temperatures were 1.5 degrees lower than in the second half of the 20th century. The south and north of China were affected by floods, while the Yangtze River basin experienced severe drought. In 1528, the worst drought of the entire Ming era hit Zhejiang, Shanxi, Shaanxi, and Hubei, resulting in the death of half of the population in some areas of Henan and Jiangnan. Jiangnan continued to suffer from droughts, epidemics, rains, and famines until the late 1540s.

Earthquakes were also a frequent occurrence in the Jiajing era, with many recorded in various areas. For instance, in the span of ten months from July 1523 to May 1524, there were 38 recorded earthquakes. In Nanjing alone, there were fifteen in just one month in 1525. The most devastating earthquake occurred on 23 January 1556, affecting the provinces of Shaanxi, Shanxi, and Henan. In Shaanxi, entire regions such as Weinan, Huazhou, Chaoyi, and Sanyuan were left in ruins. The Yellow River and the Wei River also overflowed, and some areas experienced tremors for several days. The disaster claimed the lives of 830,000 people, including several former ministers. The affected areas were granted tax forgiveness for several years. Despite these natural disasters, the first half of the 16th century saw significant economic growth in agriculture and crafts, but the state struggled to collect taxes, particularly from newly cultivated land, trade, and handicraft production. The quotas and revenues set a century earlier were not met.

=== New crops from America ===
During the Jiajing era, Chinese peasants began to expand their agricultural crops to include species native to Central and South America. In the 1530s, groundnut cultivation was documented in Jiangnan, having spread there from Fujian. Fujian peasants acquired this crop from Portuguese sailors. Sweet potatoes were documented in Yunnan at the beginning of the 1560s, having arrived via Burma. Their presence on the southeast coast (Fujian and Guangdong) was only mentioned by authors of the time in the last decades of the 16th century, during the Wanli era. Maize cultivation was documented as early as the 1550s in inland Henan, but it was most likely acquired from Europeans several decades earlier. It was also sent by Yunnan natives to Beijing as part of tribute before the mid-16th century. (Note: Maize may have appeared in China as early as 1505, when the book Bencao Pinhui Jingyao was presented to the Hongzhi Emperor, containing a description and image of this "new crop", as also mentioned in the Annals of Yingzhou in 1511.) Maize was not well-liked by the Han people and its cultivation remained the concern of minority peoples in southwest China for nearly three centuries. It was only in the 18th century that it began to be grown on a larger scale in Han-populated regions.

=== State finances at the beginning of the Jiajing Emperor's reign ===
Upon the accession of the Jiajing Emperor, Yang Tinghe implemented a program of severe austerity. This followed the significant increase in the number of state-paid dignitaries during the previous century. The number of officers rose from less than 13,000 at the beginning of the Hongwu era (1368–1398) to 28,000 by the end, and eventually reached 100,000 in 1520; many of them lived in and around the capital. Many of these officers were surplus and did not actively serve in the military. The same was true for civil servants, resulting in a total of around 4 million dan of grain being imported to Beijing each year to support the needs of civil servants, soldiers, and officers. This grain was distributed at a rate of 1 dan (107.4 liters) per person per month, providing for approximately 300,000 individuals. In 1522, Yang took decisive action by cutting off payments to 148,700 supernumerary and honorary officers and officials, resulting in an annual reduction of 1.5 million dan of grain in state expenditure. This move proved to be beneficial in the mid-16th century, as the savings allowed the authorities to convert the 1.5 million dan of grain tax into a silver tax, greatly improving the state's finances.

=== State finances in the 1540s–1560s ===
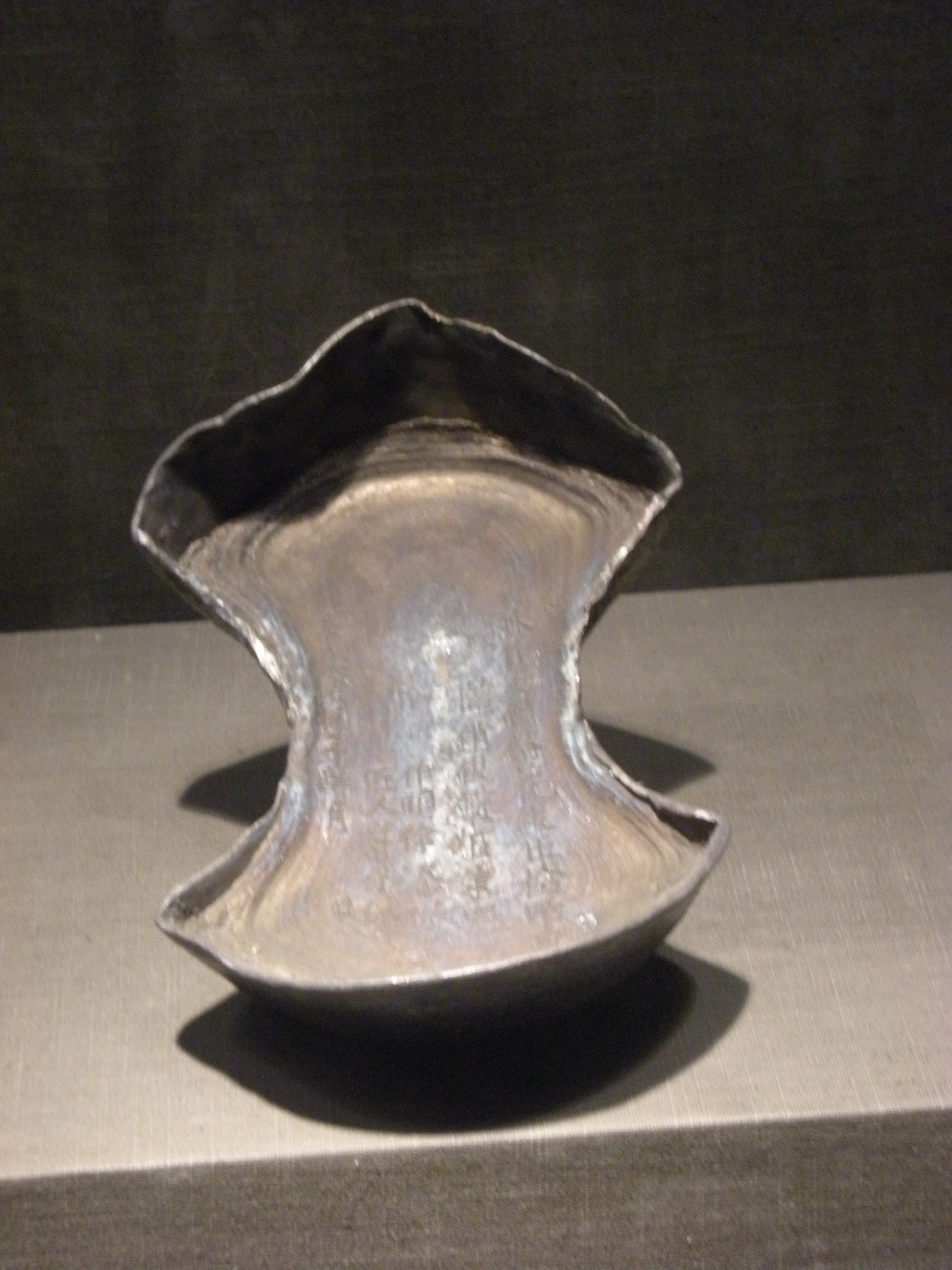
A silver ingot from the Ming dynasty, on display at the Hubei Provincial Museum, Wuhan

In the mid-1520s, despite efforts to save money, the state's financial situation remained problematic. The costly construction projects during the early years of the Jiajing era had depleted the grain supplies from 8–9 years' worth of expenditure to only 3 years, as well as the silver reserves that had been accumulated in the 1520s. In 1540, the Minister of Revenue was dismissed for refusing to agree to an increase in the number of workers on public works, which already numbered 40,000. He argued that the cost of reconstructing palaces, ceremonial altars, and temples had already reached 6 million liang (224 tons) of silver since the beginning of the Jiajing Emperor's reign, and that he did not have the means to sustain such a pace of construction. While the Emperor did cancel some projects, the most expensive buildings in the West Park were not among them.

The revenue of the Taicang treasury, (Note: The Taicang treasury (太倉庫; 'National Silver Vault'), established in 1442, served as the state treasury for storing tax revenues collected in silver.) which consisted of the Ministry of Revenue's income in silver, averaged 2 million liang (74.6 tons) per year after 1532. Out of this amount, 1.3 million liang was allocated for border defense. In the 1540s, the annual silver expenditure increased to 3.47 million liang, resulting in a deficit of 1.4 million liang. The Ministry of Revenue attempted to address this issue by implementing stricter monitoring of income and expenses, as well as requiring final accounts to be presented at the end of each year. Despite these efforts, the deficits persisted. In 1541, 1.2 million dan of grain surplus, which was a result of Yang Tinghe's austerity measures, were converted into silver payments. This decision was later revoked after five years, but was eventually reinstated. This led to an increase in the annual revenue of the Taicang treasury from 2 million to more than 3 million liang in the early 1550s. From 1540 onwards, the conversion of taxes from grain to silver became widespread, although the specific proportion and method of conversion varied among different counties.

In the 1550s, state expenditures, both regular and extraordinary, increased significantly. The cost of maintaining military garrisons on the northern border doubled, and the state faced additional financial burdens due to the earthquake of 1556 and the fire that destroyed three audience palaces and the southern gate of the Forbidden City in 1557. The reconstruction of these palaces took five years and cost hundreds of thousands of liang of silver. In 1561, the Emperor's palace in the West Park, which had also been recently rebuilt, burned down again. During this time, the state's annual expenditure in silver ranged from 3 to 6 million liang, while the proper revenue was only around 3 million liang. To make up for the shortfall, the state resorted to extraordinary taxes, savings, and even transfers from the Emperor's personal treasury, which often left it completely depleted. (Note: State expenditures were funded through the revenues of the Emperor's private property, which became a regular practice. From 1543 to 1558, the Emperor allocated 1 million liang of silver annually in this manner.) In 1552, the Minister of Revenue proposed an additional tax of two million liang to be imposed on the wealthy prefectures of Jiangnan. The Emperor agreed and this procedure was repeated, but during the 1550s, Jiangnan was frequently attacked by pirates and also suffered from natural disasters, making it difficult to collect even the usual taxes. The local authorities were exhausted and lacked the resources to deal with floods and crop failures, and the government did not respond until the situation became dire and refugees, along with epidemics, appeared on the streets of Beijing. To fund military operations in southeastern China, taxes were levied in the affected regions, often in the form of labor surcharges. These taxes remained in place until some of them (totaling 400–500 thousand liang) were abolished in 1562.

Savings and frugality also had negative consequences. In 1560, the market price of rice doubled to 0.8 liang of silver per dan, leading to a revolt by the Nanjing garrison. To appease them, 40 thousand liang (1492 kg) of silver was distributed, and the soldiers were not punished.

Another issue was the salaries of members of the imperial family, which exceeded 8.5 million dan of grain in the early 1560s and were still insufficient for the large number of family members. This problem was brought to the attention of the Emperor, who discussed it but took no action. In 1564, 140 members of the imperial family gathered in front of the governor's residence in Shaanxi to demand payment of their arrears, which amounted to over 600,000 dan of grain, but the local authorities were only able to collect 78,000 liang of silver. The Emperor excluded those involved from the imperial family, but the issue persisted.

=== Land tax reforms ===
The government's need for silver revenue prompted the implementation of the single whip reform, beginning in the south-east coast where there was a surplus of silver due to the flourishing trade industry. From the 1530s to the 1570s, the primary source of silver for China was western Japan, where new deposits were found. In the 1550s and 1560s, Chinese merchants faced restricted access to Japan due to conflicts on the Chinese coast. The Portuguese took on the role of intermediary between Japan and China.

The reforms, known as the "single whip reform", encompassed a variety of measures that were implemented in different locations and combinations. These measures included the replacement of taxpayers with compulsory labor for land assignments, the introduction of annual payments instead of the previous ten-year levy cycle of the lijia system, the substitution of compulsory labor tax payments, the consolidation of various fees and mandatory services into a single payment, and the simplification of land categorization. In 1522, a new method of calculating taxes was implemented (initially in one county). This method took into account the fertility of newly fertilized land and the conversion of field area to fiscal mu, making it easier for taxpayers to calculate their taxes. This method became popular in both the north and south, but the government had mixed feelings about it. On one hand, it simplified the tax calculation process, but on the other hand, it relied on lower-ranking officials who were known for their corrupt practices. The government would sometimes support and other times ban this method. The adjustments and equalization of taxes also had a positive impact on land prices and market activity. In some cases, the implementation of new local cadastres led to households acquiring land registers, replacing the outdated Yellow Registers.

== Culture ==
=== Philosophy ===
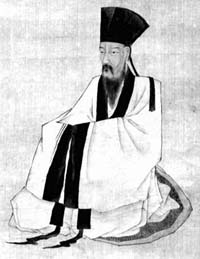
Portrait of Wang Yangming

During the early years of the Jiajing Emperor's reign, the statesman and philosopher Wang Yangming (d. 1529) was in the last years of his life. Although he did not participate in the rites dispute, his disciples were sympathetic towards the Emperor's "following of the inner moral voice". Despite his previous success in quelling the rebellion of the Prince of Ning, Wang had been dismissed from his position in the civil service under the Zhengde Emperor. In 1525, the Minister of Rites, Xi Shu, proposed his reinstatement due to his exceptional reputation as a statesman. This proposal faced opposition from the grand secretaries Gui E and Yang Yiqing, whose influence would diminish with Wang's return to Beijing. They suggested sending him to the southeast to suppress the rebellion in Guangxi.

Wang Yangming's new concept of Neo-Confucian philosophy, centered on the concept of xin (heart/mind), was met with criticism from representatives of the official Zhusist orthodoxy. His teachings were banned and he was only rehabilitated in 1567, after the death of the Jiajing Emperor, but despite this setback, his ideas continued to spread throughout the country. As his teachings gained popularity, his followers formed various regional schools. The Jiangzhou school, led by figures such as Luo Hongxian, Zuo Shouyi (鄒守益), Ouyang De, and Nie Bao, provided the most accurate interpretation of Wang's ideas. The Taizhou school, on the other hand, led by Wang Gen, He Xinyin, and others, took a more radical approach.

Some Neo-Confucians disagreed with the views of either Wang Yangming or Zhu Xi on the origin of the universe. Instead, they focused on elaborating the concept of qi. For example, Wang Tingxiang drew inspiration from the ideas of Zhang Zai of Song and Xue Xuan (薛瑄) of Ming. He argued that the universe did not arise from the principle of li, but from the primordial energy of qi (yuan qi). Similarly, Luo Qinshun believed that energy was the primordial force, while principle served as the source of order and regularity. Both of these thinkers aimed to shift philosophy from moralizing to empiricism, a direction that would become prevalent in Chinese Confucianism a century later during the early Qing period.

=== Painting and calligraphy ===
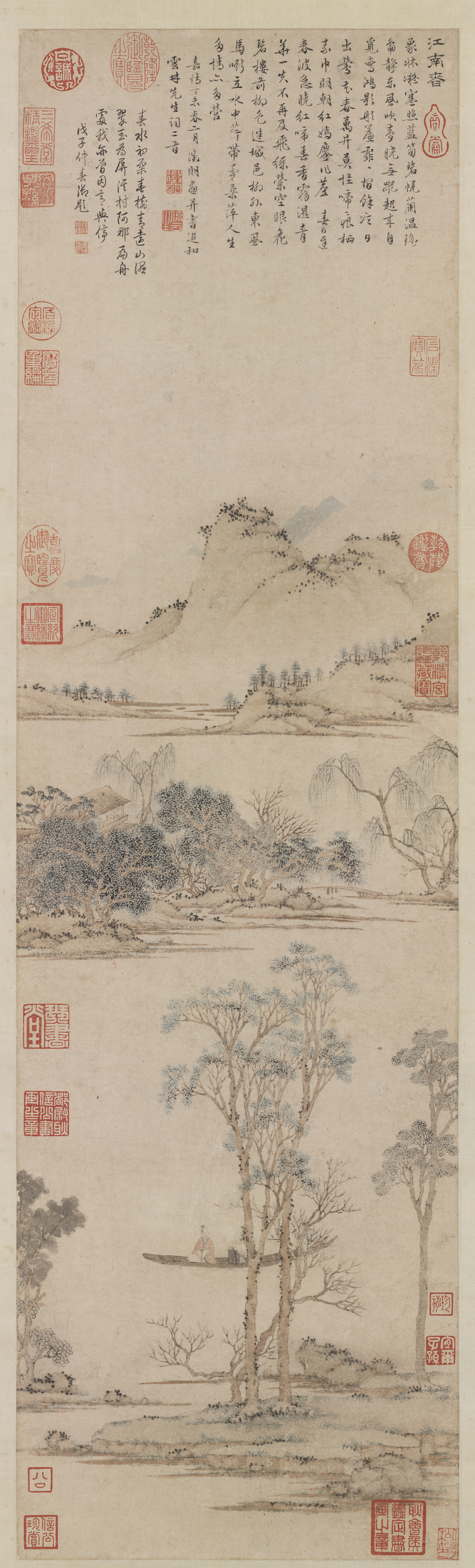
Wen Zhengming: Spring in Jiangnan, detail of the lower half of the painting, 1547, National Palace Museum, Taipei

During the Jiajing era, the epicenter of artistic creativity was in the wealthy Jiangnan region, particularly in Suzhou. This area attracted intellectuals who prioritized artistic self-expression over pursuing an official career. These intellectuals were known as the Wu School, named after the region's old name. The most prominent and representative painters of the Wu School were Wen Zhengming and Chen Chun. Wen Zhengming was a master of poetry, calligraphy, and painting. He was known for his monochrome or lightly colored landscapes in the style of Shen Zhou, as well as his "blue-green landscapes" in the Tang style. He is credited with reviving the tradition of southern amateur painting. Chen Chun, a disciple of Wen Zhengming, brought originality to the genre of flowers and birds. He was also renowned for his conceptual writing as a calligrapher. Wen Zhengming had many disciples and followers, including his sons Wen Peng and Wen Jia, who were both painters. Wen Peng, in addition to his skills in conceptual writing, gained recognition for his seal carving. Other notable painters from the Wu School include Wen Zhengming's relative Wen Boren, as well as Qian Gu and Lu Zhi.

Many artists, such as Qiu Ying and Xu Wei, were influenced by the Wu school but did not belong to it. They worked in Suzhou and its surrounding areas. Qiu Ying was part of the conservative wing of the Southern tradition, while Xu Wei broke away from this conservative expression. His paintings are characterized by a deliberate carelessness and simplification of form, resulting in exceptional credibility and expressiveness in his compositions. Qiu's works were more popular among the general public than the work of scholars and officials, known as literary painting. Merchants often signed paintings in his name, even if they were far from his style.

=== Poetry, drama ===
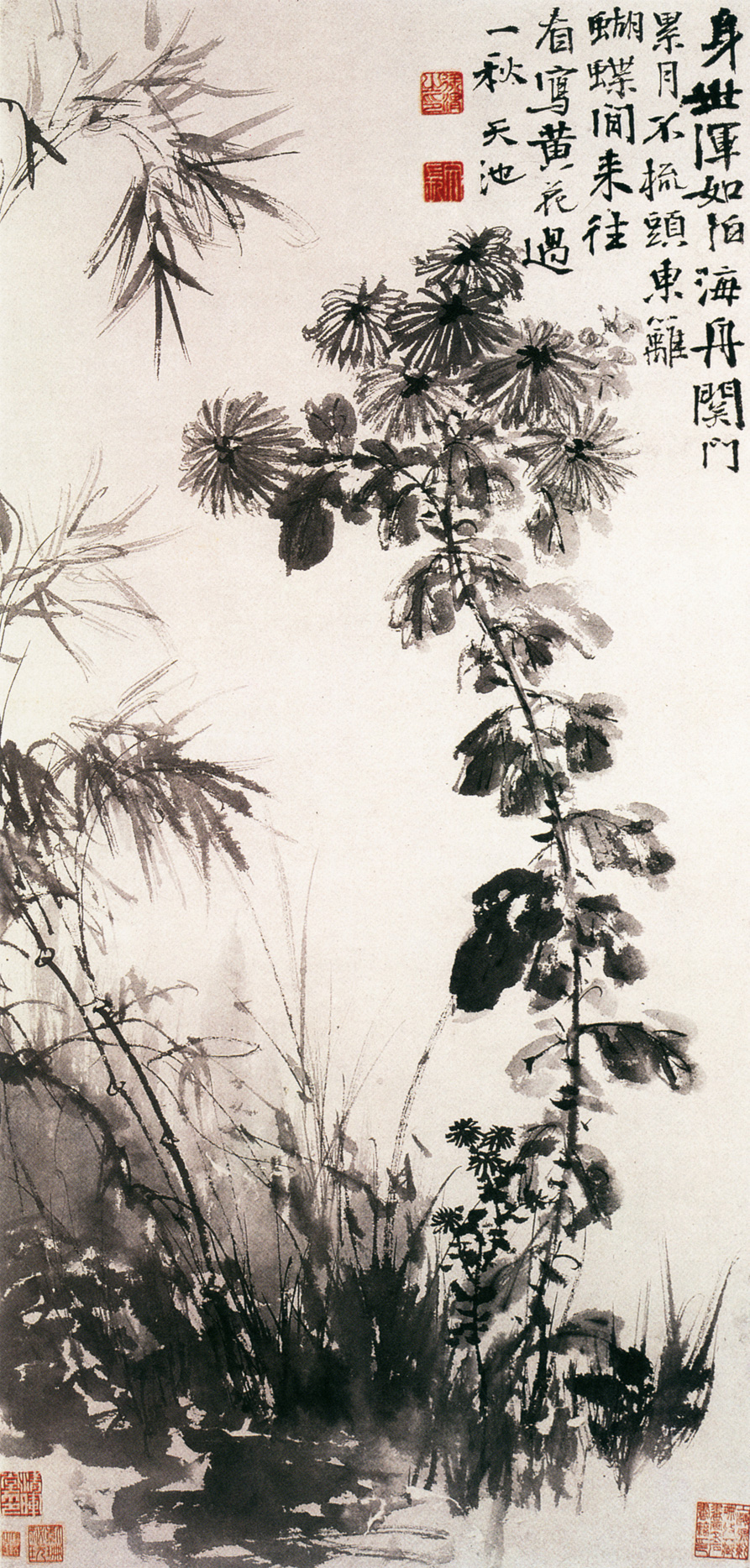
Xu Wei, Chrysanthemums and Bamboos, 16th century, Liaoning Provincial Museum, Shenyang

The direction of literary development in the previous Zhengde era and the beginning of the Jiajing era was determined by the Earlier Seven Masters, led by Li Mengyang and He Jingming, including Wang Tingxiang. Their main objective was to break away from the traditional cabinet-style poetry of the 15th century, which they believed lacked expression and emotion due to its adherence to conventions. Instead, they looked to Han and Qin prose, as well as Tang and older poetry, particularly from the peak Tang period, as their models. This trend continued into the 16th century with the emergence of Xie Zhen, the first of the Latter Seven Masters. Li Panlong led the Latter Seven Masters, with Wang Shizhen being considered the greatest poet among them.

Both the Earlier and Latter Seven Masters had a significant influence on the poets of Ming China, and their poetic style remained popular for many decades, but some literati believed that their principles were too restrictive, leading to mere imitation without any originality. One such poet was Xue Hui (薛蕙), as well as Yang Tinghe's son, Yang Shen, whose work gained many admirers. Yang Shen's most prized collection of poems was the one he exchanged with his wife, Huang E, who was also a talented poet, while he was living in exile after 1524. Despite the prevailing trend of admiration for "Tang poetry and Han prose," the Eight Talents of the Jiajing era stood out by modeling their writing after the authors of the Tang and Song dynasties. The most notable among the Eight Talents were Li Kaixian, Wang Shenzhong, and Tang Shunzhi.

In the genre of northern zayu plays, Kang Hai and Wang Jiusi were important dramatists. Following them, Li Kaixian focused on drama, publishing Yuan zayu and composing plays in the southern style of chuanqi. Xu Wei, the most renowned Ming author of zayu, followed in his footsteps, but Li Kaixian's generation was the last to excel in northern drama, as the plays of the south began to dominate.

== Military and foreign policy ==
=== Turpan ===
In 1513, Mansur, the Sultan of Turpan, invaded Hami and caused destruction in the Chinese territories to the east. Sayyid Husayn, who was Mansur's envoy in Beijing, negotiated a deal where Mansur would keep Hami and the (tribute) trade would be reinstated. In 1521, Sayyid was executed for treason and the Turpan delegation was expelled from Beijing. This led to a hostile attitude towards Turpan, enforced by Yang Tinghe. Fighting resumed and in 1524, the Turpans also attacked Ganzhou. Ming troops, mostly composed of Mongols, successfully defended against the attackers, but the conflict continued until 1528 when Mansur returned to a strategy of small raids.

In 1528, the western border once again became a point of contention. Ilan, one of Mansur's generals, sought asylum in Ming territory. Mansur demanded his extradition in exchange for Hami. Additionally, he requested the resumption of trade, which had been halted in 1524. Wang Qiong, minister of war in charge of the western borders, along with Zhang Cong and Gui E, supported the resumption of trade, but there were voices of opposition, arguing that showing leniency without a formal apology would not be beneficial in the long run. Despite this, the Emperor ultimately decided to grant Mansur's request. The western border was pacified, and the Ming government was able to focus on dealing with the increasingly aggressive Mongols, who had become more hostile after 1528.

=== Đại Việt ===
In 1537, a debate erupted at the Ming court regarding Đại Việt (present-day northern Vietnam). In Đại Việt, Mạc Đăng Dung had overthrown the Lê dynasty in 1527 and established the Mạc dynasty. He later abdicated in favor of his son, Mạc Thái Tông. The debate was sparked by the birth of the Emperor's son in November 1536, when messages were sent to neighboring countries to share the joyous news. Grand Secretary Xia Yan refused to include Đại Việt in these messages, citing the country's failure to send tribute for the past twenty years and the illegitimacy of Mạc Thái Tông. The Minister of War and the militarist faction in the government, led by Guo Xun (郭勛), Marquis of Wuding, proposed a punitive expedition. This proposal was met with criticism for being extravagant and costly. Yan Song also spoke out against the proposal.

In March 1537, envoys from Lê Trang Tông, who was enthroned by Lê loyalists, arrived in Beijing seeking assistance against the Mạc dynasty. The Jiajing Emperor responded by sending officials to investigate the situation, which he perceived as an affront to his majesty. He initially considered military action, but local authorities in Guangdong objected, arguing that the Viets had not crossed the border and the outcome of their civil war was uncertain. Despite these protests, a decision was made in May to go to war, but after further objections from regional officials, the Emperor began to waver and ultimately cancelled military preparations in June. In September 1537, new proposals from the other local officials convinced him to resume preparations for war.

In the spring of 1538, the Jiajing Emperor appointed a campaign commander, but after the border authorities calculated the expected costs and problems of the war and the Ministry of War responded to the Emperor's inquiry by submitting the matter to inter-ministerial consultations, the Emperor ultimately decided to cancel the war. However, the gathering of 110,000 troops in Guangxi during preparations for war alarmed Mạc Đăng Dung. In an attempt to avert an invasion, Mạc Đăng Dung ceded disputed border territories to the Ming Empire and accepted the subordinate status of his state in 1540. The episode left the Jiajing Emperor with the impression that his officials were more concerned with their personal interests than the well-being of the state and that they were unable to come up with a sound policy. By 1540, the Emperor had become increasingly isolated from his government.

=== The Mongols ===
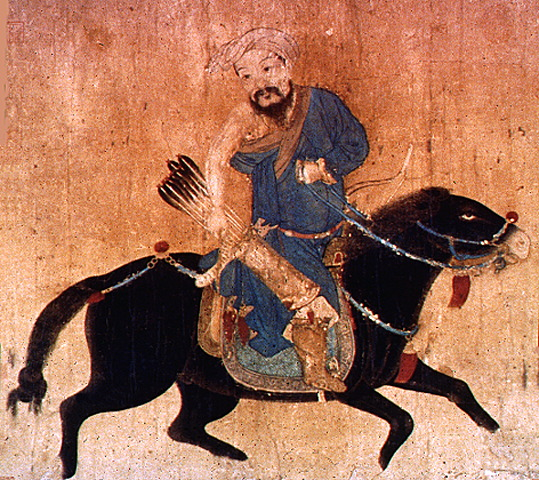
A Mongolian mounted archer depicted in a Chinese miniature from the Ming dynasty, Victoria and Albert Museum, London

Internal conflicts among the Mongols meant that the Jiajing Emperor's government did not have much to worry about in the first decade of his reign, and their raids were rare. The Ming army itself, however, posed a significant problem. As early as the 16th century, difficulties in the border garrisons were on the rise. In 1510, soldiers killed the governor of Ningxia, and in 1521, the governor of Gansu met the same fate. In August 1524, officers and soldiers in Datong killed the governor and burned government buildings. Although the unrest was temporarily quelled by the execution of the rebellion's leaders in April 1525, the Datong rebellion, which was linked to the death of the garrison commander, resurfaced in 1533. Smaller rebellions also occurred in 1535 and 1539, and in 1545, members of the imperial family also rose up. The government's response to these rebellions was typically to make concessions, which ultimately failed to address the underlying issues.

After the political situation in Mongolia stabilized, the Mongols began to stage raids on Ming territory every spring and early autumn. These raids were often successful due to the incapacitation of Ming garrisons, making them an effective substitute for trade for the Mongols. In contrast to Đại Việt, the Emperor showed a clear preference for using force in his relations with the Mongols and rejected proposals to restore trade. However, Altan Khan, who solidified his rule over the Mongols in the steppes west and south of the Gobi Desert in the 1540s, desired Chinese goods. His attacks on Ming territory were motivated by his need for funds to wage war against the Oirats, as well as supplies to alleviate the effects of droughts and famines in the 1540s and 1550s.

The Ming troops were successful in defending against smaller raids, but they were unable to stop large-scale Mongol attacks involving tens of thousands of horsemen. By the time enough forces were gathered, the Mongols had already retreated back to the steppe. The Ming government focused on strengthening their defenses and building fortifications, for which the Emperor was willing to allocate significant funds. They also worked on improving discipline and intelligence activities, but they failed to address the root causes of these raids.

During the 1540s and 1550s, Altan Khan repeatedly requested the restoration of trade, but the Emperor refused, leading the Mongols to resort to force in order to obtain the resources they needed. This resulted in a series of raids and plundering, including the plundering of Shanxi in 1541–1543 and the vicinity of Beijing in the late 1540s. By 1550, the Mongols had even reached the walls of Beijing. In an attempt to calm the situation, the Emperor allowed the opening of border markets in the spring of 1551, but after only six months, he closed the markets again and the Mongols resumed their raids. The Eastern Mongols also joined in on the attacks, plundering Liaodong in the early 1550s. This continued for the next two decades, with the entire northern frontier constantly under threat. The Chinese, for their part, focused on defending the passes that led to the North China Plain and Beijing.

=== Military reforms in the early 1550s ===
Beijing after 1553

The failure of the Beijing garrison to defend against the Mongol invasion in 1550 prompted reforms, resulting in the abolition of 12 divisions and the western and eastern special detachments. These were replaced by the Three Great Camps, totaling 147,000 soldiers. These three corps were under the command of Qiu Luan, who held the title of Superintendent Commander-in-chief (縂督京營戎政; zongdu jingying rongzheng) and had gained recognition from the Emperor for his role in the battles against the Mongols. After Qiu Luan's death in 1552, the commander's powers were limited and the position was eventually abolished in 1570. The three corps then operated independently with their own headquarters. In 1552, the Emperor, recognizing the unreliability of the Beijing garrison, established the Palace Army (內武府; Neiwufu) made up of eunuchs. The following year, the southern suburbs of Beijing, known as the "Outer City", were fortified.

=== Sea ban policy and problems with pirates ===
Foreign maritime trade of the Ming dynasty was heavily restricted by the "sea ban" policy, which aimed to limit trade to tribute exchange and prohibited unlicensed private trading. The government, however, was unable to effectively enforce these restrictions, and illegal overseas trade became a significant part of the coastal economy. In the late 15th century, Southeast China, particularly the Jiangnan region along the lower Yangtze River, experienced a surge in population, the development of communication networks, commercialization, and the growth of critical thinking. As officials with a more favorable view towards trade began to join the government, debates emerged regarding the effectiveness and relevance of the existing anti-trade policy. During the reign of the Jiajing Emperor, the government became divided on the issue. Two factions, one advocating for the legalization of foreign trade to prevent costly wars and eliminate the root causes of conflict, and the other representing conservative landowners who believed in maintaining prohibitions and viewed war as inevitable for the sake of the country's security and stability, clashed over the authorization of foreign trade.

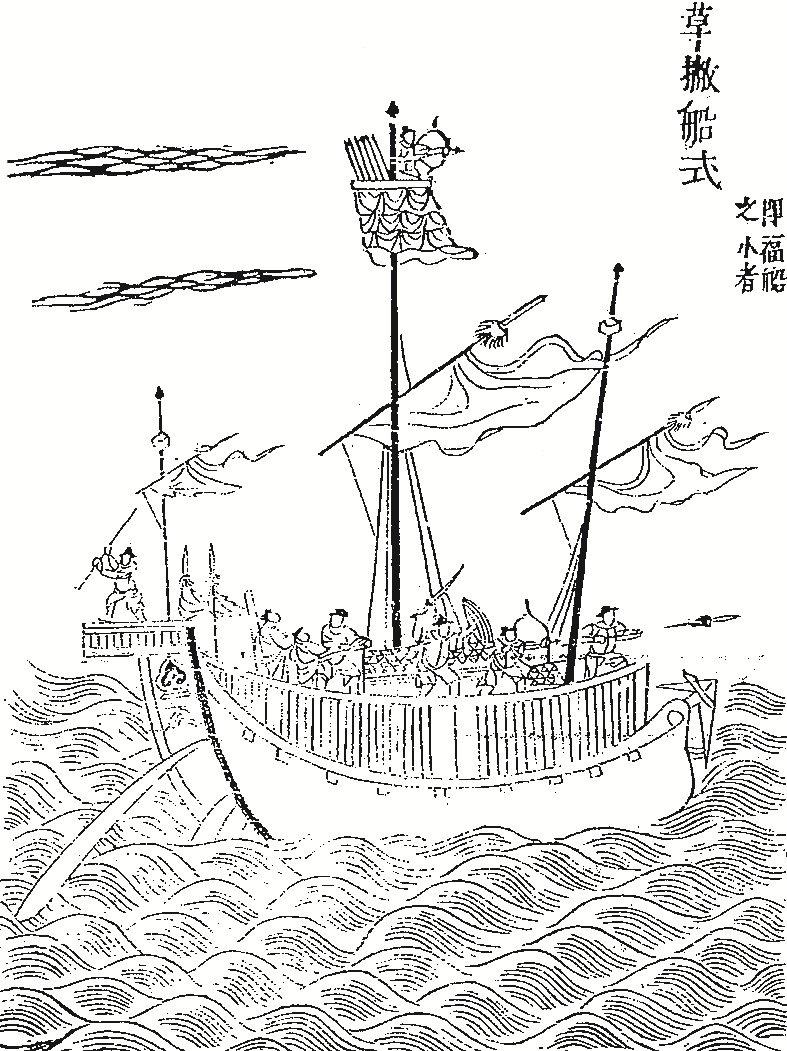
A Ming war junk, illustration from Illustrated book on maritime preparedness (籌海圖編, Chouhai tubian), Zheng Ruozeng, 1562

In the 1520s and 1530s, there was a rise in pirate attacks and related violence along the southeast coast from Zhejiang to Guangdong. The Jiajing government attempted to address this issue by implementing repeated bans on private maritime trade, even going as far as prohibiting the construction of ships with two or more masts. Despite the efforts of conservatives, maritime trade continued to grow significantly in the mid-16th century. During the 15th and 16th centuries, the Ming state gradually shifted to using silver as a form of taxation due to the lack of other options, but silver mining was limited and the state was unable to ensure its import through the tribute system. The highly profitable silver importation fell into the hands of smuggling groups.

The bans on private maritime trade were difficult to enforce, as the local military garrisons were ill-equipped to deal with the pirates. The soldiers lacked proper training and discipline, and the officers were often involved in illegal trade themselves. Furthermore, lax enforcement of the bans was supported by some high-ranking officials, including Grand Secretary Zhang Cong.

In the 1540s, groups of smugglers and pirates united and grew stronger, building bases on islands off the coast. From the mid-1520s, their center was the port of Shuangyu in the Zhoushan archipelago near Ningbo, where the Portuguese arrived in 1539 and the Japanese in 1545. In the late 1540s and 1550s, violence reached its peak as raids by pirates and smugglers not only affected the countryside, but also the suburbs of major cities such as Hangzhou and Jiaxing. In the latter half of the 1550s, Hu Zongxian, Yu Dayou, and Qi Jiguang managed to break up the smuggling groups and restore order in Zhejiang. By 1563, they had successfully cleared Fujian and by the mid-1560s, Guangdong and Guangxi. Piracy was no longer a serious problem. The Jiajing Emperor refused to lift the bans; it was only after his death in 1567 that a request to abolish the sea ban policy and allow "trade with both the western and eastern seas" was successful. Trade was then concentrated in Fujian's Moon Port (Yuegang), while trade with Japan remained strictly prohibited.

=== Portugal ===
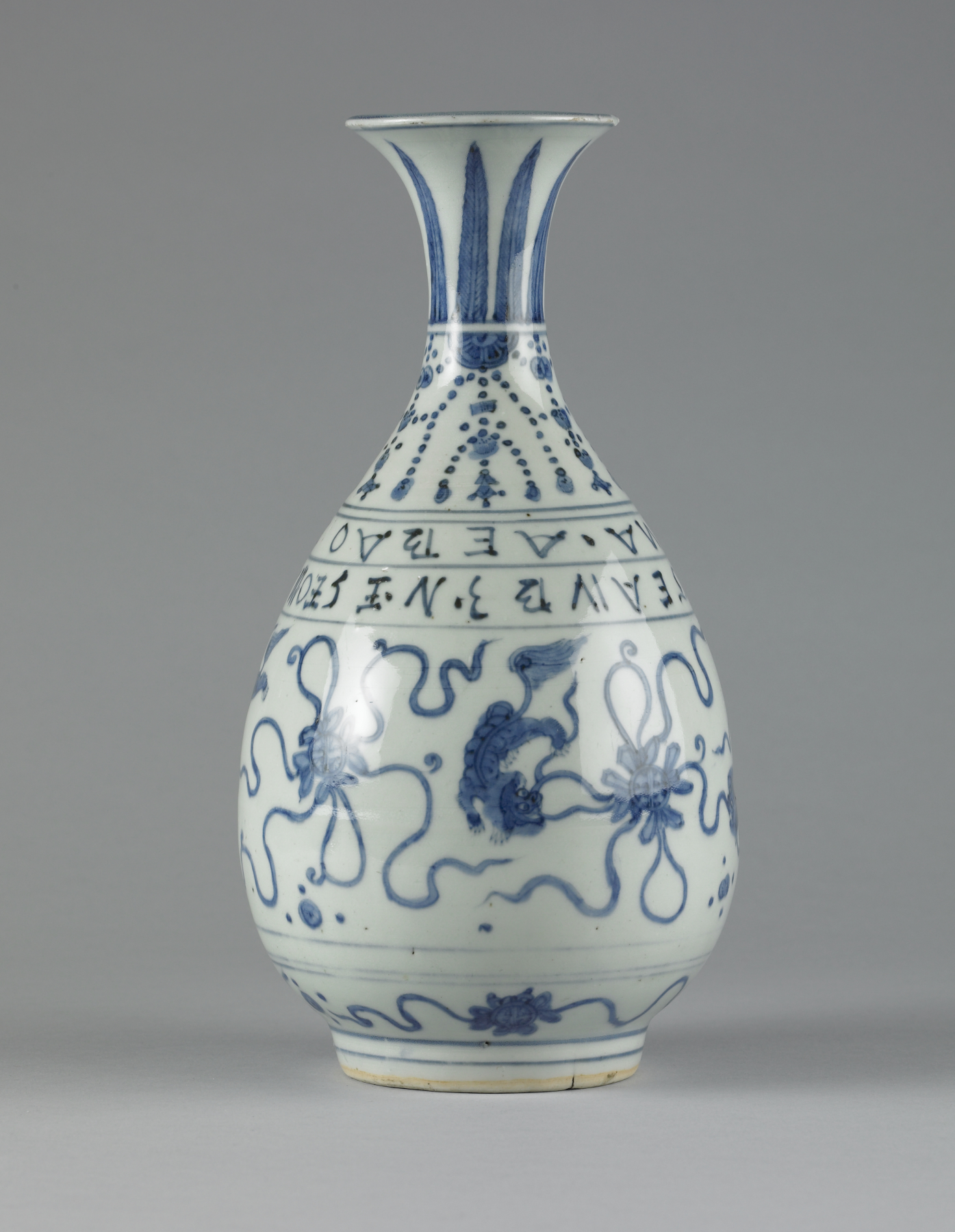
Chinese vase made in 1552 for Portuguese captain Jorge Anriques, with a Latin inscription imitation, Walters Art Museum, Baltimore

In 1513, the first Portuguese arrived in China. King Manuel I of Portugal attempted to establish official relations with Ming China, but the envoy Tomé Pires, who arrived with Fernão Pires de Andrade's squadron in 1517, was unsuccessful in gaining acceptance from the Zhengde Emperor. After the Zhengde Emperor's death in 1521, the new Jiajing government also refused to accept the Portuguese and sent Pires back to Guangzhou. In the same year, the Ming fleet defeated the Portuguese at the Battle of Tunmen. The conservative members of the government used the Portuguese occupation of Malacca, a former Chinese vassal, ten years prior as justification for rejecting the envoy. Upon returning to Guangzhou, Pires was accused by local authorities of being responsible for the violent behavior (including the kidnapping of children) of his comrades. He was arrested and died in prison in 1524.

In the 1530s and 1540s, the Portuguese were involved in illegal trade between China and Japan. It was not until the 1550s that relations between China and Portugal were normalized. Starting in 1549, the Chinese allowed Portuguese traders to visit Shangchuan Island in Guangdong annually. In 1557, the Portuguese were able to gain official permission, through bribery of local officials, to establish a trading colony in Macao. In the 1550s and 1560s, as Chinese merchants had limited access to Japan due to the fight against pirates along the coast, the Portuguese became the main intermediary for trade between Japan and China.

== Death and legacy ==
In the 1560s, the Emperor suffered from the effects of immortality potions, insomnia, and mood swings. He was often ill, failing to issue written orders after 11 November 1566 due to his poor health. On 23 January 1567, he moved from West Park to his residence in the Forbidden City, where he died around midday. He was buried in the Yong Mausoleum in the Ming tombs near Beijing. He was given the temple name Shizong and the (abbreviated) posthumous name Emperor Su.

The Jiajing Emperor was succeeded by his third son, Zhu Zaiji, who reigned as the Longqing Emperor. Although Zhu Zaiji was his father's eldest surviving son, he had never been named heir apparent and had little contact with the Emperor. He was ultimately designated as the Jiajing Emperor's successor in the latter's posthumous edict.

The Jiajing Emperor's reign was perceived positively in the immediate years following, with the Veritable Records describing him as a resolute and knowledgeable ruler who revitalized the land after the excesses of the Zhengde Emperor. He also brought order to ceremonies and successfully defended against barbarian threats from the north and the sea. The Veritable Records praised him for being active and energetic, strict with officials but sympathetic to the people, and devoted to his family, but he was known to prefer the company of sycophants who would not contradict him, and was vain and unwilling to admit his mistakes. He was also known for harsh and cruel punishments, as well as generous and swift rewards.

During the Jiajing era, the political system achieved a certain level of stability, but this stability was marred by tense relations between the government and the Emperor, which continued even during the reign of the Wanli Emperor (1572–1620). Like the Zhengde Emperor, the Jiajing Emperor attempted to assert his authority over the state bureaucracy, but ultimately failed. Conflicts with officials centered around the role of the Emperor, who was expected to act as an impartial judge in government discussions and carry out rituals in accordance with Neo-Confucian teachings, but the emperors saw this role as too restrictive and their attempts to assert their authority were unsuccessful. Driven by their own interests, officials were able to influence government policies despite the Emperor's wishes.

One example of the Emperor's failure was his handling of land registration for tax purposes. In the early 16th century, a significant amount of taxable land was not included in tax registers, and newly cultivated land was also left out. Liu Jin attempted to register hereditary soldiers in the first years of the 16th century, but was unsuccessful. Another attempt to register newly cultivated land at the beginning of the Jiajing era also failed. In 1512, 1531, and 1545, officials were able to expand tax exemptions, further hindering the collection of tax revenues. Additionally, the state failed to enforce the ban on maritime trade, resulting in lost tax revenues from illegal trade. Profits from improved agricultural practices, industrial development, crafts, and trade remained in the hands of private individuals, while the state received only a small portion of them. While the economy flourished, the state treasury did not.

== See also ==
- Chinese emperors family tree (late)

== Notes ==
Jiajing Emperor House of Zhu Born: 16 September 1507 Died: 23 January 1567
Regnal titles
Preceded by Zhengde Emperor	Emperor of the Ming dynasty 27 May 1521 – 23 January 1567	Succeeded by Longqing Emperor
Chinese royalty
Preceded by Zhu Youyuan	Prince of Xing; 15 April – 27 May 1521	Merged into the Crown
