= Zhu Zairui =

Crown Prince of China from 1539 to 1549

Zhu Zairui 朱載壡
- Crown Prince of the Ming dynasty
- Born: 20 October 1536
- Died: 14 April 1549 (aged 12)
Posthumous name
- Crown Prince Zhuangjing (Note: Simplified Chinese: 庄敬太子; traditional Chinese: 莊敬太子; pinyin: Zhuāngjìng tàizǐ)
- House: Zhu
- Father: Jiajing Emperor
- Mother: Lady Wang

Chinese name
- Traditional Chinese: 朱載壡
- Simplified Chinese: 朱载壡
Transcriptions
Standard Mandarin
- Hanyu Pinyin: Zhū Zǎiruì
- Wade–Giles: Chu^{1} Tsai^{4}-jui^{4}
- IPA: [ʈʂú tsâɪ.ɻwêɪ]

Zhu Zairui (20 October 1536 – 14 April 1549) was a prince of the Ming dynasty of China. He was the second son of the Jiajing Emperor. He was designated heir apparent in 1539, at the age of three. Despite suffering from poor health, Zhu Zairui received an education from prominent scholars of his time and began representing the Emperor at official ceremonies while still young. His death in 1549 deeply affected the Jiajing Emperor and became a factor in later succession considerations, including the Emperor's preference among his younger sons as possible heirs.

== Biography ==
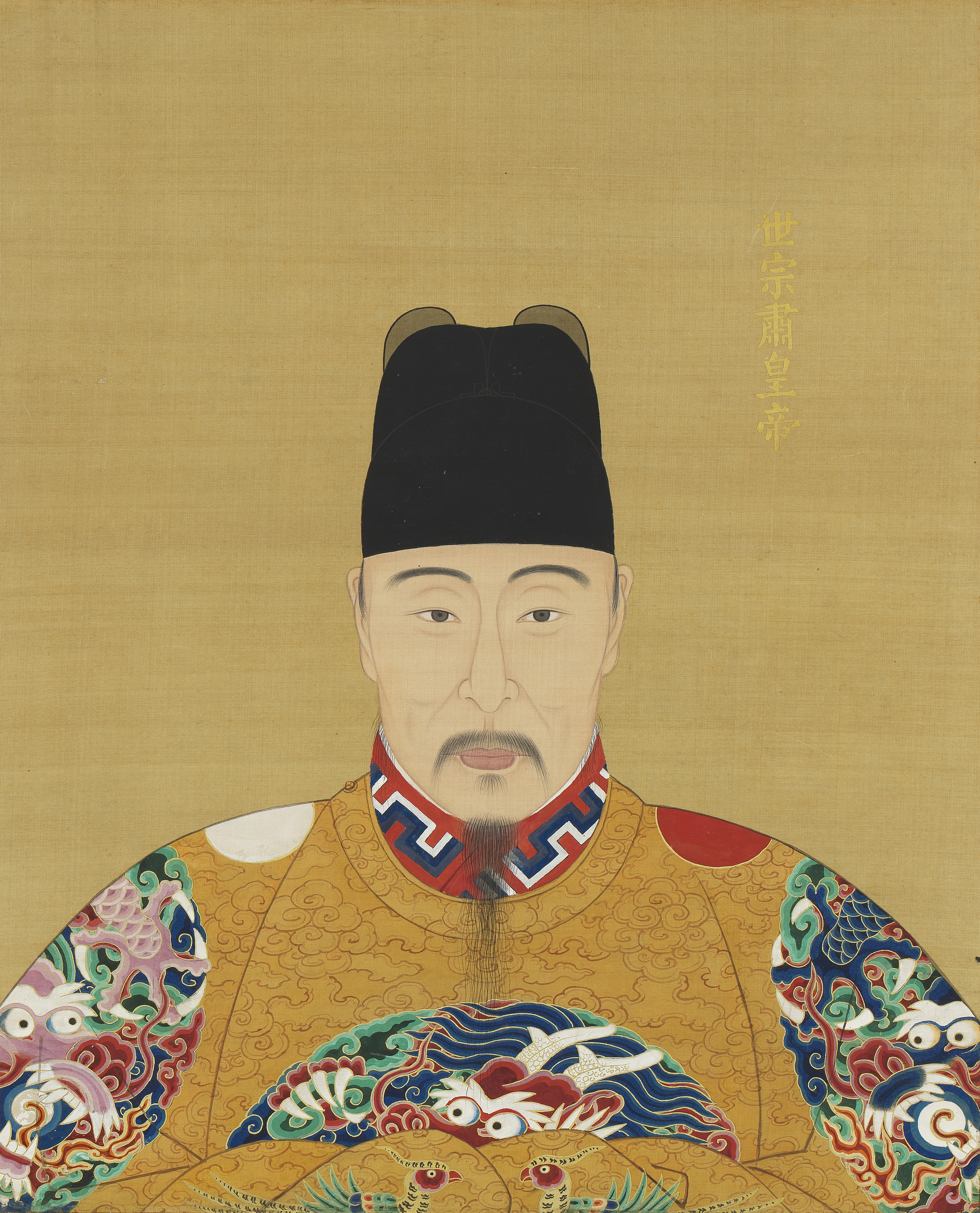
The Jiajing Emperor, Zhu Zairui's father

A page from the 1548 edition of the Huangming zhaoling (皇明詔令) containing the 1539 Edict on the Investiture of the Heir Apparent and the Enfeoffment of Two Princes (立皇太子並封二王詔), which designated Zhu Zairui as heir to the throne.

Zhu Zairui was born on 20 October 1536 as the second son of the Jiajing Emperor, the 12th emperor of China's Ming dynasty. His mother, surnamed Wang, was one of the Emperor's concubines and held the title of Guifei (Noble Consort). The Jiajing Emperor's eldest son died just two months after his birth in 1533, making Zhu Zairui the Emperor's eldest surviving son.

In the spring of 1539, the Emperor embarked on a journey from Beijing to his birthplace in central China. Before his departure, he officially appointed Zhu Zairui as heir to the throne. On the same occasion, Zhu Zairui's younger brothers, Zhu Zaiji and Zhu Zaizhen, were granted the titles Prince of Yu and Prince of Jing, respectively. In 1540, Zhu Zairui contracted smallpox, a highly dangerous disease at the time, and developed widespread pustules. Historical accounts attributed his recovery to the prayers of the Taoist priest Tao Zhongwen and the medical treatments he provided. Zhu Zairui was often ill and physically weak, and his education did not begin until 1546. The Emperor selected scholars Lu Shen (陸深; 1477–1544), Cui Xian (崔銑; 1478–1571), Luo Hongxian (1504–1564), Tang Shunzhi (唐順之; 1507–1560), and Huangfu Xiao (皇甫涍; 1497–1546) to educate Zhu Zairui. The public regarded them as the best scholars of their generation, only surpassed by Song Lian (1310–1381), who contributed to the founding of the dynasty.

In 1545, after the Imperial Ancestral Temple had been repaired and partially rebuilt, the Emperor instructed Zhu Zairui to perform the inaugural ceremony on his behalf, which he did very well. Impressed by his son's perspicacity and driven by his strong interest in Confucian and Taoist rituals, the Emperor ordered the heir apparent to undergo the traditional "capping" ceremony in 1549, six years earlier than the customary age of adulthood. Zhu Zairui caught a cold during the ceremony, and died two days later on 14 April 1549. The official history of the Jiajing Emperor's reign, known as the Shizong Shilu ('Veritable Records of Emperor Shizong'), records that before his death, Zhu Zairui faced north, bowed twice to his father, and said, "I am leaving now" (兒去矣). He then sat cross-legged in an upright posture and died. He was given the posthumous name Crown Prince Zhuangjing and was buried at Tianshou Mountain.

Zhu Zairui's death brought the Jiajing Emperor immense sorrow and regret, as he believed he had not listened to the supposed advice of Tao Zhongwen, who had warned him that "two dragons should not face each other". The "two dragons" referred to the reigning emperor and the heir apparent. This belief appealed to the Emperor, who suffered from chronic health problems and was reluctant to confront reminders of his own mortality. It also aligned with his personal affection for his youngest son, Zhu Zaizhen, whom he occasionally favored over his third son, Zhu Zaiji, as a potential heir. During the succession debates of the 1550s, Zhu Zaizhen emerged as a potential successor, but in 1560 the Emperor sent him to his fief in De'an, Huguang. Zhu Zaiji then became the de facto heir apparent and eventually succeeded to the throne as the Longqing Emperor.

== Notes ==
Zhu Zairui House of Zhu Born: 20 October 1536 Died: 14 April 1549
Chinese royalty
Vacant Title last held by Zhu Houzhao	Crown Prince of the Ming dynasty 1539–1549	Vacant Title next held by Zhu Yijun
