= Zhu Zaizhen =

Chinese prince (1537–1565)

Zhu Zaizhen 朱載圳
- Prince of Jing
- Born: 1537
- Died: 9 February 1565 (aged 27–28)
- Burial: Western Hills, Beijing
Posthumous name
- Prince Gong of Jing (Note: Chinese: 景恭王; pinyin: Jǐng Gōngwáng)
- House: Zhu
- Father: Jiajing Emperor
- Mother: Lady Lu

Chinese name
- Traditional Chinese: 朱載圳
- Simplified Chinese: 朱载圳
Transcriptions
Standard Mandarin
- Hanyu Pinyin: Zhū Zàizhèn
- Wade–Giles: Chu^{1} Tsai^{4}-chên^{4}
- IPA: [ʈʂú tsâɪ.ʈʂə̂n]

Zhu Zaizhen (1537 – 9 February 1565) was a prince of the Ming dynasty of China. He was the fourth son of the Jiajing Emperor. In 1539, his father granted him the title of Prince of Jing. The Emperor favored Zhu Zaizhen's mother, Lady Lu, and Zhu Zaizhen was therefore seen as a potential successor instead of his elder brother Zhu Zaiji. However, he was eventually sent to his fief at De'an in Huguang, leaving Zhu Zaiji as the sole remaining heir. While in his fief, Zhu Zaizhen gained a reputation for his arrogance and abuse of power, as he forcibly expanded his estates and clashed with local officials. He died in 1565 without any heirs, resulting in the abolition of his princedom.

== Biography ==
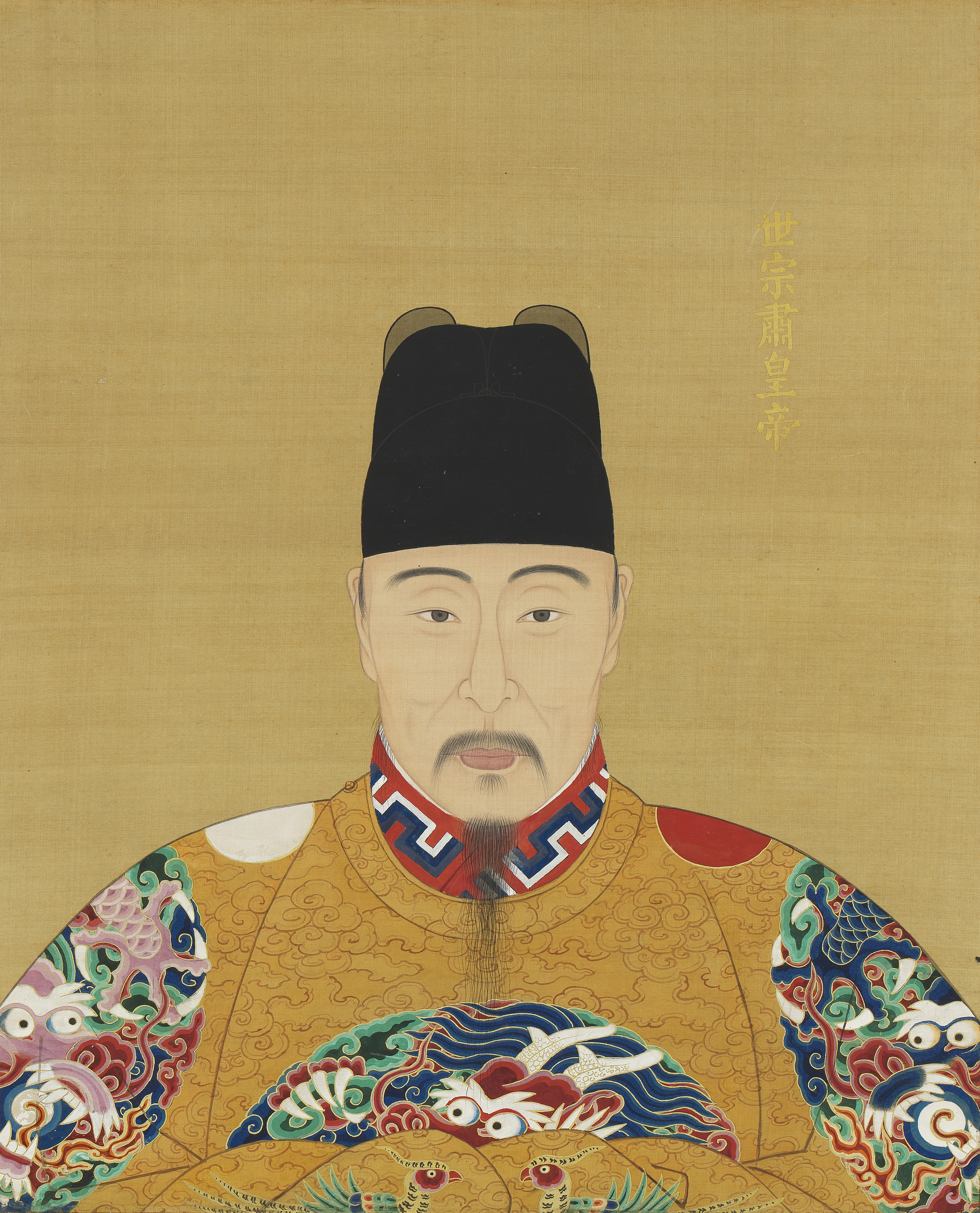
The Jiajing Emperor, Zhu Zaizhen's father

Zhu Zaizhen was born in 1537 to the Jiajing Emperor, the 12th emperor of China's Ming dynasty, and a concubine surnamed Lu. He was the Emperor's fourth son; the eldest son had died in infancy before Zhu Zaizhen's birth. Zhu Zaizhen was seven months younger than the Emperor's second son, Zhu Zairui, and one month younger than the third son, Zhu Zaiji.

In February 1539, the Jiajing Emperor named Zhu Zairui heir to the throne. On the same day, he granted Zhu Zaiji the title of Prince of Yu and Zhu Zaizhen the title of Prince of Jing (景王). In 1549, Zhu Zairui died. His death caused the Jiajing Emperor to feel immense sorrow and regret, as he believed he had not listened to the supposed advice of his Taoist priest Tao Zhongwen, who had warned him that "two dragons should not face each other". Since the dragon symbolized the emperor, this belief may have contributed to his reluctance to designate another heir. In September 1552, Zhu Zaiji and Zhu Zaizhen began their education together. Two months later, wives were selected for them, and they were married in February 1553. The Jiajing Emperor ensured that he and the officials treated the third and fourth sons equally, sparking speculation at court as to who would become his successor. The Emperor spent much of his time in the company of Lady Lu, further suggesting he preferred her son as his heir. In contrast, when Zhu Zaiji's mother died in February 1554, the funeral arrangements had to be revised twice, as the Emperor suppressed any suggestion that she held a higher status than just the mother of the presumptive heir.

According to customary practice, ordinary men underwent the capping ceremony at twenty, while imperial princes usually did so earlier, between the ages of twelve and fifteen. Afterward, they were considered adults and expected to reside outside the palace. The Jiajing Emperor proposed holding Zhu Zaiji's capping ceremony in 1545, when he was only nine years old. In contrast, he delayed Zhu Zaizhen's ceremony and did not allow him to leave the palace even after he had turned twenty. In March 1560, the Jiajing Emperor received a memorandum suggesting that Zhu Zaiji be appointed as his successor. The Emperor was outraged and ordered the execution of the writer, but later that year, he changed his mind and ordered Zhu Zaizhen to take up residence in De'an Prefecture. This decision effectively left Zhu Zaiji as the sole candidate for the succession, although he remained out of the Emperor's favor. De'an's seat was Anlu in Huguang (present-day Hubei Province), the former fief of the Jiajing Emperor's father, Zhu Youyuan, and the place where the Emperor had lived before his accession. Zhu Zaizhen, however, remained dissatisfied. After arriving at his fief, he behaved arrogantly and tyrannically, forcibly annexing land to his domain. In 1561, Zhu Zaizhen sought to incorporate Shashi in Jingzhou into his estate, even though it lay outside his jurisdiction. Prefect Xu Xuemo (徐學謨) thwarted his plan. Irritated by the rebuff, Zhu Zaizhen lodged complaints against Xu, which led to the latter's dismissal from office in 1563. (Note: Xu Xuemo was later reinstated during the Longqing Emperor's reign.) Zhu Zaizhen also sought to appropriate the estates of the Liu family of Hanyang, a move opposed by Prefectural Judge Wu Zongzhou (吳宗周). Like Xu, Wu was removed from office. According to one estimate, the amount of land unlawfully occupied by Zhu Zaizhen exceeded tens of thousands of hectares.

On 9 February 1565, Zhu Zaizhen died of illness. Upon receiving this news, the Jiajing Emperor said to Grand Secretary Xu Jie, "This son had long sought to supplant the heir apparent; now he is dead". Zhu Zaizhen had no children and was buried in the Western Hills of Beijing. As per the Emperor's orders, all of his concubines were required to return to the capital and reside in the prince's former residence. Additionally, his princedom was abolished. Two years later, in 1567, his brother Zhu Zaiji succeeded their father as the Longqing Emperor.

== Notes ==
Zhu Zaizhen House of Zhu Born: 1537 Died: 9 February 1565
Chinese royalty
New creation	Prince of Jing; 1539–1565	Title abolished
