= Wang Shenzhong =

Chinese writer (1509–1559)

- 王慎中
- Born: 1509; Jinjiang, Fujian
- Died: 1559 (aged 49–50)
- Education: jinshi degree (1526)

Chinese name
- Chinese: 王慎中
Transcriptions
Standard Mandarin
- Hanyu Pinyin: Wáng Shènzhōng

Wang Shenzhong (Note: Wang Shenzhong used the courtesy name Daosi (道思) and the art names Nanjiang (南江), Zhonglu Shanren (中麓山人), and Zunyan Jushi (遵岩居士). He was the second son, and therefore he was called Wang Zhongzi (王仲子; 'Middle son of Wang').) (1509–1559) was a Chinese prose writer during the Ming dynasty and one of the Eight Talents of the Jiajing era.

== Biography ==
Wang Shenzhong was born in Jinjiang County, located in the southeastern region of Ming China in Fujian Province. From a young age, he dedicated himself to studying the Confucian classics and eventually took the civil service examinations. He successfully passed the lower levels and in 1526, he achieved the jinshi degree, allowing him to enter official service. Throughout his career, he steadily climbed the ranks and eventually became administration vice commissioner of Henan (參政, canzheng). In 1541, he was dismissed from his position.

He was a prominent cultural figure during the Ming dynasty, and was considered one of the Eight Talents of the Jiajing era. The Eight Talents were influenced by authors from the Tang and Song periods and were in contrast to the dominant literary style of the time, represented by the Earlier Seven Masters of the Ming. The Seven Masters valued prose writers from the Han dynasty and earlier, as well as poets from the Tang dynasty and earlier.

At first, like many of his contemporaries, he looked to the Seven Masters as models for literary creation. Later on, however, he turned away from them and became interested in the works of Song dynasty writers Ouyang Xiu and Zeng Gong. As a literary theorist, he believed that while learning from the masters is valuable, ultimately an author must write in their own words, directly from the heart. Although he also wrote poetry, his contemporaries particularly valued his prose works. Some of his most significant works include Haishang pingkou ji (海上平寇記), Song Cheng Longfeng junbo zhishi xu (送程龍峰郡博致仕序), Jinxi youji (金溪遊記), You Qingyuanshan ji (游清源山記), and Zhu Bitan shi xu (朱碧潭詩序).
