= 1510 =

1510 in various calendars
- Gregorian calendar: 1510; MDX
- Ab urbe condita: 2263
- Armenian calendar: 959; ԹՎ ՋԾԹ
- Assyrian calendar: 6260
- Balinese saka calendar: 1431–1432
- Bengali calendar: 916–917
- Berber calendar: 2460
- English Regnal year: 1 Hen. 8 – 2 Hen. 8
- Buddhist calendar: 2054
- Burmese calendar: 872
- Byzantine calendar: 7018–7019
- Chinese calendar: 己巳年 (Earth Snake); 4207 or 4000 — to — 庚午年 (Metal Horse); 4208 or 4001
- Coptic calendar: 1226–1227
- Discordian calendar: 2676
- Ethiopian calendar: 1502–1503
- Hebrew calendar: 5270–5271
- Hindu calendars
- Vikram Samvat: 1566–1567
- Shaka Samvat: 1431–1432
- Kali Yuga: 4610–4611
- Holocene calendar: 11510
- Igbo calendar: 510–511
- Iranian calendar: 888–889
- Islamic calendar: 915–916
- Japanese calendar: Eishō 7 (永正７年)
- Javanese calendar: 1427–1428
- Julian calendar: 1510; MDX
- Korean calendar: 3843
- Minguo calendar: 402 before ROC 民前402年
- Nanakshahi calendar: 42
- Thai solar calendar: 2052–2053
- Tibetan calendar: ས་མོ་སྦྲུལ་ལོ་ (female Earth-Snake); 1636 or 1255 or 483 — to — ལྕགས་ཕོ་རྟ་ལོ་ (male Iron-Horse); 1637 or 1256 or 484

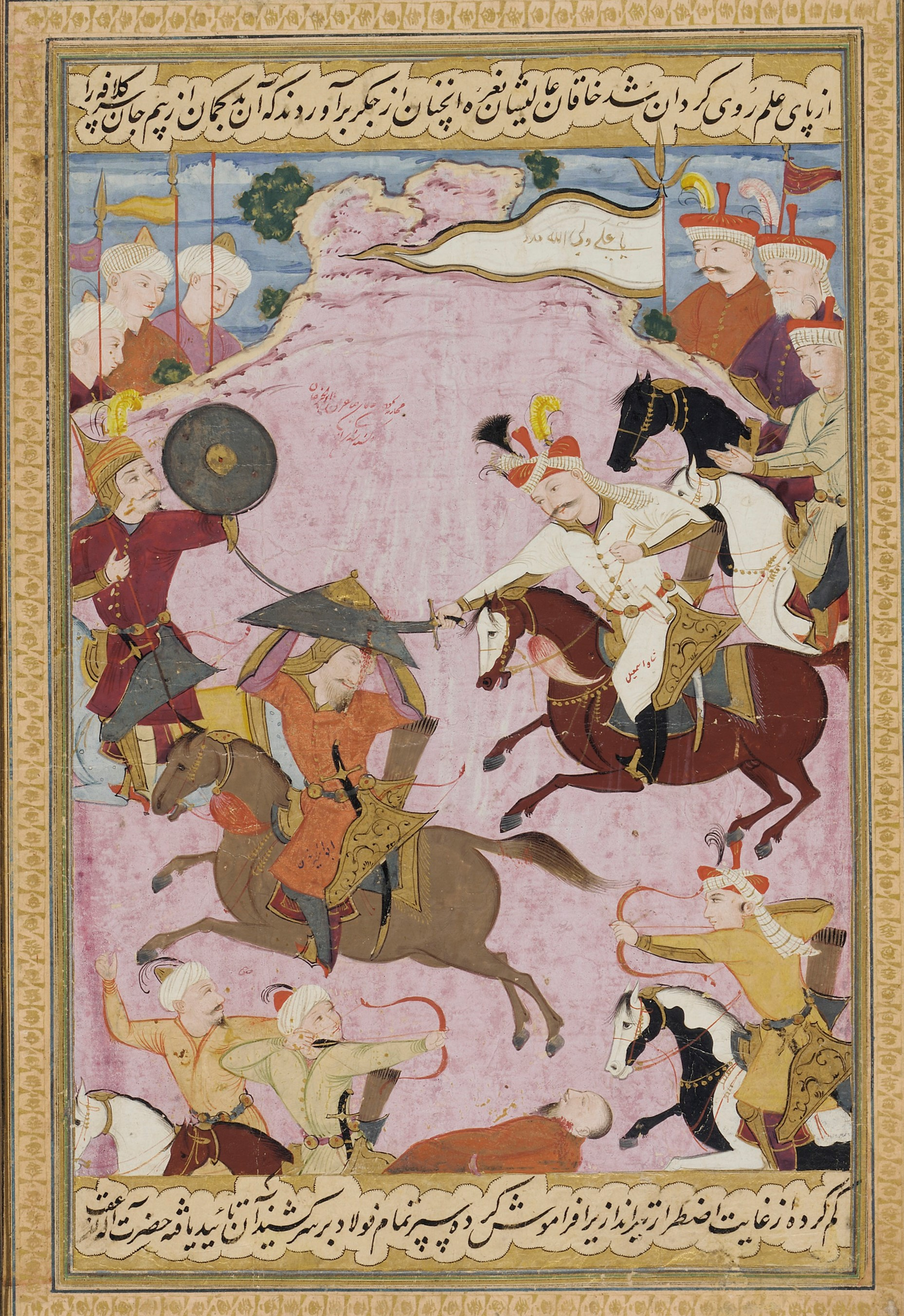
December 2: Shah Ismail I defeats Muhammad Shaybani at Battle of Merv.

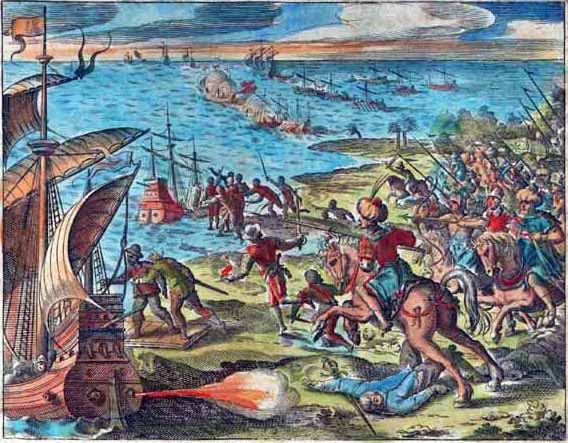
Portuguese Armada retreat after monsoon conditions and a counterattack by the forces of Yusuf Adil Shah.

Year 1510 (MDX) was a common year starting on Tuesday of the Julian calendar.

== Events ==
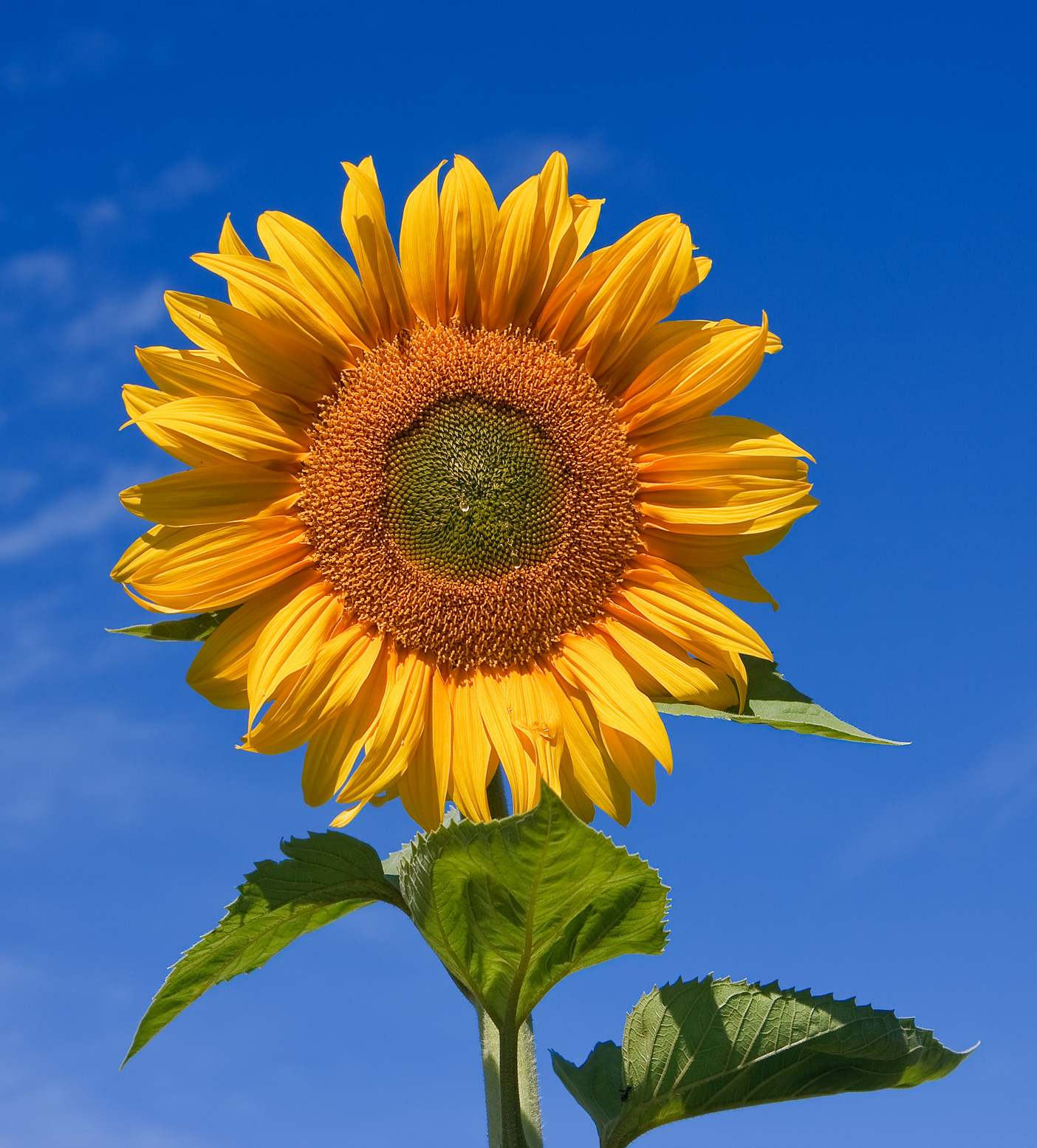
Sunflowers are introduced in Europe.

=== January–March ===
- January 23 – An 18-year-old Henry VIII jousts anonymously at Richmond, Surrey and draws applause, before revealing his identity.
- January 29 – The Mary Rose ship is laid out. The next year the ship is launched on July 29, 1511, and is afterwards towed to London to be fitted, and is finally completed in 1512. In 1545, during the Battle of the Solent, she sank. The reason for her sinking is disputed with contemporary accounts claiming the ship was heeled over or sank by French ships with gunfire, although modern historians believe it was sunk due to being unstable.
- January 31 – Catherine of Aragon gives birth to her first child, and the first known child of King Henry VIII, a stillborn daughter.
- February 15 – Peace treaty concluded between Pope Julius II and the Republic of Venice.
- February 24 – In Rome, Pope Julius II revokes the interdict, imposed on the Republic of Venice in 1509.
- February 27– Portuguese conquest of Goa: Afonso de Albuquerque of Portugal begins a nine month battle to conquer Goa off the coast of India.
- March 1 – Battle of Salt River: Indigenous ǃUriǁʼaekua decisively defeat sailors of the Portuguese Empire in South Africa.
- March 12 – Mihnea cel Rău, the ruling Prince of Wallachia (now in Romania), is assassinated in Sibiu while attending Mass at the Roman Catholic church there.

=== April–June ===
- April 4 – The "Disturbance of the Three Ports", an uprising by Japanese merchants against the Korean government, begins in what is now South Korea in the cities of Dongnae, Changwon and Ulsan.
- April 13 – Park Won-jong resigns as Chief State Councillor of the Korean Empire and is succeeded by Kim Su-dong.
- April 19 – The simultaneous Japanese uprising in Korea is suppressed by the Korean Emperor Jungjong, and all trade between Korea and Japan is halted for the next two years.
- April 27 – (4th waning of Kason 872 ME In what is now Myanmar, Min Raza, King of Burma as ruler of the Kingdom of Arakan, leaves the capital city of Mrauk-U permanently and relocates to the old capital at Waithali, where he shows little interest in governing his kingdom.
- May 12 – The Prince of Anhua rebellion begins when Zhu Zhifan, Prince of Anhua, kills all the officials invited to a banquet, and declares his intent on ousting the powerful Ming dynasty eunuch Liu Jin, during the reign of the Zhengde Emperor in China.
- May 30 – Rebel leader Zhu Zhifan is defeated and captured by commander Qiu Yue, ending the Prince of Anhua rebellion.
- June 5 – The Sultan Abu Abdallah V of Tlemcen (now part of Algeria) agrees to pay a demand for tribute to the Ferdinand II, King of Aragon (now part of Spain), prompting Ferdinand to plot an invasion of the neighboring kingdom Ifriqiya and its capital, Tripoli.

=== July–September ===
- July 25 – Spanish troops capture Tripoli at the direction of King Ferdinand II of Aragon and under the command of Pedro Navarro.
- July – The Holy League, formed to defend the Italian States, attacks French-occupied Genoa. The 1510 influenza pandemic reaches Sicily, where it is nicknamed coccolucio, before spreading to the Italian states and the rest of Europe.
- August 10 – The Royal Dano-Norwegian Navy is founded when Henrich Krummedige is appointed chief captain of all those who are at sea.
- September 3 – Sir Thomas More becomes undersheriff of the City of London.
- September 10 – (Eishō 7, 18th day of the 8th month) An estimated 6.7 magnitude earthquake in the Seto Inland Sea (Setonaikai) strikes off the coast of Japan near what is now Nanko-Higashi.

=== October–December ===
- October 10 – (Eishō 7, 8th day of the 9th month) An earthquake in the Enshunada Sea off of the coast of Hamamatsu in what is now the Shizuoka Prefecture in Japan produces a devastating tsunami.
- October 16 – Mingyi Nyo declares independence from the Ava Kingdom in upper Burma, by establishing the Toungoo dynasty.
- November 25 – Afonso de Albuquerque succeeds in conquering Goa and establishes the colony of Portuguese India.
- December 2 – Battle of Merv: Shah Ismail I's defeats the Uzbek forces of Shaybani Khan, in Khorasan. Shaybani flees the battle only to be captured and killed by Ismail I troops, his head is turned into a skull cup used as a drinking goblet.

=== Date unknown ===
- The Grand Prince of Moscow Vasili III conquers Pskov.
- Paolo Cortesi publishes De Cardinalatu, a manual for cardinals, including advice on palatial architecture – which inspires Thomas Wolsey in his construction work at Hampton Court Palace.
- Sunflowers are brought to Europe by Spaniards.

== Births ==
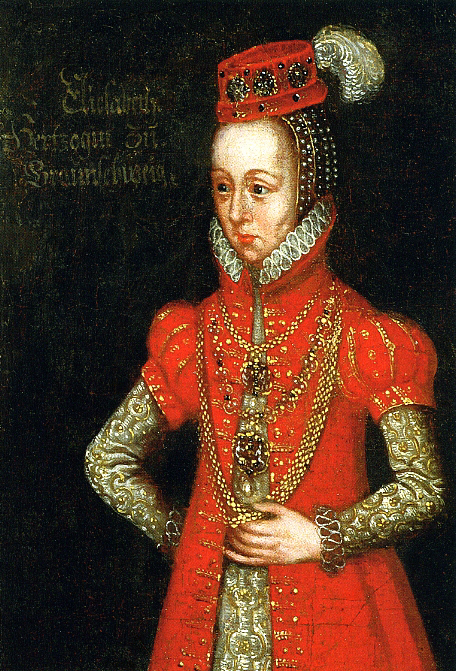
Elisabeth of Brandenburg

- February 24 – Costanzo II Sforza, Italian noble (d. 1512)
- March 25 – Guillaume Postel, French linguist (d. 1581)
- March 30 – Antonio de Cabezón, Spanish composer and organist (d. 1566)
- June 6 – Giovanni Battista Cicala, Italian Catholic cardinal (d. 1570)
- August 11 – Margaret Paleologa, Sovereign Marchioness of Montferrat (1531–1540) (d. 1566)
- August 24 – Elisabeth of Brandenburg, Duchess of Brunswick-Calenberg-Göttingen (1525–1540) (d. 1558)
- October 6
  - Rowland Taylor, English Protestant martyr (d. 1555)
  - John Caius, English physician (d. 1573)
- October 25 – Renée of France, French princess (d. 1574)
- October 28 – Francis Borgia, Spanish General of the Jesuits (d. 1572)
- December 28 – Nicholas Bacon, English politician (d. 1579)
- date unknown
  - Jörg Breu the Younger, German painter (d. 1547)
  - Ferenc Dávid, Hungarian founder of the Unitarian Church (d. 1579)
  - Solomon Luria, Polish-born Kabbalist (d. 1574)
  - Oda Nobuhide, Japanese warlord (d. 1551)
  - Bernard Palissy, French potter and writer
  - Elizabeth Lucar, English calligrapher (d. 1537)
  - Ambroise Paré, French surgeon (d. 1590)
  - Nicolas Durand de Villegaignon, French naval officer (d. 1571)
  - Pierre de Manchicourt, Flemish composer (d. 1564)
  - Gracia Mendes Nasi, Portuguese businessperson and philanthropist (d. 1569)
  - Francisco Vázquez de Coronado, Spanish conquistador (d. 1554)
- probable
  - Tullia d'Aragona, Italian poet, author and philosopher (d. 1556)
  - Aloysius Lilius, Italian inventor of the Gregorian calendar (d. 1576)
  - Luis de Morales, Spanish religious painter (d. 1586)
  - Lope de Rueda, Spanish dramatist and author (d. 1565)
  - Claudio Veggio, Italian composer

== Deaths ==
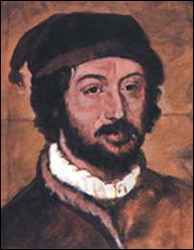
Juan de la Cosa

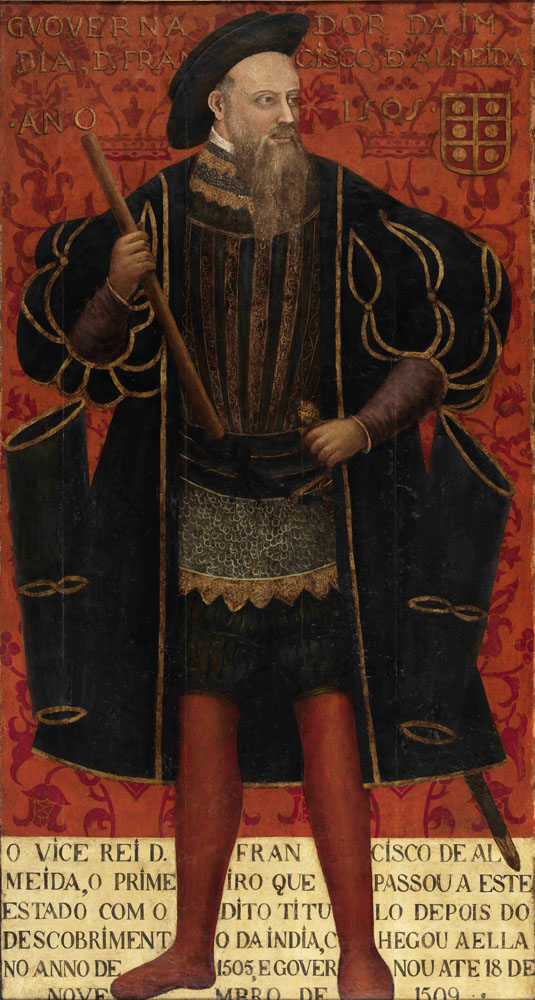
Francisco de Almeida

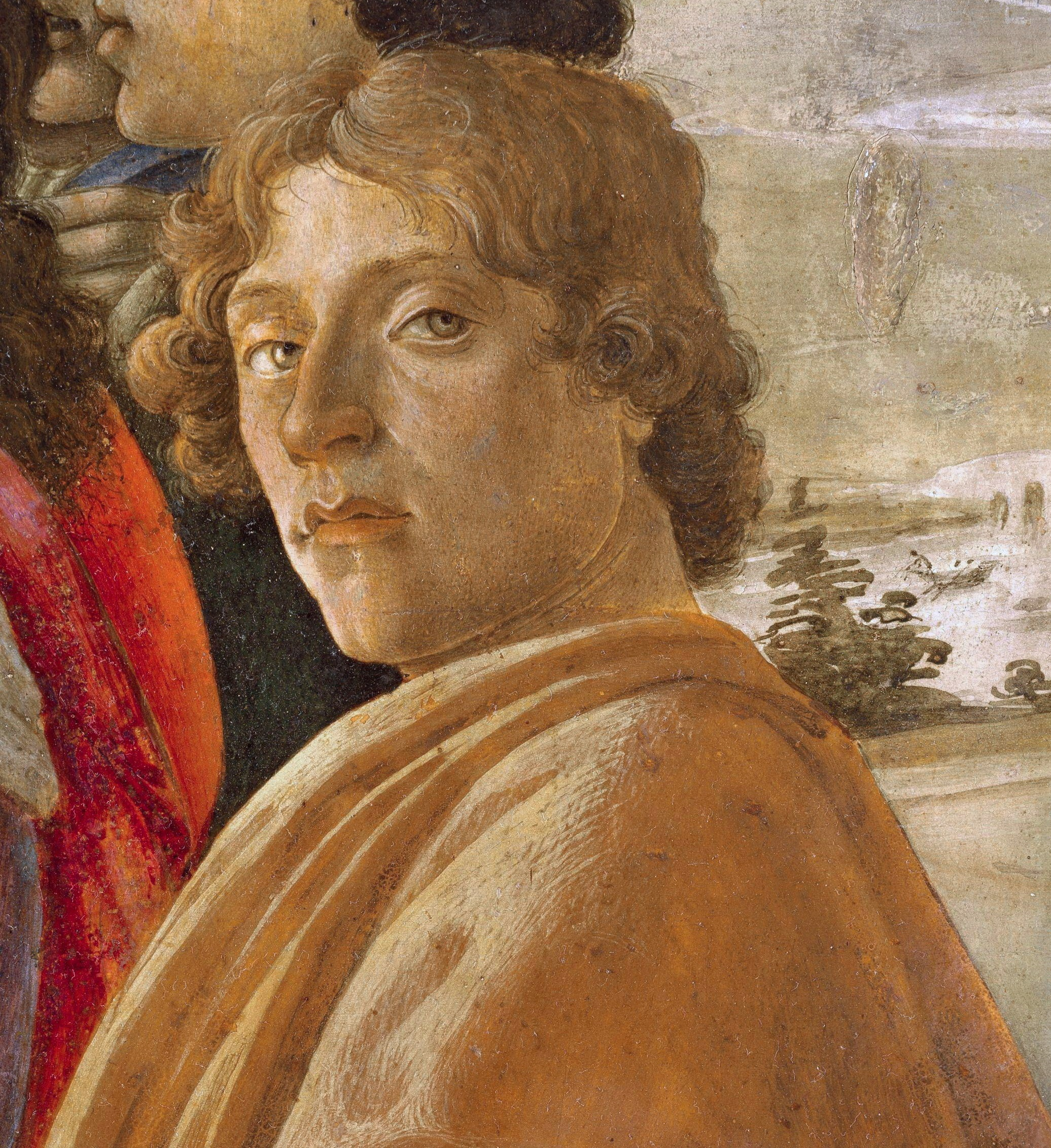
Sandro Botticelli

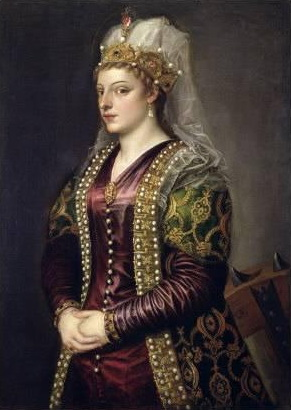
Catherine Cornaro

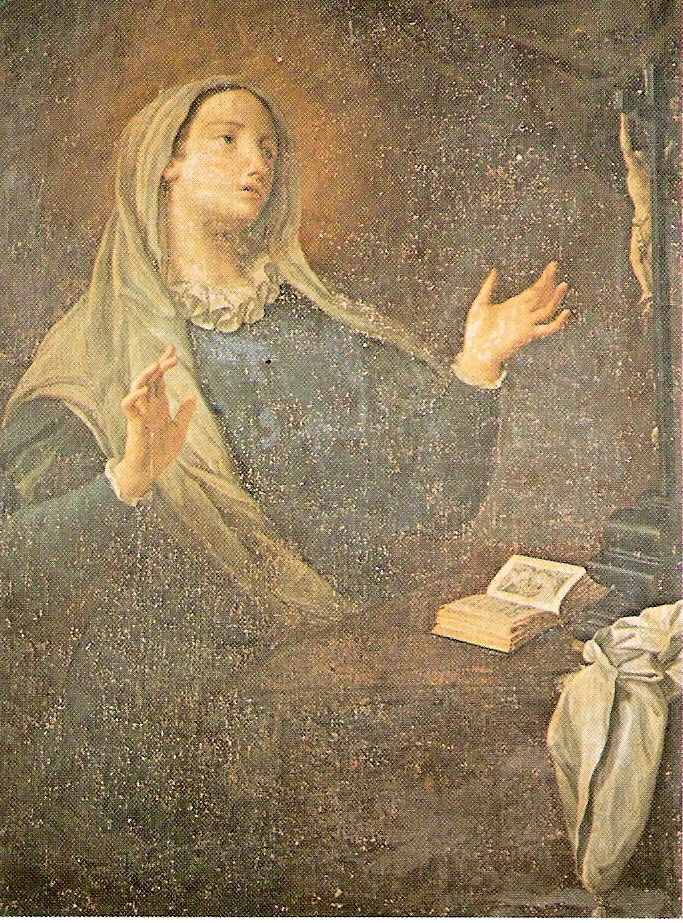
Saint Catherine of Genoa

- February 1 – Sidonie of Poděbrady, Bohemian princess, duchess consort of Saxony (b. 1449)
- February 28 – Juan de la Cosa, Spanish cartographer and explorer (b. c. 1460)
- March 1 – Francisco de Almeida, Portuguese soldier and explorer (b. c. 1450)
- March 10 – Johann Geiler von Kaisersberg, German preacher (b. 1445)
- May 17 – Sandro Botticelli, Italian painter (b. 1445)
- May 25 – Cardinal Georges d'Ambroise, aka Monseigneur le Ledat. Adviser to King Louis XII (b. 1460)
- July 10 – Catherine Cornaro, Queen of Cyprus (b. 1454)
- July 14 – Arthur Stewart, Duke of Rothesay, heir to the Scottish throne (b. 1509)
- July 27 – Giovanni Sforza, Italian condottiere (b. 1466)
- August 17
  - Edmund Dudley, English statesman (b. c. 1462)
  - Richard Empson, English statesman
- September 15 – Saint Catherine of Genoa (b. 1447)
- September 17 – Giorgione, Italian painter (b. c. 1477)
- September 18 – Ursula of Brandenburg, Duchess of Mecklenburg-Schwerin (b. 1488)
- November 11 – Bohuslav Hasištejnský z Lobkovic, Bohemian writer (b. 1461)
- December 2 – Muhammad Shaybani, Khan of Bukhara (b. 1451)
- December 14 – Friedrich of Saxony (b. 1473)
- December 31 – Bianca Maria Sforza, Holy Roman Empress (b. 1472)
- date unknown
  - Agüeybaná, Taino chief
  - Giovanna d'Aragona, Duchess of Amalfi, Italian regent (b. 1478)
  - Mandukhai Khatun, Mongolian queen
