= Eight Tigers =

Group of eunuchs who controlled the Zhengde Emperor (1505-21) of Ming-dynasty China

The Eight Tigers (Chinese: 八虎; pinyin: Bā Hǔ), sometimes referred to as the Gang of Eight (八黨), were a powerful group of eunuchs that controlled the Chinese imperial court during the reign of the Zhengde Emperor (r. 1505–1521) of the Ming dynasty.

Led by Liu Jin, the remaining members of the coterie were Ma Yongcheng (馬永成), Gao Feng (高鳳), Luo Xiang (羅祥), Wei Bin (魏彬), Qiu Ju (丘聚), Gu Dayong (谷大用), and Zhang Yong (張永).

== Background ==
=== Eunuchs in China ===
Eunuchs are castrated men who have often been used as servants or political functionaries in imperial and noble households, due to the understanding that they would not be distracted by, or be a danger to, women, and that they would not have offspring that they might be tempted to prioritise over their lords. Eunuchs were often utilized in the imperial household as harem guards and attendants. The harems were considered necessary in order to help produce a male heir, and the eunuchs were trusted protectors.

Before the Ming Dynasty, eunuchs had long been a powerful political force in China. In the Tang dynasty, from 821 until the dynasty's end, eunuchs were "the real power holders". They controlled the Imperial Guard and the Palace Secretariat, chose seven out of eight emperors, and possibly killed two emperors.

The first Ming emperor, Hongwu (1328-1398), was worried about the power of the eunuchs. He erected a tablet that said, "Eunuchs must have nothing to do with administration", and he worked to disempower them. He warned, "Anyone using eunuchs as his eyes and ears will be blind and deaf". Despite these measures, many of emperors who followed Hongwu were more willing to leave ruling to the eunuchs, and the Ming Dynasty became the peak of eunuch influence. By the end of the 15th century, there were 10,000 eunuchs working in the palace.

In addition to close access to the emperor and his wives and concubines, they were often trusted with imperial sons. Oftentimes, this trust extended to eunuchs being given command as palace guards, military commanders, or imperial inspectors. They controlled the court's luxury workshops and managed the tributes from the provinces and foreign countries, and they were often made the heads of official missions abroad. This power gave the eunuchs many chances to become rich through graft. They also eventually controlled the secret police, which meant they could control the nation through blackmail and corruption.

=== The rise to power of the Eight Tigers ===
Emperor Zhengde ascended to the imperial throne in 1505, aged 14, after the death of his father.

From the early days of his rule, it was clear that the young emperor distrusted government officials and was partial to eunuchs who took an active role in raising him. The emperor's inner circle consisted of 8 eunuchs who served him when he was still heir apparent and became his personal staff shortly after Zhengde began his reign. Shortly after the emperor's ascension to the throne, the Eight Tigers swiftly took control of important positions not only in the imperial court but also in the secret service and the army. In addition to this, they appointed their relatives to influential ranks and roles in the dynasty.

One of the eunuchs, Liu Jin, who would emerge as the leader of the group, was put in charge of palace music in early 1506, putting him in a position of control over the emperor's entertainment. He excelled in this role, coming up with ideas for pastimes that proved to be much to the emperor's liking.

Several groups within the imperial elites were alarmed with Liu Jin's promotion and the group's apparent influence over the young ruler, and so they began plotting against the Eight Tigers.

Three grand secretaries, inherited from the emperor's father and supported by the ministers, demanded the group's execution, while senior eunuchs insisted on banishment as a punishment that the Emperor would be more likely to consider. A joint plan was finally agreed upon and set in motion with a direct petition to the emperor, asking for Liu Jin's execution and banishment of the other members of the group from the imperial court.

Liu Jin was notified of the plot by one of his agents and led seven other eunuchs to ask for mercy before Emperor Zhengde on October 27, 1506.

The emperor heeded their plea, and on the following day it was announced that he would decide upon their fate at his leisure. All but one of the grand secretaries resigned immediately upon hearing the news and a number of senior officials followed suit.

The plot was averted and most checks on the eunuchs' power eliminated with it.

Liu Jin proceeded to retaliate against those who spoke out against him, leading to a string of dismissals, incidents of torture, and imprisonments of a number of high government figures.

In February 1507, twenty-one officials who had protested the dismissal of the senior grand secretaries were beaten and reduced to the status of commoners.

By the end of 1507, very few in the palace were willing to challenge the reign of terror of Liu Jin, who was known to many at the time as "Emperor Liu", and his fellow eunuchs.

== Members ==
=== Liu Jin 劉瑾 (1451-1510) ===
Liu Jin was from the area of Xingping, Shaanxi. He was born on February 28, 1451, into the Tan family. His original name was Tan Jin. He considered himself very eloquent, so he decided to become a eunuch, as he considered that his best path to success. After becoming a eunuch, he was adopted by another eunuch named Liu, and changed his name to Liu Jin.

He began working in the imperial palace in the 1480s, where he began to consolidate the group that later became the Eight Tigers. In 1492, he was removed from his post at the Chenghua emperor's tomb to serve the new heir apparent, the future Zhengde emperor. Liu became a favorite of his, and he became the head of the bureau of bells and drums after Zhengde's rise to the throne in 1505. From there, Liu Jin gradually gained more power and influence, and became known as the leader of the Eight Tigers.

Most Ming and modern historians regard Liu Jin's rise to power as tyrannic and describe him as "rapacious, cruel, and wily". He became the Head of the Directorate of Ceremonies, in which role he was notorious for altering rescripts in transit to and from the emperor. This meant he essentially controlled what the emperor knew and what the emperor approved. Later, he became the chief of the imperial staff, and became known for taking bribes from senior officials. For example, he required the thirteen provincial administration officials to pay him 20,000 taels of silver when they visited the capital, three times a year. He also was very influential in the military. At the height of his power, all military actions had to be approved by him, giving him more power than the generals.

After the re-establishment of the Western Depot under Gu Dayong, Liu Jin convinced the emperor to create the Neixinchang, or Inner Branch Depot, which would supervise direct dangers to the throne and the emperor's safety. This Depot was made supervisor to the other two, the East and West Depots, thus consolidating Liu Jin's power. The depot persecuted many of the opponents of Liu Jin and his policies. It is estimated that more than one thousand people were killed by the Inner Branch Depot.

From the money he gained through corruption, he went on to flaunt his glory and wealth by building a palace in his hometown.

During the fall of his reign, officials were sent to detain him and confiscate his belongings. During the house search, the officials found a total of 12,057,800 taels of gold and 259,583,600 taels of silver, as well as gems, false seals, and fans with concealed knives, ostensibly for use in his plot against the emperor. He was ordered to be executed by the punishment of death by a thousand cuts. He was cut 3,357 times over a period of three days.

=== Zhang Yong 張永 (1470-1532) ===
Zhang Yong, a native of Xincheng, Baoding, is fairly absent in historical records until his time in the Eight Tigers. During Emperor Zhengde's reign, he took control of many important posts and developed a tight bond between him and the Emperor. By doing this, he began to disregard the government's policies and plans. For instance, despite heavy opposition from the Ministry of Revenue, he successfully acquired some privatised land. He controlled the Eastern Depot, one of the secret police and intelligence operations that reported to the emperor. He also was given control of the Shen-Chi garrison, which had been established to practice with firearms. In 1510, Zhang Yong was appointed Supreme Commander of the military and sent to put down the Prince of Anhua's rebellion.

During Liu Jin's reign, Zhang Yong was his right-hand in the battlefield and at home. He did not get along with Liu Jin, but could not be removed from power due to his military prowess. He conspired with Yang Yiqing to remove Liu Jin from power, and became the most powerful member of the remaining Eight Tiger's after Liu Jin's death.

In October 1511, he asked the emperor to allow him to select 6,000 troops from the Capital Garrison reserves to be specially trained as assault forces for times of crisis. The emperor approved the request due to his need to fight the rebel forces of Liu the Sixth.

In July 1514, Zhang Yong was put in charge of an operation to defend against Mongol invasion.

However, after Emperor Zhengde's death, his status fell to that of a regular eunuch, and he was ordered to retire by the new emperor, Jiajing. However, by 1529 he had begun to regain some power, and was made the Grand Secretary of Integrated Divisions. He died shortly after this appointment.

=== Gao Feng 高鳳 (died 1526) ===
After the fall of Liu Jin, Gao Feng was made one of the new heads of the Directorate of Ceremonies, along with Wei Bin. Besides this, information on Gao Feng is limited.

=== Ma Yongcheng 馬永成 (1468-1526) ===
Ma Yongcheng was from the Bazhou or Wenan area. He grew rich off of the bandit situation, accepting bribes from them so they could gain favor with the emperor. Ma Yongcheng took control of the Eastern Depot, which operated as a spy and secret police agency during the Ming dynasty.

=== Gu Dayong 谷大用 ===
Gu Dayong is known for his place at the head of the Western Depot, a secret-police style intelligence agency. Emperor Zhengde reopened it in 1506 after 25 years of dormancy, with Gu Dayong as its leader, due to his desire to have a more comprehensive intelligence agency. The Western Depot was closed down after Liu Jin's arrest, although Emperor Zhengde still considered Gu Dayong quite favorably.

In August 1511, Gu Dayong was appointed overall superintendent of military affairs, and he led a group of troops south of the capital to fight the rebel forces of the Liu brothers. As a reward for defeating the rebellion, his younger and older brothers became earls.

Members of his family assumed important positions and roles inside the dynasty. For instance, Gu Dayong's father was given the right to command the Embroidered Uniform Guard alongside Zhang Young's father.

He also worked in charitable construction projects in Peking. In 1508, he donated a large bell to the Daoist Baiyunguan (White Cloud Temple), which had built a new hall. In 1510 and 1512, he restored the Southern Park's Lingtongmiao, the Yanfasi outside of the city's western gate, and the Huguosi (so that it could house Central Asian monks). He used donations from the emperor and the imperial family to carry out these projects, which seem to have been authorized and requested by the emperor. Gu Dayong also seems to have chosen at least one of his projects, restoring an old temple in the far Western Hills, turning it into "a bright and glittering precinct".

After the death of the Zhengde Emperor, he was temporarily honored, before being banished to Nanking, where he died.

=== Qiu Ju 丘聚 ===
He was in charge of the Eastern Depot, but lost his job after the arrest of Liu Jin. He does not have any of his own records, but is only mentioned sometimes in biographies of the other Eight Tigers. Besides this, information on Qiu Ju is limited.

=== Wei Bin 魏彬 ===
Wei Bin was given command of the san qian ying (三千營) garrison, which was made of 3,000 barbarians who had surrendered to the throne. Wei Bin is also known for building the Hongshangshi. He used divination to find a suitable burial place in Peking's southern suburbs, and built Hongshangshi there in 1514. The land was officially endowed by the emperor, and the temple became known as Sir Wei's Temple. It was famous for its crab-apple orchards and other unusual trees. After Liu Jin's execution, Wei Bin was made one of the heads of the Directorate of Ceremonies, along with Gao Feng. Wei Bin was made to retire upon the ascension of the Jiajing Emperor.

=== Luo Xiang 羅祥 ===
There is almost no available information on Luo Xiang, although it is known that he was a member of the Eight Tigers.

== Political influence ==
=== The Zhengde Emperor ===
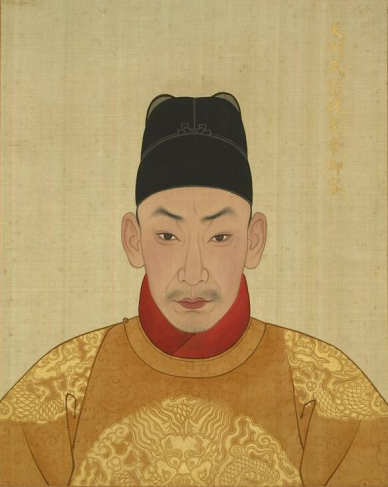
The Zhengde Emperor, also known as Emperor Wuzong

At the beginning of the Zhengde Emperor's reign, Liu Jin and seven other eunuchs who had served him were added to his personal staff. He ignored the advice of his grand secretaries, who told him to limit the roles of his eunuchs in government. Having been raised by eunuchs, he liked them, and, starting in 1506, he gave them important financial and military roles. He enjoyed spending time with them, practicing riding, archery, wrestling, and music. Liu Jin was responsible for palace entertainment, and "provided dancing, wrestling matches, a menagerie of exotic animals, and of course, music". He also encouraged the Zhengde Emperor to leave the palace in disguise to explore the streets of Peking, which the emperor grew to love. He was thus disinterested in ruling his own government, so he began to leave matters of state solely to his eunuchs.

Since he didn't want to deal with matters of state, he left most of the empire's affairs to the eunuchs. For instance, he needed money to implement various imperial projects, but did not want to use his personal funds, so he listened to and implemented the ideas of the Eight Tigers, which mostly meant raising new taxes.

Although Zhengde spent all his money and time on palace entertainments, the Eight Tigers never criticized him and always obeyed his wishes, which caused him to trust them greatly. One example of this is when, in 1516, he decided he wanted to leave the imperial palace and move to Xuanhua for a more entertaining life. Since his grand secretaries and many other officials opposed this, he was prevented from doing so. On September 8, 1517, he attempted the move again, instructing Gu Dayong not to let anyone else follow him past the Juyong pass on the way to Xuanhua. Due to Gu Dayong's dutiful execution of this order, the other government officials could do nothing but wait until the emperor got bored with his new life and returned to Peking in 1518.

Zhengde's trust in his eunuchs transcended many attempts to remove the Eight Tigers from power. He gave them dragon robes to wear, which symbolized that they were immune to charges for any crimes they might have committed. The only real challenge to this trust manifested in the arrest of Liu Jin, who had always been his favorite, and was accomplished only with the help of all the other Eight Tigers.

=== Policies and reforms ===
Government control

After the failed 1506 petition to remove the Eight Tigers from power, Liu Jin began removing anyone opposed to him. In March 1507, he issued an edict that made him and the other Eight Tigers equal in rank and authority to the highest provincial officials, as well as the right to investigate any administrative or judicial matter. All official documents had to be approved by him first before they could be sent to the ministries or grand secretariat. He also broke custom by sentencing officials to punishment by cangue for minor offenses, namely, not acknowledging his authority, which had previously never been used on officials, and only for serious crimes. Liu Jin had control of the imperial administration in both the capital and the provinces by the summer of 1507.

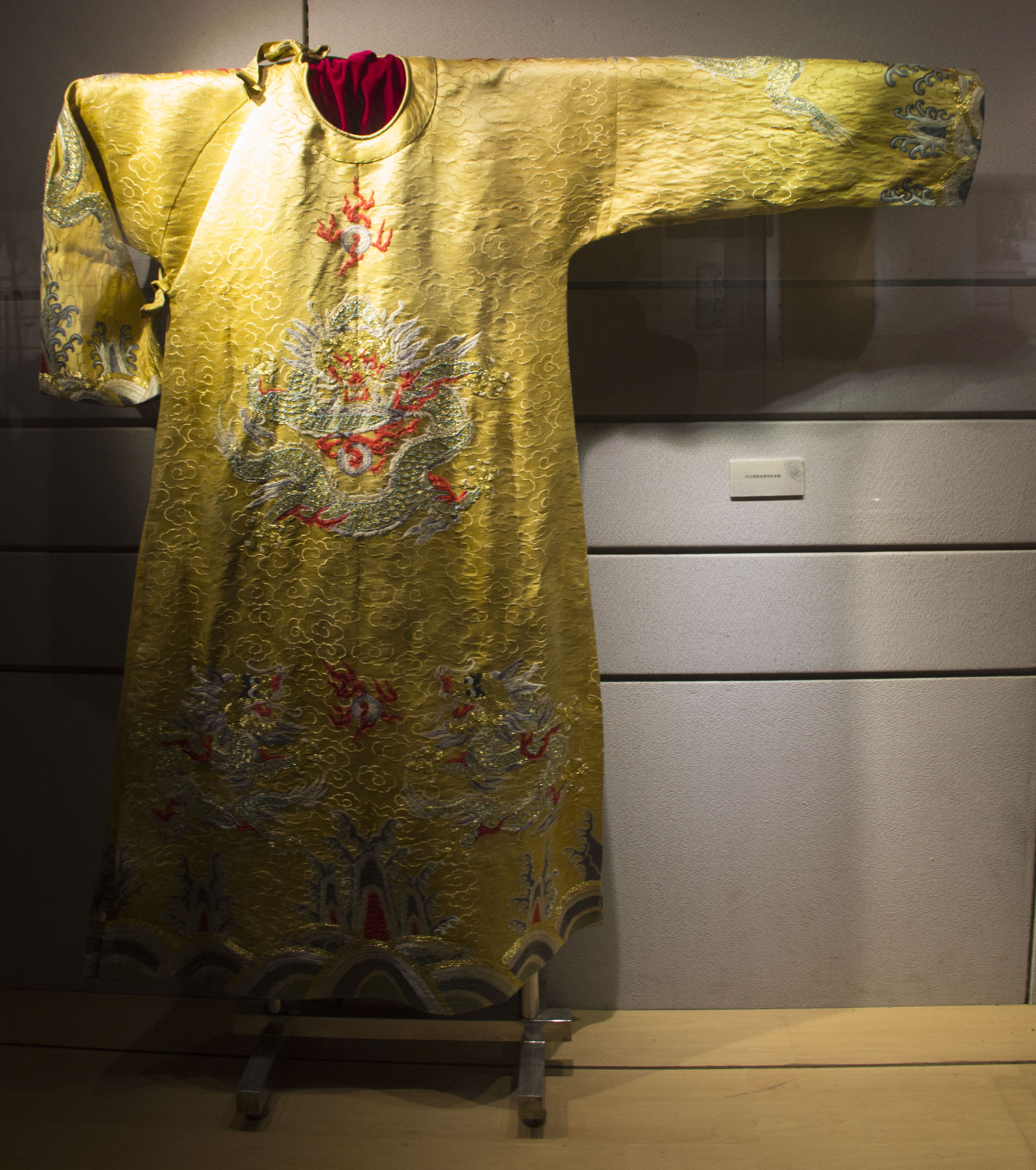
The dragon robe which the Zhengde emperor gifted to the Eight Tigers to wear, even though it had traditionally been a privilege reserved only for royalty

The eunuchs were able to expand their roles within the palace to control the rest of the government structure. Many of these positions became available for the Eight Tigers after the governmental purge after the 1506 petition. For instance, the eunuch Director of Ceremonies usually controlled the Western or Eastern Depots, as well as the Embroidered-Uniform guard, who "exercised almost unlimited police and governmental authority", with a greatly feared prison.

The Depots, which were intelligence and terror organizations, were run by the Eight Tigers. Qiu Ju ran the Eastern Depot, Gu Dayong ran the Western Depot, and Liu Jin ran the Inner Branch Depot. Many suspects, including Imperial Ministers, censors, soldiers, and civilians, were arrested, beaten heavily, and sometimes killed. The Inner Branch Depot's embroidered-uniform guards conducted much of the beating and torture. Those arrested number in the several thousands. The Western and Inner Branch Depots were shut down after Liu Jin's arrest for extortion, although the emperor remained fond of Gu Dayong and contemplated reopening the Western Depot. There was too much backlash, however, and it remained closed. The Eastern Depot, on the other hand, remained operational for the next few years, under different directors, until its disbandment after Emperor Zhengde's death.

When he was in power, Liu Jin managed to drastically change government structure in the favor of him and his fellow eunuchs, but he was aiming for much more that was never realized. He wanted to create an empire where eunuchs were the superiors of every official in every branch of government, a scale which would have been unprecedented in Chinese history. Most of his radical reforms to this end are not known, because they were rigorously opposed by the civil officials and so were never implemented.

Financial

In 1506, Liu Jin was given the task of raising revenue for the emperor. He claimed that the decline in revenues was due to mismanagement and corruption, and decided to run a general investigation and fine the ineffective officials. Liu Jin implemented many new taxes and worked against corruption and ineffectiveness of government officials. He also became known for accepting large bribes.

For example, in June 1508, Liu ordered grain inventory inspections. He dispatched secretaries and censors around China to see how much fodder and hay had been purchased, as well as if it had been changed for silver or remained in storage in the warehouses. He also targeted abuses by the local elites, punishing ineffectual officials with jail time or heavy fines paid in grain, which was then shipped to the north and west. In Fukien and Szechwan, Liu Jin added a surtax on silver mines, even though the officials had reported that there was no more silver in them. Since he gave heavy fines to officials who displeased him, many began to pay him bribes to avoid those fines.

Liu Jin also implemented surveys of the military agricultural colonies, which is what eventually led to the Prince of Anhua rebellion in 1510.

== Resistance to the Eight Tigers ==
Early opposition

Censor Jiang Qin objected to Liu Jin driving important officials out of office. Calling Liu Jin "a minor servant", he questioned why the emperor should trust Liu Jin so fully when everyone else hated and feared him. He also stated he would give his head if it meant removing Liu Jin from power. For these statements, Jiang Qin was given 30 lashes and imprisoned. Three days later, he again urged Zhengde to execute Liu Jin, but he was beaten again. Finally, after a final flogging, he died.

After Liu Jin was appointed as the head of the imperial household in June 1506, the grand secretaries were alarmed. They questioned the action but were ignored.

=== Han Wen's 1506 petition ===
The first real plan to remove Liu Jin from power came from other senior eunuchs who felt threatened by his influence. They wanted him either banished to Nanking or executed. On October 27, 1506, Han Wen, the minister of revenue, submitted a petition to the emperor, requesting that he execute the Eight Tigers. The emperor was unwilling to consider this. Minister of personal Hsu Chin warned that the emperor would not change his mind on so drastic a request, but the grand secretaries were resolute, and convinced the senior eunuchs to get the emperor to sign the petition. The court officials agreed to ask the emperor to carry out the sentence on the morning of October 28.

However, one of Liu Chin's agents in the court told him about the plan. On the night of October 27, the Eight Tigers begged the emperor for mercy. Liu Jin told the emperor that it was all a conspiracy and that the eunuch Director of Ceremonies was cooperating with the grand secretaries to limit the emperor's power. The emperor believed Liu Jin, and removed the conspirators from their posts, designating Liu Jin as Director of Ceremonies. The rest of the Eight Tigers took over several other important eunuch agencies and military positions. The deposed senior eunuchs were banished to Nanking, but were assassinated en route.

On October 28, 1506, the morning the court had agreed would be the end of the Eight Tigers, the officials realized that something was strange when they were all summoned to the morning audience. A senior official announced that the emperor had decided he would decide what to do about the Eight Tigers by himself. Almost all the grand secretaries then resigned, realizing the battle was lost, and Liu Jin accepted the resignations personally.

Liu Jin went on to consolidate his control and exact revenge on those who had opposed him. He framed Han Wen for fraud, and dismissed him on December 13, 1506. In February 1507, the twenty-one senior officials who had protested the removal of the grand secretaries were beaten and given commoner status. From then on, officials who opposed Liu Jin were beaten, tortured, and dismissed.

=== 1508 anonymous letter ===
On July 23, 1508, a group of eunuchs submitted an anonymous letter to the emperor about Liu Jin's crimes. Liu Jin thought it must have been written by an official, and began investigating them, arresting all the palace officials. He released them once he discovered a eunuch had written the letter, and then he established a security agency to investigate them. He banished the eunuchs involved to Nanking.

=== The Prince of Anhua rebellion ===
Liu Jin raised the tax rate in Shaanxi, and he had tax delinquents arrested and beaten. This angered the soldiers in the province. The local prince, Prince Anhua, was already angry about the power of the eunuchs. He believed that they gained their positions through persuasiveness, not through any real helpfulness to the empire. Therefore, Prince Anhua decided to take the opportunity to rebel. On May 12, 1510, he held a banquet, then had the soldiers come in and kill the officials, officers, and eunuchs in attendance. He then announced he was raising an army to defeat Liu Jin. However, the rebellion only lasted 19 days before he was betrayed by one of his own cavalry commanders. Zhang Yong and Yang Yiqing, who had been dispatched to defeat the rebellion, arrived to escort the prince back to the capital for his execution.

=== Internal opposition to Liu Jin ===
Liu Jin was not on good terms with Zhang Yong, who could not be removed from his post like Liu Jin's other enemies due to his military prowess. Liu Jin considered himself the dictator of the rest of the Eight Tigers, and often delegated the work he did not want to do to them. This attitude caused the rest of the Eight Tigers to resent him as well. This rift led to the eventual toppling of Liu Jin.

== Fall from power ==
=== Liu Jin ===
By 1510, the relations between Liu Jin and Zhang Yong had significantly deteriorated. As an inspector of the army, Zhang Yong was sent to Shaanxi to oversee the suppression of the Prince of Anhua's rebellion by the imperial forces. His companion during the travels was Yang Yiqing, the supreme commander of the army, who was once forced out of office by Liu Jin in 1507 and held a grudge against him. Yang Yiquing managed to convince the eunuch that Liu Jin was planning an operation that would put Zhang Yong's life in danger. He claimed that Liu Jin was planning to assassinate the emperor and put his own grand-nephew on the throne, and that the plan would begin on September 17, 1510.

On September 13, the emperor held a banquet with the Eight Tigers, and Liu Jin left first. Zhang Yong told the emperor about Liu Jiu's plan, and he and the rest of the Eight Tigers convinced him to send guards to arrest Liu Jin and confiscate his property. The emperor decided he was guilty when he saw Liu Jin's hordes of wealth.

At his trial, Liu Jin at first tried his normal tactics of controlling those who defied him. He appealed to the people who he claimed he had helped over the years, saying they owed him. When an imperial consort asked why he had so much armor hidden away if not to attack the emperor, he stopped speaking. The emperor was convinced, and Liu Jin was sentenced to death by a thousand cuts. The execution began on September 27 and lasted for 3 days. His property was taken and used to prop up the emperor's finances.

=== After Liu Jin ===
The execution of Liu Jin, which took place in 1510, greatly diminished the ability of the group to influence the emperor's decisions. The system built by Liu Jin that bestowed significant authority upon the eunuchs was swiftly dismantled by the government officials after his death. However, the Zhengde emperor continued to entrust the remaining members of the Eight Tigers with authority. He still needed financial security, so he gave the eunuchs the power to take whatever supplies and labor they needed from civil officials, in order to make their jobs easier. He appointed Wei Bin and Gao Feng as the new Directors of Ceremonies, and had the rest continue to run the garrisons and surveillance agencies.

After the death of the Zhengde emperor, many of the Eight Tigers were banished.

== Legacy ==
Confucian scholars viewed the eunuchs as usurpers, as they rose to power independent of the examination system.

Additionally, the imperial censors, who sometimes criticized powerful eunuchs directly to the emperor, viewed the defeat of Liu Jin as a victory for the strength of China's empire. In 1624, censor Yang Lien implored the emperor to impeach eunuch Wei Zhongxian in a letter which said that eunuchs must be kept from interfering in anything outside palace life. He mentioned Liu Jin: "Even such arrogant and lawless eunuchs as Wang Zhen and Liu Jin were promptly executed. Thus the dynasty lasted until today".

In the histories, written by the Confucian scholars, eunuchs, including the Eight Tigers and especially Liu Jin, are portrayed negatively. Liu Jin is blamed for the outbreak of rebellions at the end of Emperor Zhengde's reign. In the earliest complete narrative of the 1510 rebellion, "Rebellion Quelled at Jianghuai", written in 1513, Wang Ao argued that Liu Jin was responsible for the rebellion, writing, "In the early Zhengde reign, the traitorous eunuch unlawfully seized the power of the sovereign. By [his] cruel punishments and tyranny, [he] poisoned all within the seas. All within the seas was confused and in upheaval. [When] the traitorous eunuch was executed, the masses of bandits/rebels arose". In Jianghai jianqu ji, Zhu Yunming asserted that Liu Jin's abuses pushed the empire to rebellion.

One Ming historian who portrays Liu Jin in a more positive light is Liao Xinyi in "A Brief Study of Liu Jin's 'Change of Established Regulations", in which he argues that the grain inventory inspections were motivated more by the need to supplement the grain of the northern and western borders than by a desire by Liu Jin to extract bribes or revenge.

In the Veritable Records of Wuzong, Liu Jin is again described in a very negative way. There seems to be disagreement on his relation to the rebellions, for while it is agreed that he sometimes worked tirelessly to stop banditry, it is also sometimes claimed that he was personally linked to the bandits and supported them in their rebellions. It is true that rebellions rose along with Liu Jin's fall, but the relationship between those events is unclear.

Nishimura Gensho, the leading Japanese scholar of the 1510 rebellion, attributes the rebellion to the weakness of Emperor Zhengde as his court was overrun by scheming eunuchs. He claims that the extensive intelligence network run by the eunuchs caused the empire to fall into a period of panic, and that the imperial estates uprooted peasants from their land and livelihoods, lending more support to the rebellion.

=== The powerful eunuch ===
The dragon cloaks worn by the emperor's chosen Eight Tigers came to symbolize great power, which was desirable to young men trying to make a career. The Eight Tigers convinced many young boys and men to become castrated, as they believed that was the path towards a successful life.

Overall, the Eight Tigers add credence to the many stories told in the classical Chinese histories and in modern scholarship about how much power eunuchs had in imperial China. In a book of classical Chinese tales, the Eight Tigers and their infamy are mentioned several times. A few examples: Liu Jin, as head of the Inner Branch Depot, was powerful enough to demand that officials kneel before him and to order flogging punishments, sometimes until death. The Inner Branch Depot is infamous for arresting people numbering in the several thousands. It also mentions the Eastern Depot, calling it an "imperial terror establishment" and "Gestapo-like organization".

== Cultural references ==
=== Classical culture ===
Liu Jin is featured in several plays and novels.

Hang Kai, who was instrumental in Lin Jiu's removal from power, wrote many plays featuring Liu Jin, as they were both from Xinping.

However, the most famous play with Liu Jin, Famensi (Famen Temple) became popular during the Qing Dynasty, with its earliest known record being in 1845. This classic Peking Opera included the lines, "My last name is Liu, my first name is Jin… At age seven, I was castrated and entered the imperial palace two years later… I helped Emperor Zhengde ascend the throne". In the play, Liu Jin is a painted-face role (xiahualian), whose face is painted red to indicate Liu Jin's "rough characteristics and compelling power".

Famen Temple tells the story of a famous murder case. The murderers got away, and an innocent man was falsely accused. Liu Jin ordered the court to be reviewed, which led to the punishment of the perpetrators. Throughout the play, he is decisive, but his decisions are backed up or checked by the Empress Dowager. The play thus portrays Liu Jin in a relatively positive light. Famen Temple is a famous classic opera, and was a favorite of Empress Dowager Cixi. It has a famous video recording from 1950 and a few famous audio recordings.

At least two novels written in the Qing dynasty feature Liu Jin in a treacherous plot. In Bajian qixia wuyi pingmen qianhou zhuan and Sanmenjie, Liu Jin lures the emperor from the capital's safety to Suzhou, promising him beautiful women and scenery. Using his connections with three bandit chiefs, who have an army of ten-thousand men based in Qingzhou, Shandong, Liu Jin has the imperial entourage attacked. The emperor is saved by the bravery of a set of fraternal twins.

=== Popular culture ===
The Eight Tigers are featured as the main antagonists in the 2015 video game Assassin's Creed Chronicles: China, in which they are portrayed as high-ranking members of the Templar Order who hold significant power and influence in China. The game revolves around the protagonist, Shao Jun, hunting down the Tigers one by one as revenge for their purge of the Chinese Assassin Brotherhood years prior. Only five of the Tigers are featured as targets—Gao Feng, Gu Dayong (renamed Yu Dayong in the game), Wei Bin, Qiu Ju, and Zhang Yong—while the others are mentioned, having died before the events of the game itself.

== See also ==
- Prince of Anhua rebellion
- Wei Bin's Temple Bell
- Wei Zhongxian
- Li Lianying
