= Bijethua Mahavir =

Temple

Coordinates: 26°06′49″N 82°25′47″E

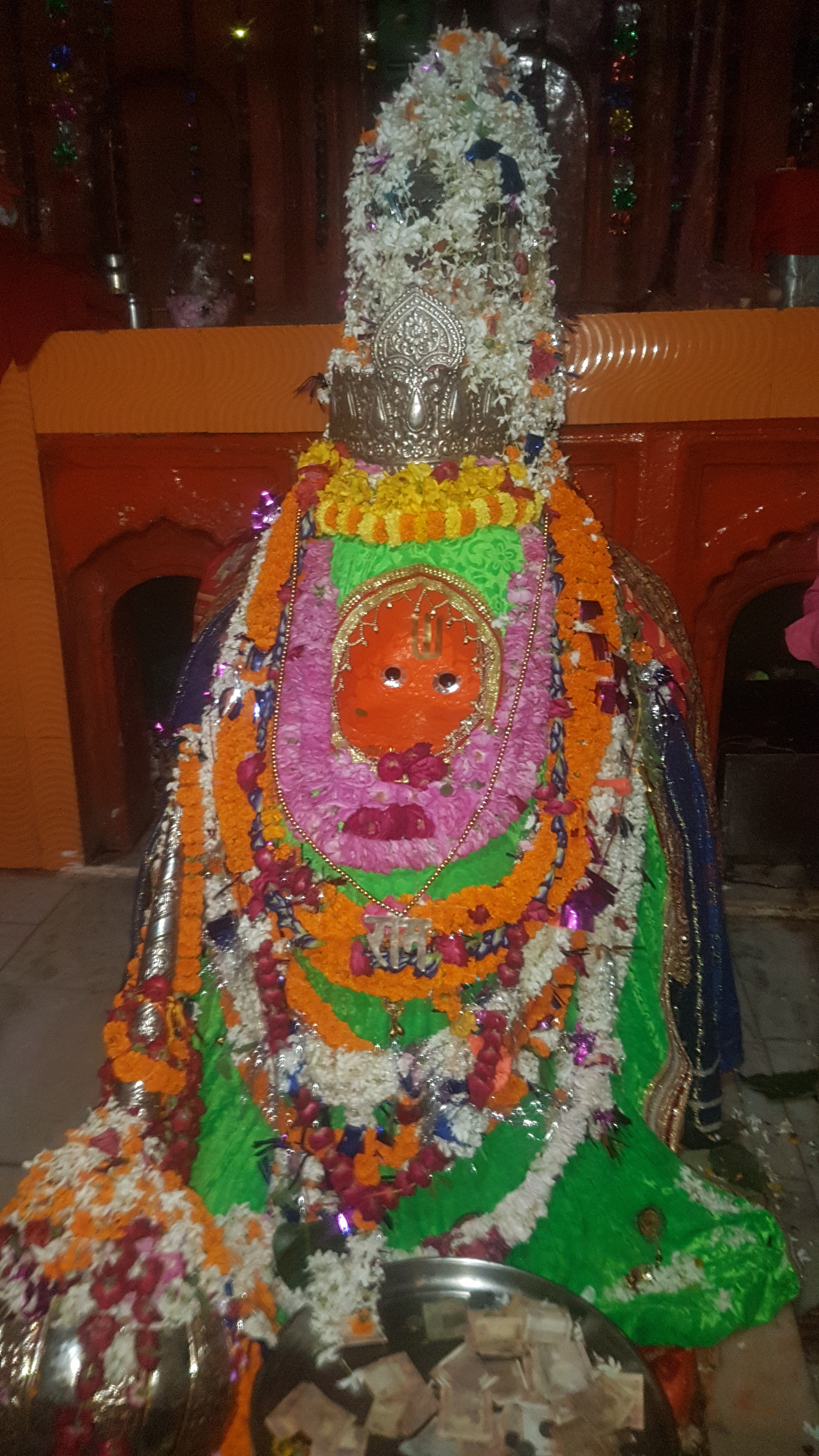
Bijethua Mahavir Dham

The Bijethua Mahavir (Bijethua Dham) is a temple situated in Sultanpur district, Uttar Pradesh, India. It is a popular spot for worship; many visit to pay homage to Lord Hanuman.

The temple is mentioned in the Ramayana; Lord Hanuman defeated Kaalnemi at the temple.

Bijethua Mahavir is also known for having more bells than any other temple.

The name of priest of bijethua mandir is Shivam pandey
