= Zhang Yong (eunuch) =

Chinese eunuch (1465–1529)

- 張永
- Born: 17 August 1465; Baoding, Hebei
- Died: 8 February 1529 (aged 63)
- Occupation: Eunuch

Chinese name
- Traditional Chinese: 張永
- Simplified Chinese: 张永
Transcriptions
Standard Mandarin
- Hanyu Pinyin: Zhāng Yǒng

Zhang Yong (Note: Zhang Yong used the courtesy name Deting (德廷) and the art name Shouan (守庵).) (17 August 1465 – 8 February 1529) was a Chinese eunuch of the Ming dynasty who held an influential position in the government of the Zhengde Emperor from 1506 to 1521. He was part of a group of eunuchs known as the "Eight Tigers" who had served the Zhengde Emperor since his childhood. When the Zhengde Emperor ascended to the throne in 1505, the Tigers were given promotions and gained significant power within the Forbidden City. Zhang specifically commanded the artillery of the Beijing garrison. After the Emperor's death, Zhang lost his positions and titles and was relocated to Nanjing.

== Biography ==
Zhang Yong was born on 17 August 1465 in Baoding, a city in the northern Chinese province of Hebei, during the Ming dynasty. He entered the imperial palace as a eunuch at the age of 10 and, in 1496, was assigned to serve Zhu Houzhao, the young son and heir apparent of the Hongzhi Emperor. In 1505, the Hongzhi Emperor died and Zhu Houzhao ascended to the throne as the Zhengde Emperor. The Emperor favored the eunuchs he had grown up with over civil officials, and his grand secretaries found it difficult to express their concerns about eunuch management. He especially favored the "Eight Tigers", which included Zhang Yong and the influential Liu Jin.

The Zhengde Emperor appointed Zhang as the director of the palace carpentry workshops (yuyongjian), and in 1506 gave him command of the Artillery Camp (Shenjiying) in the Beijing garrison. (Note: At the same time, the remaining Eight Tigers took command of the Three Great Camps: Liu Jin was given command of the infantry in the Five Armies Camp (Wujunying) and Wei Bin was given command of the cavalry in the Three Thousand Camp (Sanqianying). Each of these three eunuch-commanders was assisted by one hundred eunuchs.) In May 1510, Zhu Zhifan, Prince of Anhua, led a rebellion in Shaanxi in opposition to Liu Jin's reforms. Local troops suppressed the rebellion within eighteen days, and the Emperor sent Zhang with an army of 30,000 to quell the rebellion. The Emperor also dispatched Yang Yiqing, an official familiar with the local area, to assist in the situation. While working together to resolve the conflict, Yang convinced Zhang that he was in danger of being overthrown by Liu Jin in another coup.

Upon his return to Beijing, Zhang was hailed as a national hero. The Emperor personally welcomed him at Dong'an Gate and rewarded him with an increase of 48 dan of rice to his annual salary, 500 liang of silver, and 50 suits of silk. Zhang then joined forces with the other six Tigers excluding Liu Jin, and on 13 September 1510, they accused Liu of plotting against the Emperor. Despite the Emperor's initial reluctance to believe in Liu's betrayal, he eventually succumbed to their persuasion. The following day, Liu was transferred to Nanjing and his property was confiscated. The Emperor ordered Liu's execution upon seeing the weapons and vast treasures that he had accumulated. Zhang's own reputation soon came under scrutiny as he was accused of accepting bribes. He was stripped of all his ranks and titles.

In 1514, as relations with the Mongols on the northern border deteriorated, the Emperor once again promoted Zhang. He was reinstated as the leader of the palace carpentry workshops and was also appointed as commander-in-chief in Datong and Xuanfu. Under Zhang's leadership, the Ming successfully pushed the Mongols beyond the borders.

After the Zhengde Emperor's death in 1521, his successor, the Jiajing Emperor, stripped Zhang of his rank and transferred him to Nanjing. Owing to the support of Yang Yiqing, Zhang was recalled to Beijing in 1526. In 1527, at Yang's recommendation, the Jiajing Emperor restored him to office as director of the palace carpentry workshops and placed him in charge of the military training corps. Finding the military in decline, Zhang proposed reforms to revitalize the imperial forces, but died on 8 February 1529 before any of them could be implemented.
