= Wei Bin's Temple Bell =

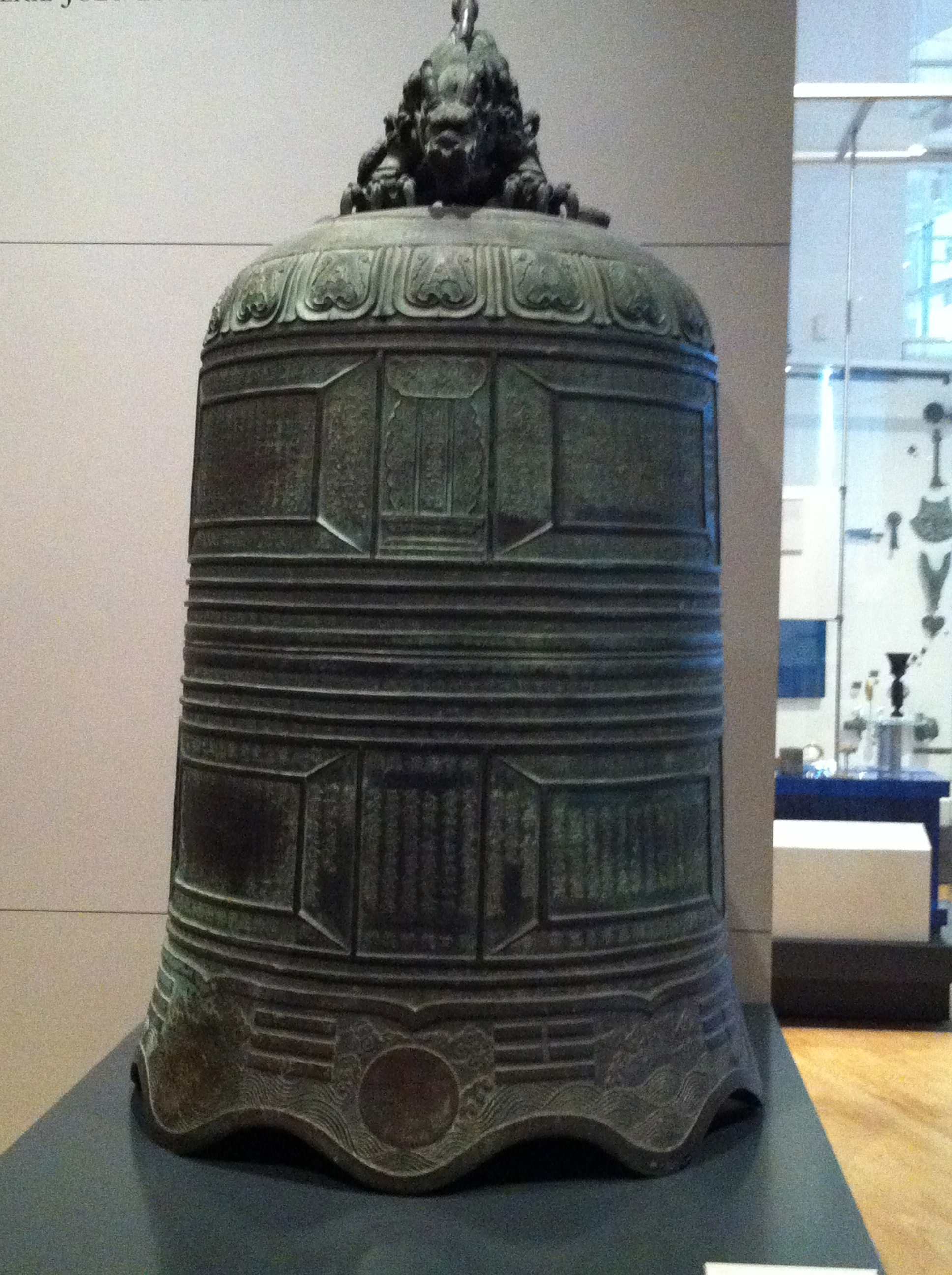
Wei Bin Bell - Collection in Royal Ontario Museum.

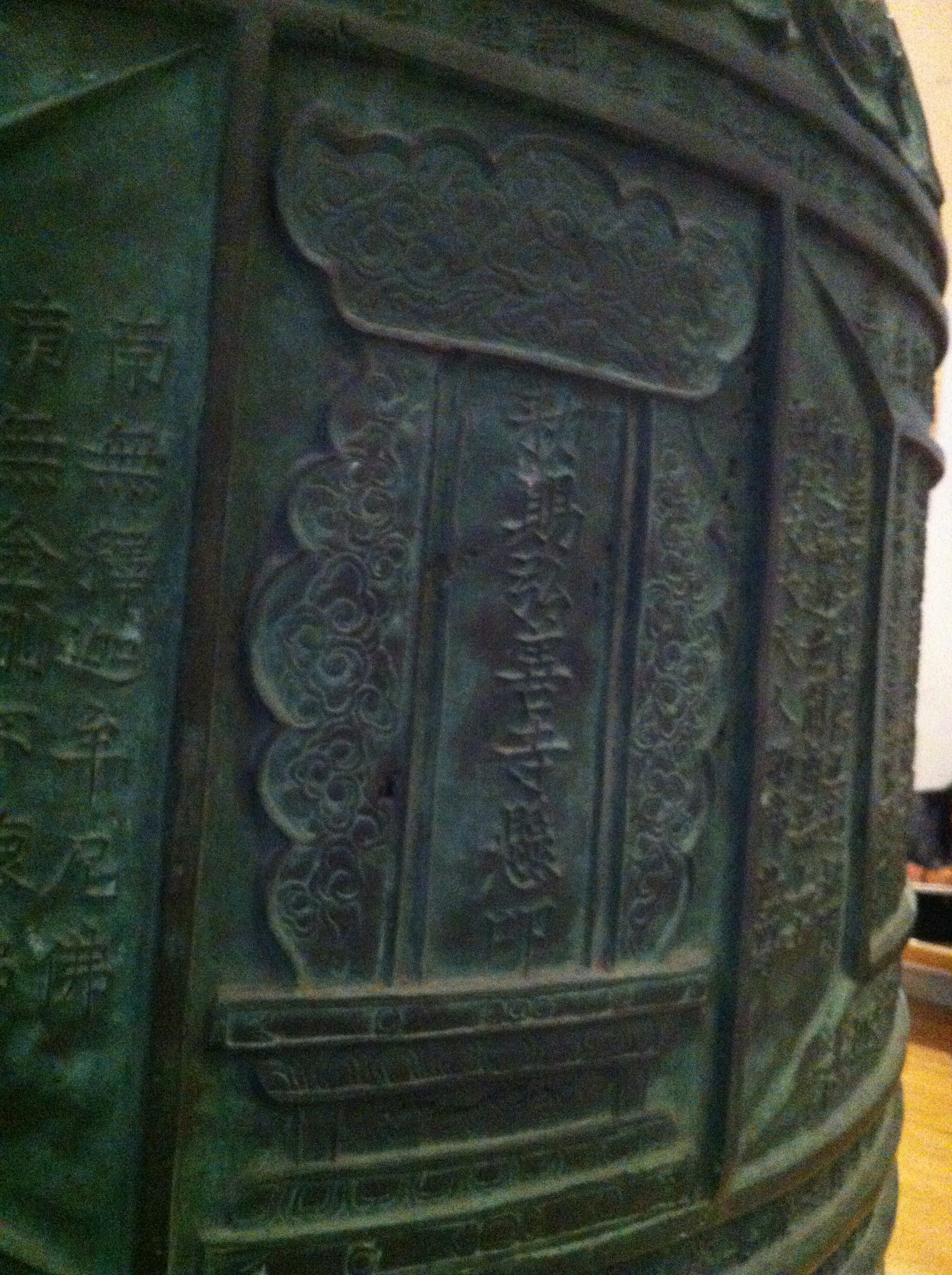
Text stated: "Suspended with imperial permission in the Hongshan Si"

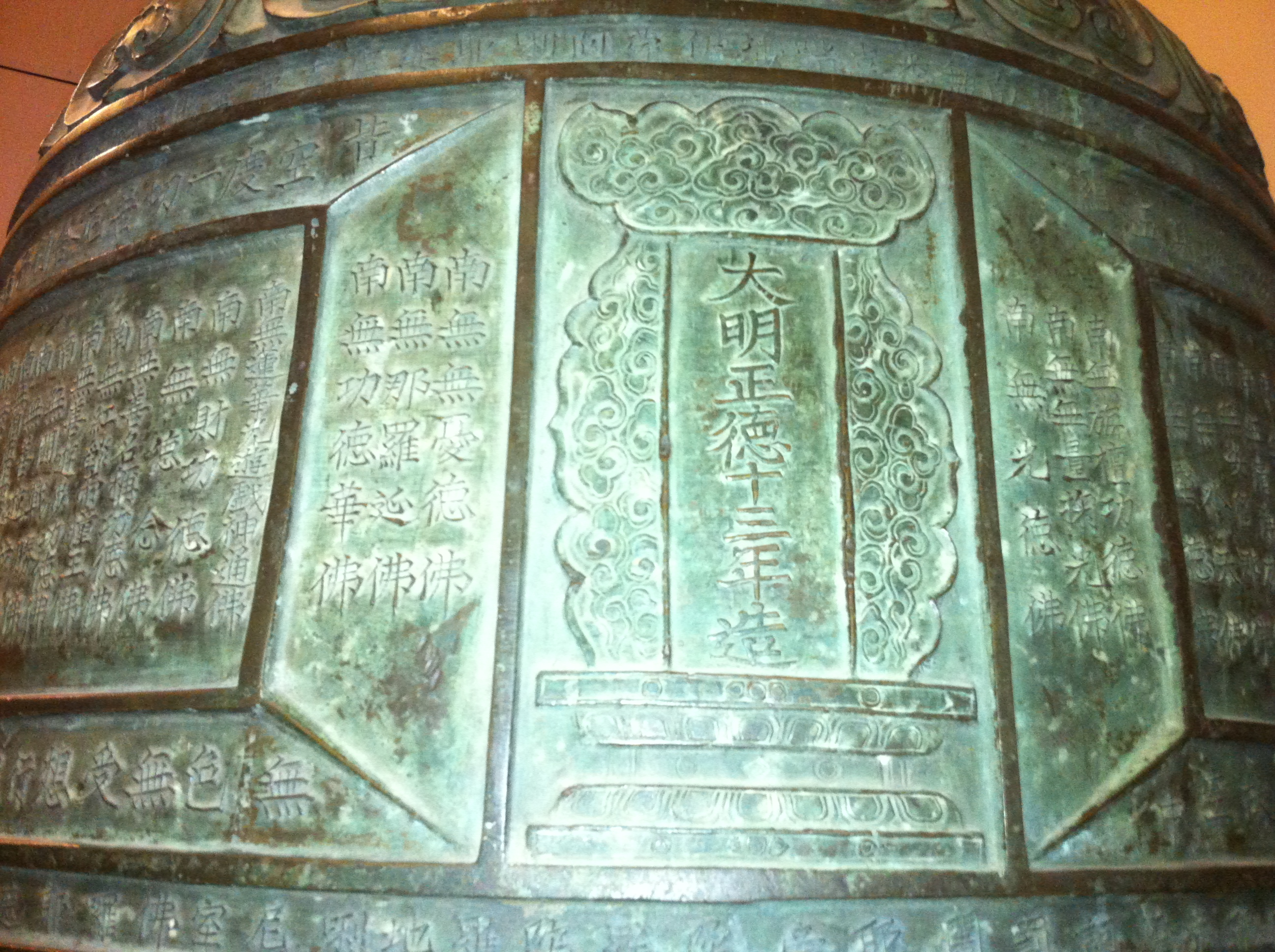
Text stated: "Temple Bell was made in the 13th year of the Zhengde era."

Wei Bin's Temple Bell has been in a collection in the Royal Ontario Museum since 1920. It is located on the first floor near the Chinese Galleries entrance and belongs to the George Crofts Collection (Ref No.: 920.1.20.). Wei Bin's Temple Bell is made of Bronze, is 200 cm in height, 114 cm in diameter, and is cylindrical in shape with a domed top and flared wavelike rim.

== Historical background ==
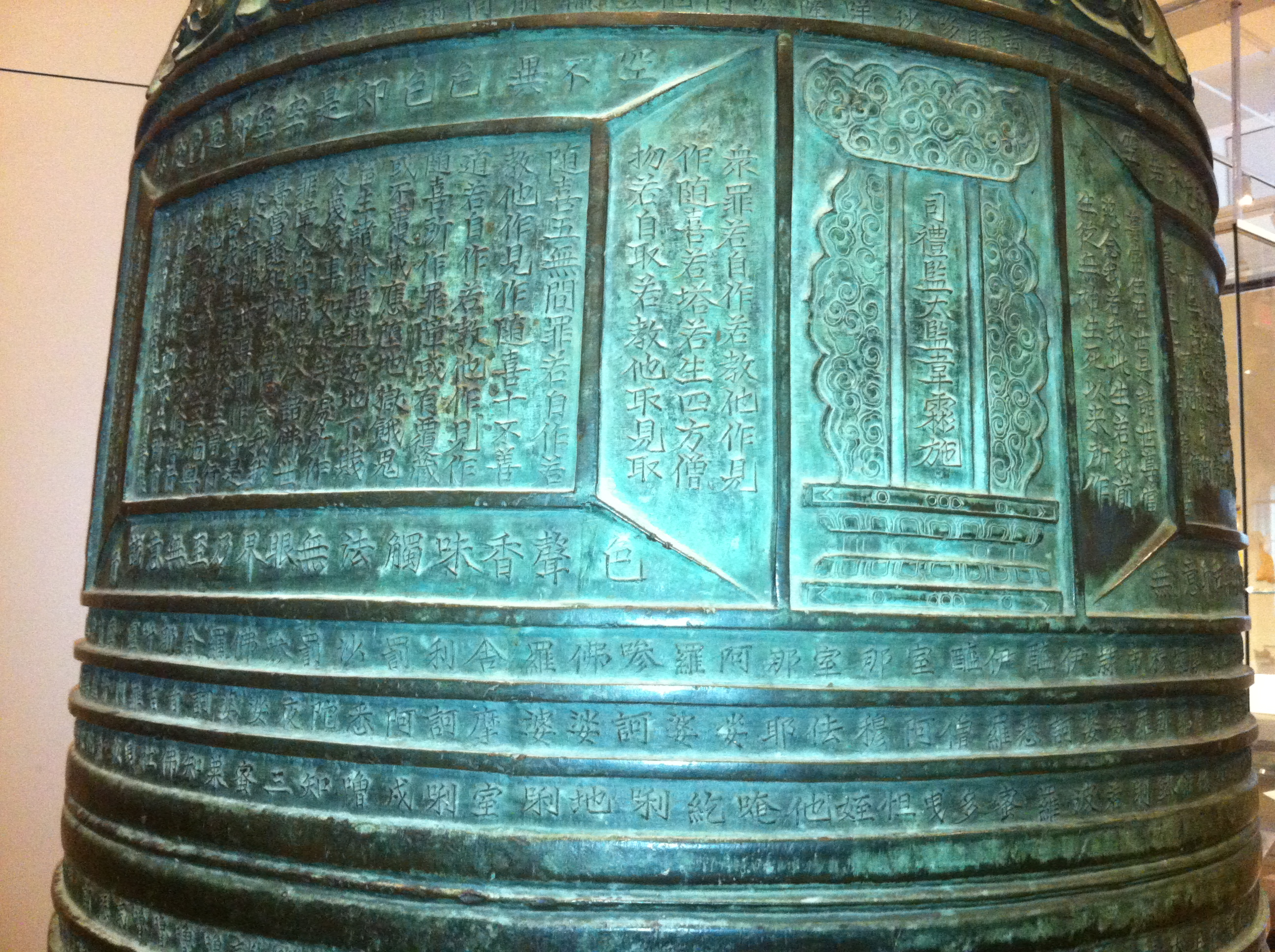
Text stated: "Bestowed by the Director of Ceremonial Wei Bin."

The carved words on the bell state that Wei Bin's Temple Bell was made in the 13th year of the Zhengde regnal period of the Ming Dynasty, which was 1518. The bell was bestowed by the Director of Ceremonial (司禮監) Wei Bin. (Note: Wei Bin's name is spelt variously 韋霦, 韋彬, 魏彬.)

Zhengde delegated his powers to his chief eunuch Liu Jin. When Liu Jin died in 1510, Wei Bin took his place as Director of Ceremonial, a powerful office with responsibilities over the emperor's correspondence, the imperial seal, and palace rituals. Wei Bin was regarded as one of the Eight Tigers (八虎), also referred to as the "Gang of Eight" (八黨).

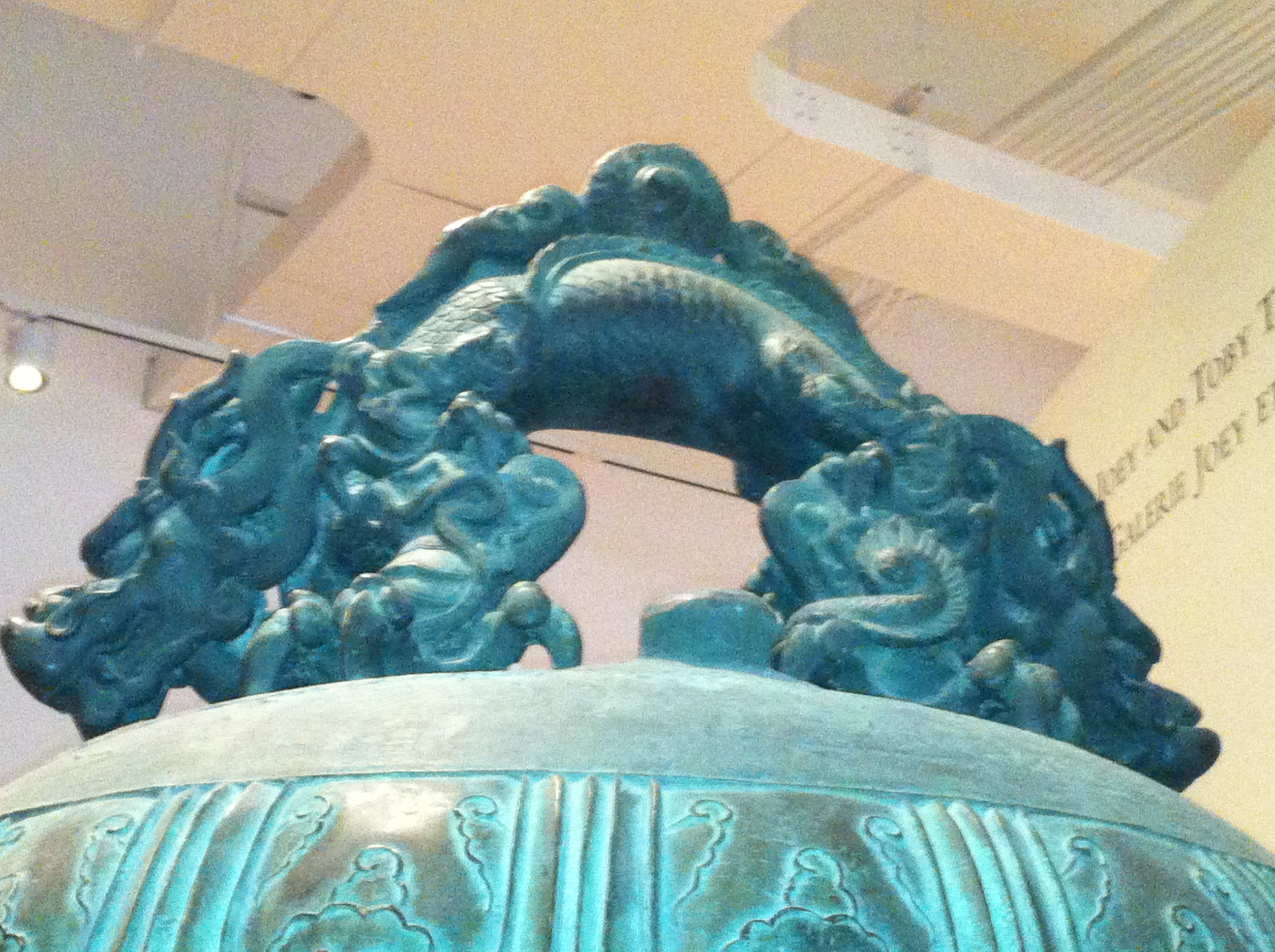
Two dragon heads on the top of the bell with a lotus lappets

== Temple location ==
As stated on the bell, it was suspended, with imperial permission, in the Hongshan Si (弘善寺; Temple of Great Bounty) in Beijing, just outside the Zuoan Gate (左安門). In the Ming Dynasty, this area was a suburb of the palace Forbidden City.

Text on the Temple Bell

== Museum ==
George Crofts (1872–1925) acquired the bell for the museum. He found it in the former Austro-Hungarian Legation, where it had been brought, reportedly by Italian troops, after the Boxer uprising of 1900.

== Patterns on the bell ==
On the top of the Bell, a 2-heads-no-tails dragon appears, with four legs and five toes on each leg. The wall is divided into panels and bands by raised lines and filled with cartouches containing a dedicatory inscription. Around the lower edge, the eight trigrams in a band separated by cloud, and a band of waves runs around the lower edge. Most of the text is from the Sutra of the Names of the 35 Buddhas and the Vinaya Sutra.
