= Prince of Anhua rebellion =

1510 rebellion in China

Date	12–30 May 1510
Location	China
Result	Prince of Anhua defeated

Belligerents
Prince of Anhua	Ming dynasty

Commanders and leaders
Zhu Zhifan	Zhengde Emperor; Qiu Yue; Yang Yiqing

Chinese name
- Traditional Chinese: 安化王之亂
- Simplified Chinese: 安化王之乱
Transcriptions
Standard Mandarin
- Hanyu Pinyin: Ānhuà wáng zhīluàn

The Prince of Anhua rebellion, or the Prince of Anhua's uprising, was a rebellion in China led by Zhu Zhifan, the Prince of Anhua, against the reigning Zhengde Emperor of the Ming dynasty. The rebellion took place in Ningxia, one of the nine military regions along the Mongolian frontier. In 1510, Liu Jin, a court eunuch who held significant power in the government thanks to the trust and support of the Zhengde Emperor, sent officials to Ningxia to enforce tax increases on military households and punish tax debtors, provoking anger and discontent among the local population. Taking advantage of the situation, Zhu Zhifan launched the rebellion on 12 May, declaring it a campaign against Liu Jin. The rebels seized control of the city of Ningxia and eliminated the leading local generals and officials, but the rebellion did not spread beyond the city’s immediate surroundings. In response to the rebellion, pro-government commanders in the region began gathering troops, while the government in Beijing appointed experienced military leaders familiar with local conditions—the general Shen Ying and the official Yang Yiqing—to organize the suppression of the uprising. As reinforcement for the local forces, the government also dispatched more than thirty thousand soldiers from the Beijing garrison against the rebels under the command of the eunuch Zhang Yong.

The rebellion ended with little significant fighting on 30 May 1510, after lasting 18 days. Qiu Yue, who had pretended to support the rebels, led a group of pro-government soldiers in occupying the palace of the Prince of Anhua and capturing him. Government forces then cleared the city and its surrounding areas of rebel presence, apprehending or eliminating the rebel leaders. After the arrival of Shen Ying, Yang Yiqing, and Zhang Yong in Ningxia, an investigation into the rebellion was conducted, compensation was provided for the damages, and the captured rebels were transported to Beijing for punishment. Nearly one hundred rebels were executed, while twice as many were exiled. The Prince of Anhua was ultimately ordered to commit suicide.

== Background ==
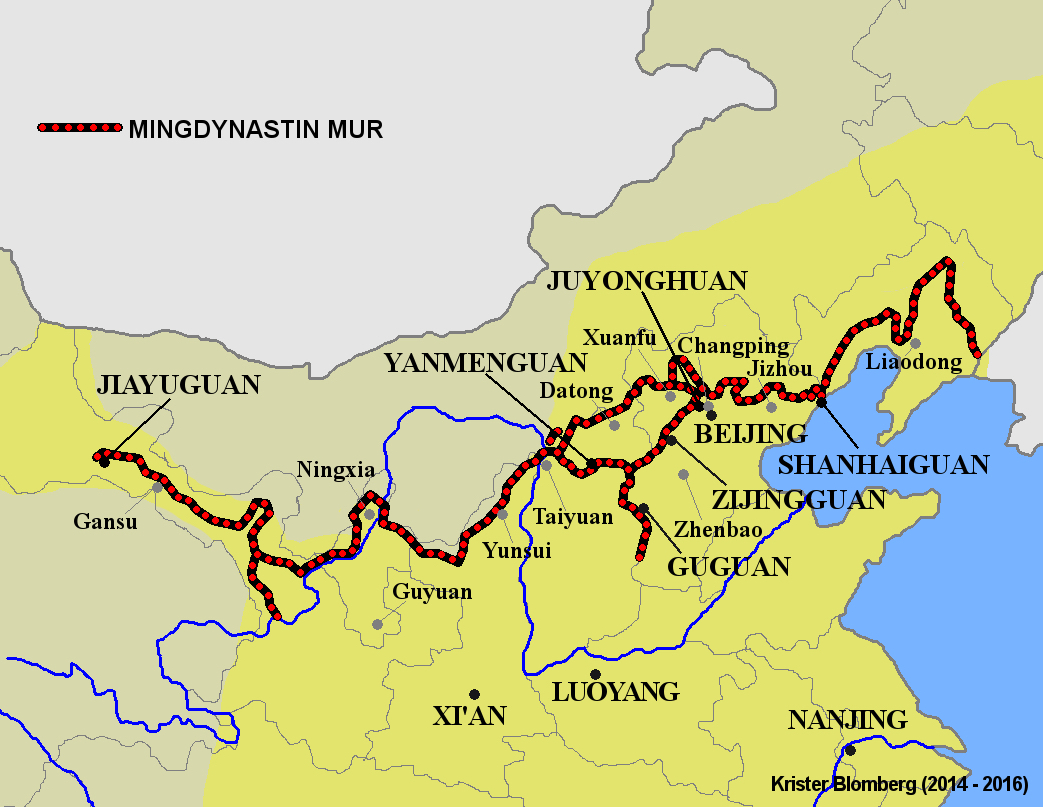
Map of the Nine Garrisons of the Ming dynasty. The gray dots on the map indicate the locations of the military garrisons, including Ningxia, the residence of the Prince of Anhua.

Zhu Zhifan was a member of China's Ming dynasty and a descendant of Zhu Zhan, Prince of Qing, who was also the sixteenth son of the Hongwu Emperor, the founder of the dynasty. In 1492, Zhu Zhifan inherited the title of Prince of Anhua. He resided in Ningxia, which was one of the border regional commanderies along the Ming Empire's border with Mongolia. Among the six commandery princes in Ningxia, he held a high rank and was one of the several hundred descendants of Zhu Zhan living in the region.

The imperial family in Ningxia was led by the Prince of Qing. The overall command of the region was held by a regional commander (a general), a grand defender (a eunuch), and a grand coordinator (a civil official). The latter two also supervised the members of the imperial family. This division of power and mutual supervision was put in place to prevent excessive independence within the region.

In 1507, eunuch Liu Jin rose to become the most influential figure in the Ming government. He implemented financial reforms with the goal of increasing state revenues. These reforms included strict collection of tax arrears and higher duties and levies for military households, and caused unrest in the northern borderlands of the Ming dynasty.

Zhu Zhifan saw himself as a suitable candidate for the imperial throne and shared this view among his confidants. He criticized Liu Jin among his confidants, but by 1510 his opposition had remained limited to words. His aides and confidants encouraged him to take more decisive action and flattered him with claims of his greatness and destiny for significant deeds. Most of the prince's confidants were officers from the Ningxia garrison. The prince's confidants were mostly officers from the Ningxia garrison. One of them was He Jin (何錦), who received a promotion to regional military commissioner by contributing 270 liang (10 kg) of silver to the state, which he borrowed from the prince. Another officer, Zhou Ang (周昂), also achieved the same rank through a similar contribution of 200 liang. The prince's inner circle also included members of the gentry, such as Sun Jingwen (孫景文), a student from a local Confucian school, and several former students. Additionally, the prince sought advice from shamans.

== Rebellion ==
In March 1510, government officials, including Vice Minister of the Court of Judicial Review Zhou Dong (大理少卿 周東), the eunuch Li Zeng (李增), and Grand Coordinator An Weixue (巡撫都御史 安惟學), arrived in Ningxia to review and potentially increase the tax obligations of military households, thereby provoking hostility among the affected officers and soldiers toward both one another and the government. He Jin and Sun Jingwen saw this as an opportunity to gain support for a revolt and successfully persuaded a number of officers to join their cause. The prince subsequently secured the support of another officer, including Xu Qin (徐欽), commander of the garrison at Pinglu, less than 70 km north of Ningxia.

On 12 May 1510, Zhu Zhifan invited the highest civil and military officials of the region—Li Zeng, Regional Commander Jiang Han (姜漢), and the eunuch Director of Firearms, Deng Guang (鄧廣)—to a banquet in his palace. At the banquet, they were killed by the prince's armed men. The rebels then occupied important official buildings in the city and killed Zhou Dong, An Weixue, Regional Military Commissioner Yang Zhong (楊忠), and other dignitaries. They also freed prisoners from the city prison. While some lower-ranking officials fled, the majority were intimidated into serving the prince from 13 May. Zhu Zhifan also called for obedience from the commanders of the surrounding garrisons, specifically Regional Vice Commander Yang Ying and Mobile Corps Commander Qiu Yue. Both faced a difficult decision as their families were in the city. Qiu Yue returned to the city on the same day, placed his troops under the command of Zhou Ang, He Jin, and Ding Guang (丁廣, another member of the prince's entourage) to gain the trust of the rebels, and then claimed to be ill and stayed home.

The prince seized the official treasury and collected large contributions from the members of the imperial family present. He also issued a proclamation, explaining the rebellion as an act of defense of the dynasty and the empire against the treacherous Liu Jin, and distributed it throughout the area. He bestowed lavish titles upon his aides, including He Jin, Zhou Ang, Ding Guang, and others. At the same time, he sought to maintain order in the city by executing several officers and soldiers for looting. The rebels also seized all available ships and anchored them in defensive formations along the harbor to prevent government troops from landing.

On 20 May, government troops, led by Regional Commander Cao Xiong (曹雄), began operations with a cavalry of over 2,400 soldiers to Lingzhou, which is separated from Ningxia by the Yellow River. Another detachment positioned itself on the opposite bank of the Yellow River, opposite the city of Ningxia, and blocked river transport. In Yansui, a large garrison in Shaanxi, the generals decided to concentrate 5,000 troops to suppress the rebellion. The following day, a select group from the detachment guarding the Yellow River crossed it and attacked a rebel unit guarding the port of Ningxia. They successfully captured 17 ships and weapons before returning to the Lingzhou bank. Qiu Yue then pretended to be sick and gathered a group of loyal officers. He also spread false reports through his officers to convince the prince and his confidants that they were in danger of being attacked by government troops. The prince dispersed most of his troops along the Yellow River and at the city's approaches, leaving only a small number of soldiers within the city itself.

On 30 May, Qiu Yue once again refused to meet with the prince, who then sent Zhou Ang to check on him. Qiu Yue killed Zhou Ang and, with a hundred men, attacked the prince's palace. He successfully took control of the palace and killed several dozen rebels, including Sun Jingwen. The prince was captured and the remaining rebels surrendered. Qiu Yue immediately announced the capture of the prince to both the loyalists (Cao Xiong) and the rebels in order to demoralize them. He Jin, Ding Guang, and several others attempted to flee to Mongolia but were captured by a patrol on 31 May. Xu Qin also died while trying to escape on the same day. Yang Jing's troops crossed the Yellow River and entered the city on the same day. Cao Xiong's troops also crossed the river on 1 June and fought their way through the city, eliminating the remaining rebels, with complete elimination of all rebel units in the area taking several more days.

== Ming government's response ==
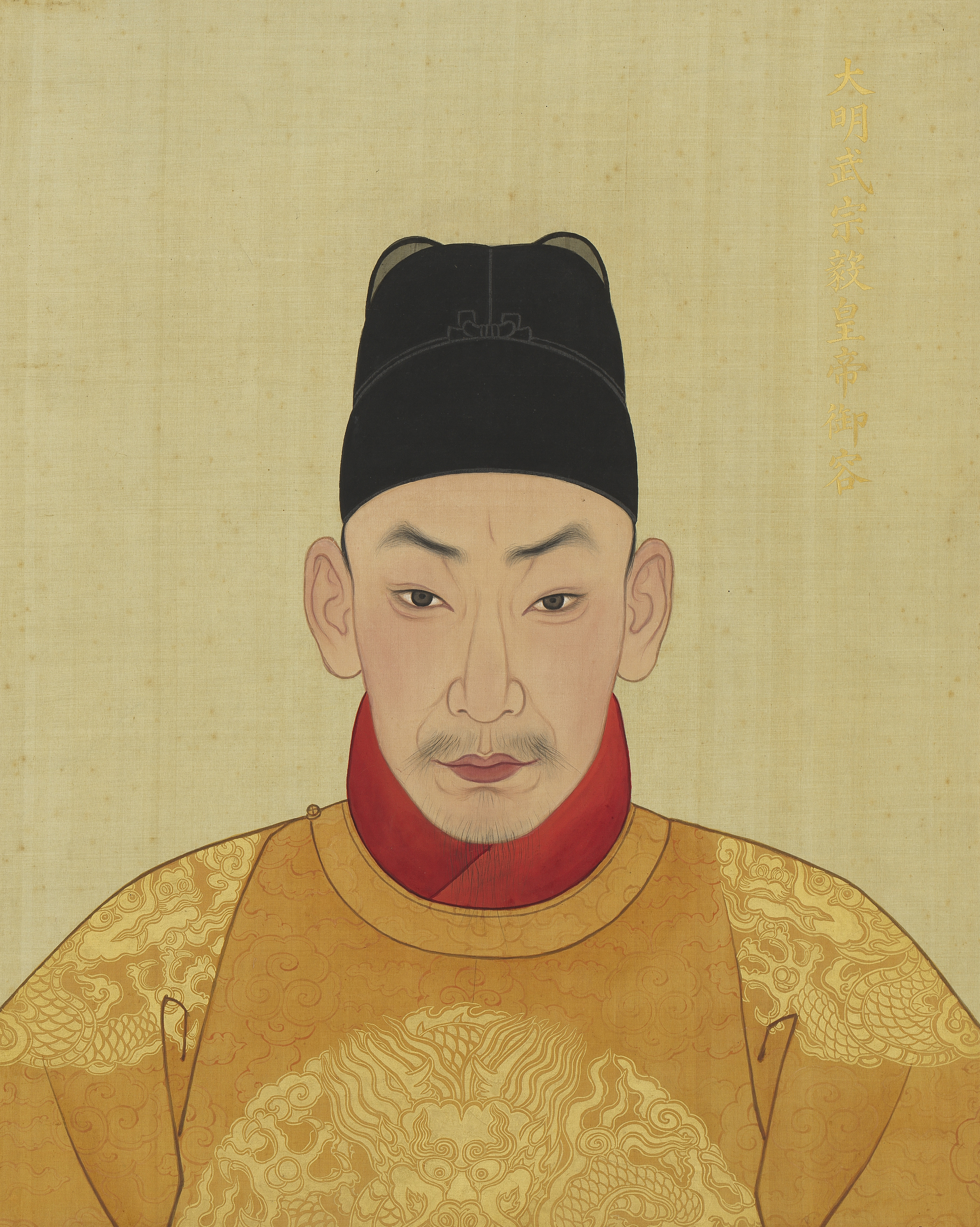
Portrait of the Zhengde Emperor. National Palace Museum, Taipei

After news of the rebellion reached Beijing, the Zhengde Emperor consulted with his grand secretaries and ministers and adopted a comprehensive set of measures. He dispatched Shen Ying (神英), Count of Jingyang (涇陽伯), and Yang Yiqing, Censor-in-chief, to lead the counter-rebellion. Both had extensive experience and success in the northwest frontier and in Ningxia itself. The government expected them to utilize their knowledge of the area and personal connections with local officers. Additionally, the Emperor promoted a number of Ningxia officers, including Qiu Yue. (Note: Qiu Yue's promotion to vice regional commander was pushed through by Grand Secretary Yang Tinghe despite the initial opposition of most Beijing officials involved in the matter. Two days later, news reached Beijing that Qiu Yue had joined the rebels. During a meeting of officials convened to discuss measures for suppressing the rebellion, several participants demanded that the promotion be revoked. Yang Tinghe, however, argued that Qiu Yue had likely only pretended to join the rebels in order to intervene more effectively against them, and that the government should avoid giving him a reason to genuinely defect. Moreover, Yang contended that even if Qiu Yue had truly betrayed the government, it was still preferable to confirm his promotion and thereby demonstrate that he still had an opportunity to return to the government's side. In either case, revoking the promotion would only worsen the situation. Influenced by Yang Tinghe's persuasive arguments, the assembled officials ultimately confirmed the promotion.) In order to isolate the rebels from the population, he authorized the printing of leaflets informing the people of Ningxia and the members of the imperial family residing there that the government would adopt a lenient policy toward those who had been compelled to join the rebellion.

He also allocated 300,000 liang (11.2 tons) of silver for the Ningxia soldiers, with each rebel soldier who returned to the government side receiving one liang (37.3 grams). On 2 June, he declared a broad amnesty for the rebels (except for those who committed the most serious crimes), abolished the new tax regulations for the military peasants in Ningxia, and forgave their tax debts. He also granted amnesty for minor crimes committed by princes throughout the empire. On 2 June, he appointed the eunuch Zhang Yong as the head of military affairs in Ningxia, sending him there with 30,000 men from the capital's garrison. This was the first time in the Ming dynasty that a eunuch had independent command of an army. Additionally, on the recommendation of Yang Yiqing, one million liang of silver were sent to Xuanfu, Datong, and Yansui to cover the costs of troop movements.

The government in Beijing received news of the prince's capture on 15 June through a report from Cao Xiong. Yang Yiqing, who was on his way to the scene, learned of the end of the rebellion and became concerned that the Beijing army, now no longer needed, would cause more harm than good. He urged for their recall, which was approved by the Emperor on 23 June. On 14 July, Yang Yiqing and Zhang Yong met in Lingzhou while on their way to Ningxia. They conducted a large-scale investigation into the rebellion, during which they arrested several hundred individuals. In order to calm the situation, they implemented various measures such as compensating the families of the victims (five liang of silver each) and the injured (three liang).

Zhang Yong escorted the captured rebels to Beijing, arriving on 13 September, when the prisoners were formally presented before the Zhengde Emperor and assembled military and civil officials at the Donghua Gate, located east of the Forbidden City. Out of the rebels, only a small number were executed, while 190 (including their family members) were sent to distant border garrisons. On 14 March 1511, after a long imprisonment, Zhu Zhifan—as a member of the imperial family—was permitted to commit suicide rather than face execution. All five of Zhu Zhifan's sons were imprisoned in Beijing, while his two younger brothers were expelled from the imperial clan for participating in the rebellion but were left at liberty. After an investigation, it was discovered that the Prince of Qing had neglected his duties as the head of the local clan, but remained loyal to Zhu Zhifan and even presented him with 10,000 liang of silver. Despite this, the Emperor initially maintained his favor with the Prince of Qing and gave him a considerable amount of gold and silver. (Note: 300 liang of gold and 5000 liang of silver. Each commandery prince from the Qing lineage received 50 to 200 liang of silver.) However, he later changed his mind and forced the Prince of Qing to return the gifts. Additionally, the Emperor abolished his personal guard and reduced his income, as well as the income of lower-ranking members of the imperial family from Ningxia.

For his key role in suppressing the rebellion, Qiu Yue was granted the title of Count of Xianning (咸寧). Another five hundred officers and soldiers involved in suppressing the rebellion received rewards in the form of promotions in rank, noble titles, money, and cloth, in addition to the one liang granted to each soldier in the region. Soldiers and military households in the region also had their obligations to the state reduced—specifically, the number of men that each household was required to provide for military service was lowered—and taxes were reduced as well.

During the campaign to Ningxia, Yang Yiqing persuaded Zhang Yong to oppose Liu Jin by warning him that Liu Jin was plotting a coup and that his life was therefore in danger. Zhang Yong joined forces with other eunuchs and successfully overthrew Liu Jin in September 1510, subsequently attaining a more influential position at the imperial court. He also promoted Yang Yiqing, who was appointed minister of revenue.

The Prince of Anhua uprising was one of two princedom rebellions during the Zhengde Emperor's reign, and preceded the Prince of Ning rebellion in 1519.
