= Yang Yiqing =

Chinese official (1454–1530)

- 楊一清
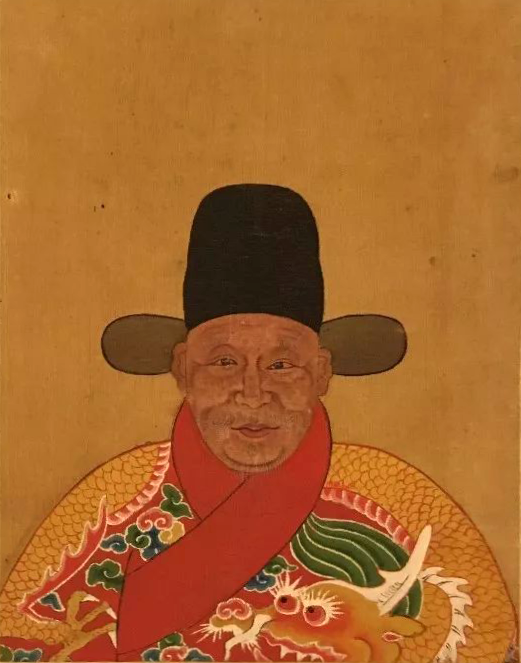

Senior Grand Secretary
- In office 1527–1529
- Monarch: Jiajing
- Preceded by: Fei Hong
- Succeeded by: Zhang Cong

Grand Secretary
- In office 1515–1516, 1526–1529
- Monarchs: Zhengde; Jiajing

Minister of Personnel
- In office 1511–1515
- Monarch: Zhengde
- Preceded by: Liu Ji
- Succeeded by: Lu Wan

Minister of Revenue
- In office 1510–1511
- Monarch: Zhengde
- Preceded by: Liu Ji
- Succeeded by: Sun Jiao

Personal details
- Born: 24 December 1454 Yunnan
- Died: 5 September 1530 (aged 75)
- Education: jinshi degree (1472)

Chinese name
- Traditional Chinese: 楊一清
- Simplified Chinese: 杨一清
Transcriptions
Standard Mandarin
- Hanyu Pinyin: Yáng Yīqīng

Yang Yiqing (Note: Yang Yiqing used the courtesy name Yingning (應寧) and the art name Sui'an (邃庵).) (24 December 1454 – 5 September 1530) was a Chinese scholar-official, military general, and writer during the Ming dynasty. He held influential positions during the reigns of the Zhengde and Jiajing emperors in the early 16th century, serving in the northwestern frontier province of Shaanxi and various central government offices. These included the positions of minister of revenue, minister of personnel, and grand secretary. In 1527–1529, he served as the head of the Grand Secretariat. He was also highly regarded as a poet during his lifetime.

== Early life ==
Yang Yiqing was born on 24 December 1454, during China's Ming dynasty, in Huazhou, Guangdong, where his father, Yang Jing (楊景), served as deputy county magistrate. His ancestors came from Anning in southwestern Yunnan Province. After retiring in 1460, Yang Jing moved with his family to Baling in Huguang. Yang Yiqing was an exceptionally gifted child and was educated in Confucian learning. In 1468, he passed the provincial civil service examinations, and in 1472, at the age of 18, he passed the metropolitan and palace examinations in Beijing and obtained the jinshi degree. In 1473, Yang Jing died and was buried in Dantu, Zhenjiang Prefecture, in Nanzhili (present-day Jiangsu), where his daughter resided, as Yunnan was too far away. Yang Yiqing subsequently settled in Dantu as well.

== Early career ==
In 1476, after completing his mourning period for his father, Yang returned to government service and was appointed as a secretary in the Grand Secretariat. After several years, he was transferred to the post of assistant commissioner of the provincial surveillance office in Shanxi, and in 1491 became the provincial education intendant of Shaanxi. He remained in Shaanxi for eight years, during which he established an academy in Xi'an and gained extensive knowledge of the province's defense organization against Mongol and Tibetan raids, as well as its state horse-breeding system.

In 1498, Yang served in Beijing as vice minister of the Court of Imperial Sacrifices. In 1501, he was promoted to minister of the Court of Imperial Sacrifices in Nanjing, but later that year, with the title of assistant surveillance commissioner, he took charge of horse breeding on the state pastures in Shaanxi. Following the devastating Mongol raids of 1501, the Chinese had lost their herds, and Yang rebuilt them from scratch, undertaking the task with great energy. He was additionally appointed grand coordinator (xunfu) of Shaanxi in January 1504 after renewed Mongol raids on the province.

== Under the Zhengde Emperor ==
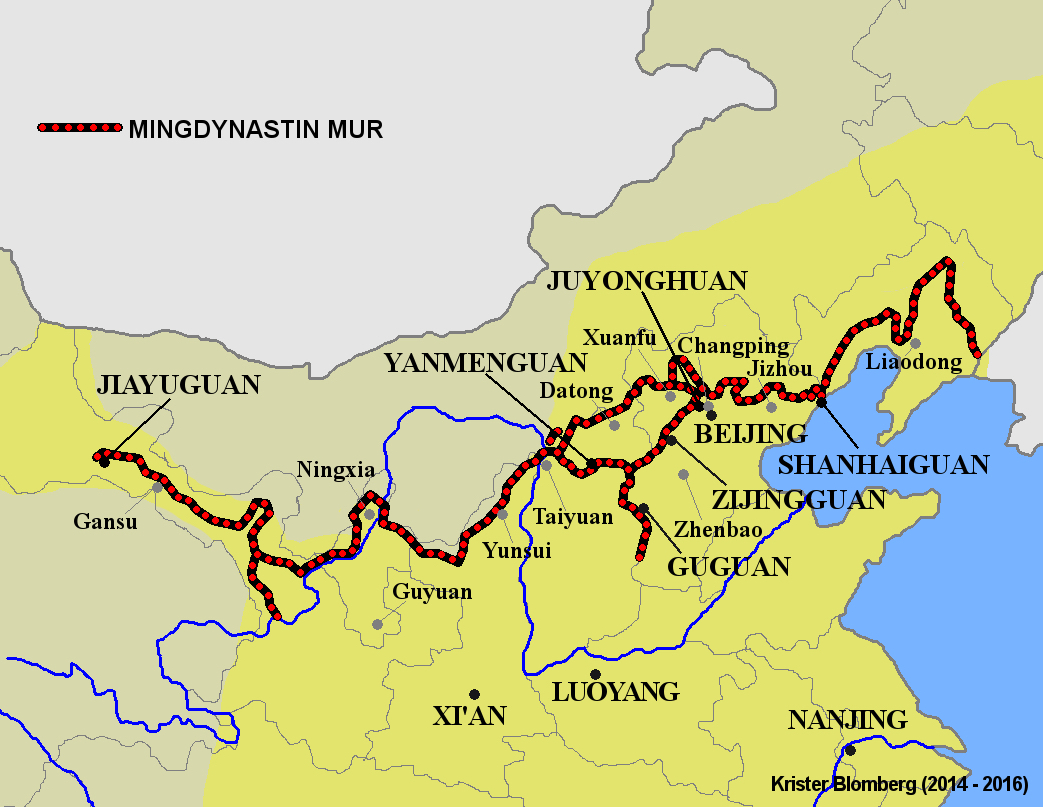
Map of the Ming Great Wall. Gray dots indicate the locations of military regions, including Gansu, Ningxia, and Yansui.

In 1505, Yang proposed reforming the state-controlled purchase of horses from Tibetan and Mongol tribes in exchange for tea, but the reform did not improve the situation. To make the defense administration in Shaanxi more effective, he proposed appointing a supreme commander (zongdu) to oversee the three military regions of Gansu, Ningxia, and Yansui. The Zhengde Emperor (r. 1505–1521) and the government approved the proposal, and on the recommendation of the Ministry of War, Yang was appointed supreme commander of Shaanxi in February 1506. As supreme commander, he submitted a plan to restore and extend the defensive walls in Ordos as part of a broader plan to reoccupy the region. The Emperor approved the plan and allocated funds, and Yang began construction. He built only 20 km of walls, however, before the powerful imperial eunuch Liu Jin accused him of embezzling the funds entrusted to him and had him arrested. Through the efforts of the grand secretaries Li Dongyang and Wang Ao, Yang was released in April 1507, but was forced to leave office. A decade later, when Minister of War Wang Qiong assessed the supreme commanders of Shaanxi, he considered Yang largely unsuccessful, as his reforms had failed to produce the expected results.

In May 1510, the Prince of Anhua rebellion broke out in Ningxia. As an experienced general and politician familiar with the problems and people of the northwest, Yang was recalled to government service, reappointed supreme commander of Shaanxi, and tasked with suppressing the rebellion alongside the eunuch Zhang Yong. They were given an army of several thousand troops drawn from garrisons around Beijing and along the northeastern frontier. To reinforce the army, Yang proposed rapid recruitment among bandits in the Beijing region. Before Yang and Zhang arrived, the rebellion had been suppressed by local commanders led by the general Qiu Yue. Yang subsequently organized an investigation into the events and restored order. During the campaign, Yang warned Zhang of the danger posed by Liu, who was plotting a coup. Zhang joined forces with other influential eunuchs, known as the "Eight Tigers", and overthrew Liu in September 1510.

In September 1510, with Zhang's support, the Emperor appointed Yang as the minister of revenue, before promoting him to minister of personnel in January 1511. He was honored with the prestigious title of Junior Tutor (少傅) in 1514. After Grand Secretary Yang Tinghe resigned in March 1515 to mourn his father's death, Liang Chu (梁儲) assumed leadership of the Grand Secretariat. Two months later, Yang Yiqing was appointed to the vacant position of grand secretary, while retaining the nominal title of minister of personnel.

As minister, Yang was involved in organizing the campaign against criminal gangs that expanded dramatically in 1510–1511. The gangs formed groups numbering several thousand and, in addition to plundering the countryside, began attacking county, subprefectural, and prefectural cities in Beizhili and Shandong, sometimes occupying them for weeks. Yang sharply criticized local officials who dealt with the attackers by appeasing, entertaining, bribing, or persuading them to plunder outside their jurisdictions. He proposed a comprehensive response, combining socioeconomic measures—such as prosecuting corrupt and incompetent officials, remitting taxes, and providing financial and material assistance to victims—with military measures, including fortifying cities with walls and villages with palisades, establishing checkpoints and patrol posts, preparing arsenals and food supplies, involving local figures—former officials, students of state schools, and wealthy residents—in organizing local militias, and recruiting brave and strong men, including those with criminal backgrounds, into the militias.

In 1516, invoking an extraordinary astronomical phenomenon and a flood as portents, Yang denounced the Emperor's favored individuals, but Zhang's loss of favor with the Emperor weakened Yang's support among the Emperor's entourage. This led to the commanders of the Imperial Guard, Jiang Bin and Qian Ning, taking offense to the criticism and subsequently having Yang dismissed in September 1516. Yang then returned to his hometown of Dantu. He did not meet the Zhengde Emperor again until September 1520, three years later. At the time, the Emperor was traveling through Dantu from Nanjing back to Beijing and stopped at Yang's residence for two days. Yang received the Emperor with great ceremony and, among other gifts, presented him with his own copies of the Song dynasty encyclopedia Cefu Yuangui and the Yuan dynasty encyclopedia Wenxian Tongkao.

== Under the Jiajing Emperor ==
In the spring of 1521, the Zhengde Emperor died. The new ruler, the Jiajing Emperor (r. 1521–1567), remembered that his father had ranked Yang Yiqing, Li Dongyang, and Liu Daxia (劉大夏) as the three most outstanding men in the middle and lower reaches of the Yangtze. He bestowed gifts upon Yang upon his accession. As the Emperor came into conflict with various officials during the Great Rites Controversy, Yang sided with the Emperor's chief supporter, the official Zhang Cong. He supported Zhang's pro-imperial arguments in a letter to Minister of Personnel Qiao Yu (喬宇), a former student of Yang and former vice minister of revenue. He also expressed his sympathy for the Emperor's position in correspondence directly with Zhang and other imperial supporters, including his protégé, Xi Shu. Yang's primary aim was to undermine the power of Grand Secretary Yang Tinghe and the scholars associated with the Hanlin Academy.

In January 1525, with the backing of Zhang Cong and Gui E, Yang resumed office as the supreme commander of the three military regions in Shaanxi. He received the formal titles of minister of war and censor-in-chief, making him the first former grand secretary in Ming China to hold a military command. In early 1525, Yang successfully repelled a raid by 10,000 horsemen from Qinghai.

In Beijing, Zhang and Gui sought to limit the influence of Senior Grand Secretary Fei Hong. In late 1525, Yang was summoned to Beijing. About six months later, with the support of Zhang and Gui, he was appointed grand secretary (and nominally minister of personnel). He was entrusted with the honorable task of completing the Veritable Records (Shilu) of the Jiajing Emperor's father, who had been posthumously honored as emperor. In March 1527, with the agreement of Zhang and Gui, he successfully obtained Fei Hong's resignation and succeeded him as senior grand secretary. Yang held this position until 1529. In September 1527, he received the high honorific title of Left Pillar of the State (左柱國).

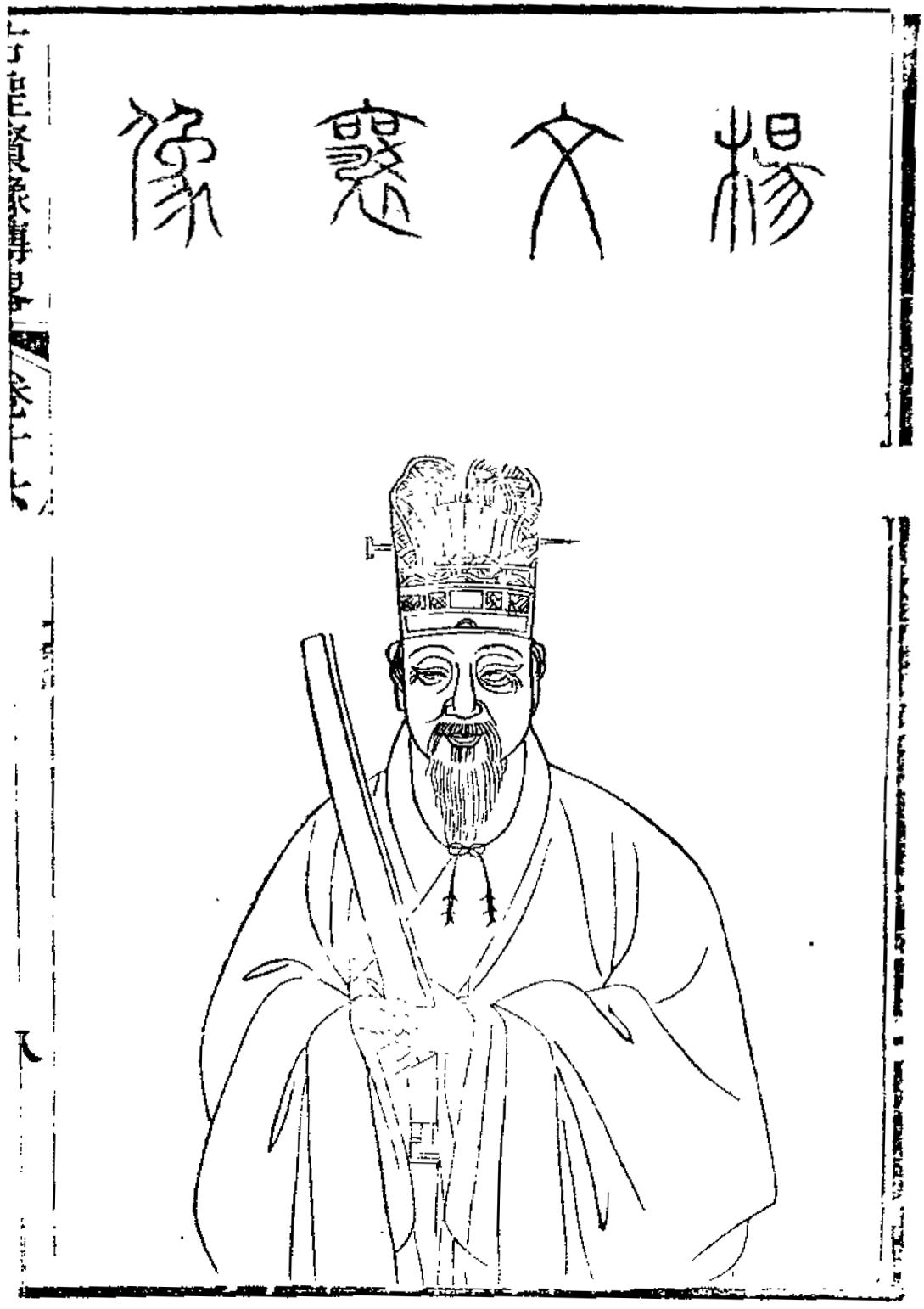
As depicted in the Gu shengxian xiang zhuan lüe, Volume 16.

As senior grand secretary, Yang recognized the issue of land ownership in the eight prefectures of the metropolitan area, where eunuch bureaus, imperial relatives, and powerful families had taken control of most of the land. He proposed an investigation into how these individuals had acquired the land and suggested solutions to address the problem. In late 1527, he successfully advocated for the return of Zhang Yong, who had been in exile for ten years. Zhang was then appointed as commander of the combined training divisions stationed around Beijing.

The Jiajing Emperor appointed Zhang Cong as grand secretary in October 1527, followed by Gui E in March 1529. The group of officials supporting the Emperor in the Great Rites Controversy had already lost unity, leading to the breakdown of cooperation between Yang Yiqing and the Zhang–Gui faction. In September 1529, the Emperor dismissed Zhang and Gui in response to accusations of abuse of power. As early as October 1529, Zhang's ally Huo Tao convinced the Emperor that the accusations against Zhang had resulted from Yang's behind-the-scenes machinations. The Emperor responded by restoring Zhang to office and dismissing Yang. Yang retired with honors, but Zhang Cong prompted censors to bring charges against Yang. These censors accused Yang of accepting bribes from Zhang Yong. In March 1530, Yang was stripped of his titles and ranks. He died six months later, on 6 September. In 1548, the Jiajing Emperor rehabilitated him and granted him the posthumous name Wenxiang (文襄) as a sign of special recognition.

== Assessment and literary works ==
Yang was a highly capable and educated man, particularly skilled in military and border affairs. He recognized and promoted numerous talented individuals, such as Jiu Yue, Wang Yangming, (Note: In the 1520s, however, he and Gui E opposed Wang Yangming. Despite recognizing Wang's abilities, Yang and Gui did not want him to overshadow them in Beijing. Wang was ultimately assigned to suppress a rebellion in distant Guizhou, while Gui sought to undermine his reputation during the campaign.) and Wang Tingxiang. His abilities were often compared to those of the renowned Tang statesman Yao Chong (651–721).

Yang Yiqing was one of the leading literary figures of his time. As a poet, he joined Li Dongyang in a movement seeking to overcome the courtly cabinet style of poetry (Note: Cabinet style (taige ti) was a form of poetry that emerged in Ming China in the early 15th century, during the reign of the Yongle Emperor (1402–1424). It was dominated by scholar-officials serving in the central government, whose works praised Confucian values and the emperor while celebrating the prosperity of the state through virtuous and orderly government.) through stronger personal expression. Li Mengyang, a leading figure of the following generation of poets, known as the Earlier Seven Masters, regarded himself as a disciple of Yang Yiqing (as well as of Li Dongyang) and maintained close ties with him. Li edited and provided commentary on Yang Yiqing's poetry collection Shicong shigao (石琮詩稿) and prose collection Shicong wengao (石琮文稿). Several other collections of Yang Yiqing's memorials, letters, recollections, and essays have also survived. These include Xizheng rilu (西征日錄), an account of his travels through the border regions of Shaanxi, Ningxia, and Gansu and the military campaigns against the Mongols in these areas; Zhifu zalu (制府雜錄), a collection of miscellaneous notes from his tenure in Shaanxi; and Guanzhong zouyi quanji (關中奏議全集), a collection of memorials and official submissions sent to the emperor and the government during his service in Shaanxi.
