= Eastern Depot =

Ming dynasty secret police agency

- 東廠

Agency overview
- Formed: 1420
- Dissolved: 1644

Eastern Depot or Eastern Bureau (traditional Chinese: 東廠; simplified Chinese: 东厂; pinyin: Dōng Chǎng; Wade–Giles: Tung Ch'ang) was a Ming dynasty spy and secret police agency run by eunuchs. It was created by the Yongle Emperor.

== History ==
After the Yongle Emperor usurped the throne in 1402 from his nephew, the Jianwen Emperor, he attempted to retain the officials who served in Jianwen's court, but some of them opposed him. In 1420, in order to suppress political opposition, Yongle decided to create the Eastern Depot (named as such because it was located east of the imperial palace), a spy and secret police agency run by eunuchs. They were responsible for spying on officials of any rank, including military officers, scholars, rebels, and the general populace. The Eastern Depot would investigate and arrest suspects and then hand them over to the Jinyiwei for interrogation. In the late Ming dynasty, the Eastern Depot had its own tactical forces and prisons, and became so powerful that even officials were ordered to kowtow to the Depot's leaders. The Eastern Depot lasted to 1644, the end of the Ming Dynasty.

There was also a government department called the Western Depot (Xichang) established by the Chenghua Emperor in 1477, originally to search for supernatural usurpers, but became a rival to the Eastern Depot. It was in operation until 1510, except for an interval from 1482 to 1506. A third security apparatus, created to counter the two depots and the Jinyiwei, was called the Inner Branch Depot (Neixingchang) and lasted from about 1505 (during Zhengde Emperor's reign) until 1510 as well. The Inner Branch Depot was briefly re-established sometime during the long reign of the Wanli Emperor.

== Famous chiefs of the Eastern Depot ==
- Wang Zhen
- Liu Jin
- Feng Bao
- Wei Zhongxian

== See also ==
- Transitional Justice Commission#Eastern Depot scandal
