= Zhu Zhifan =

Chinese prince and rebel (died 1511)

Zhu Zhifan 朱寘鐇
- Prince of Anhua
- Died: 14 March 1511
- Spouse: Lady Shi
- Issue: Zhu Taijin
- House: Zhu
- Father: Zhu Suiman

Chinese name
- Traditional Chinese: 朱寘鐇
- Simplified Chinese: 朱寘𫔍
Transcriptions
Standard Mandarin
- Hanyu Pinyin: Zhū Zhìfán

Zhu Zhifan (died 14 March 1511) was a prince of the Ming dynasty of China, belonging to a minor branch of the Zhu Zhan family. Zhu Zhan was the sixteenth son of the Hongwu Emperor, the founding emperor of the dynasty. In 1492, he inherited the title of Prince of Anhua and was based in Ningxia, the center of one of the frontier regional headquarters along the border of the Ming dynasty with Mongolia. In May 1510, he took advantage of the dissatisfaction of the officers and soldiers of the garrison there with the consistent collection of taxes and rebelled. He justified the rebellion by attempting to remove the eunuch Liu Jin, who was the de facto head of the Ming government at the time. The rebellion only lasted a few weeks and collapsed in late May 1510 when Qiu Yue, a loyalist who had apparently joined the rebels, captured Zhu Zhifan. Government troops then took control of the city of Ningxia. The rebels were punished according to their level of guilt, and the Zhengde Emperor allowed Zhu Zhifan to commit suicide.

== Background and early life ==
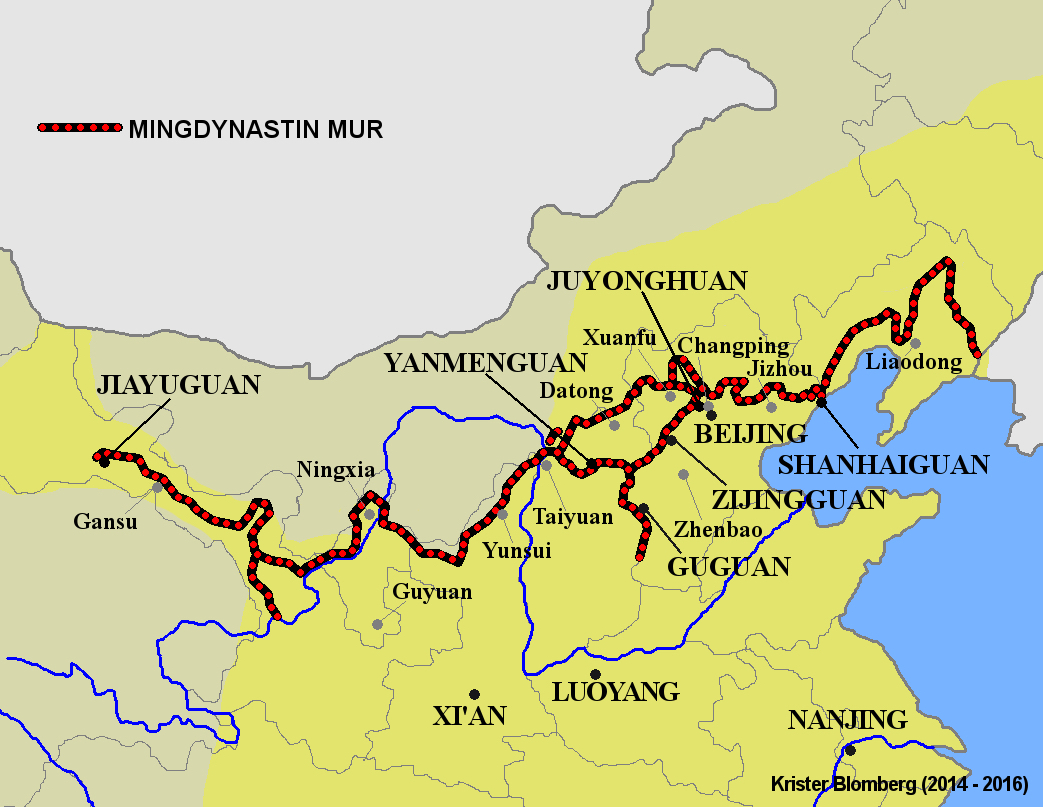
Map of the Nine Garrisons of the Ming dynasty. The gray dots on the map indicate the locations of the military garrisons, including Ningxia, the residence of the Prince of Anhua.

Zhu Zhifan was one of the many princes of China's Ming dynasty, descended from a minor branch of the Ming princely line. His grandfather, Zhu Zhitong (朱秩炵), was the fourth son of Zhu Zhan, Prince of Qing, who was the sixteenth son of the Hongwu Emperor. Zhu Zhan's fief was moved to Ningxia, an important border fortress city and the seat of one of the regional military headquarters on the Ming-Mongol border, in 1402, and the Qing lineage remained there until the end of the dynasty. In 1421, Zhu Zhitong was granted the title Prince of Anhua (安化郡王). Zhu Zhifan's father, Zhu Suiman, the eldest son of Zhu Zhitong, was granted the title of Defender-General of the State (Zhenguo jiangjun) in 1451. He died in 1464 and was later posthumously granted the title of prince by Zhu Zhifan, with the posthumous name "Gonghe". Zhu Zhifan had two younger brothers, Zhu Zhikong (朱寘錓) and Zhu Zhiwu (朱寘鎢).

Following the death of his grandfather in 1491, Zhu Zhifan succeeded him as the Prince of Anhua the following year. As the commandery prince (郡王), he was guaranteed an annual income of 1,000 shi (107,000 liters) of grain from the state, half of which was paid in kind (in grain) and the other half in silver.

Zhu Zhifan saw himself as destined for great deeds and surrounded himself with a group of loyal followers, including officers from the Ningxia garrison and members of the local gentry. Some of his closest confidants were officers He Jin (何錦) and Zhou Ang (周昂), who both achieved promotion to regional military commissioner with the help of state grants of 270 liang (10 kg) and 200 liang of silver respectively, borrowed from the prince. The prince's inner circle also included several former students of the local Confucian school, including Sun Jingwen (孫景文).

== Rebellion ==
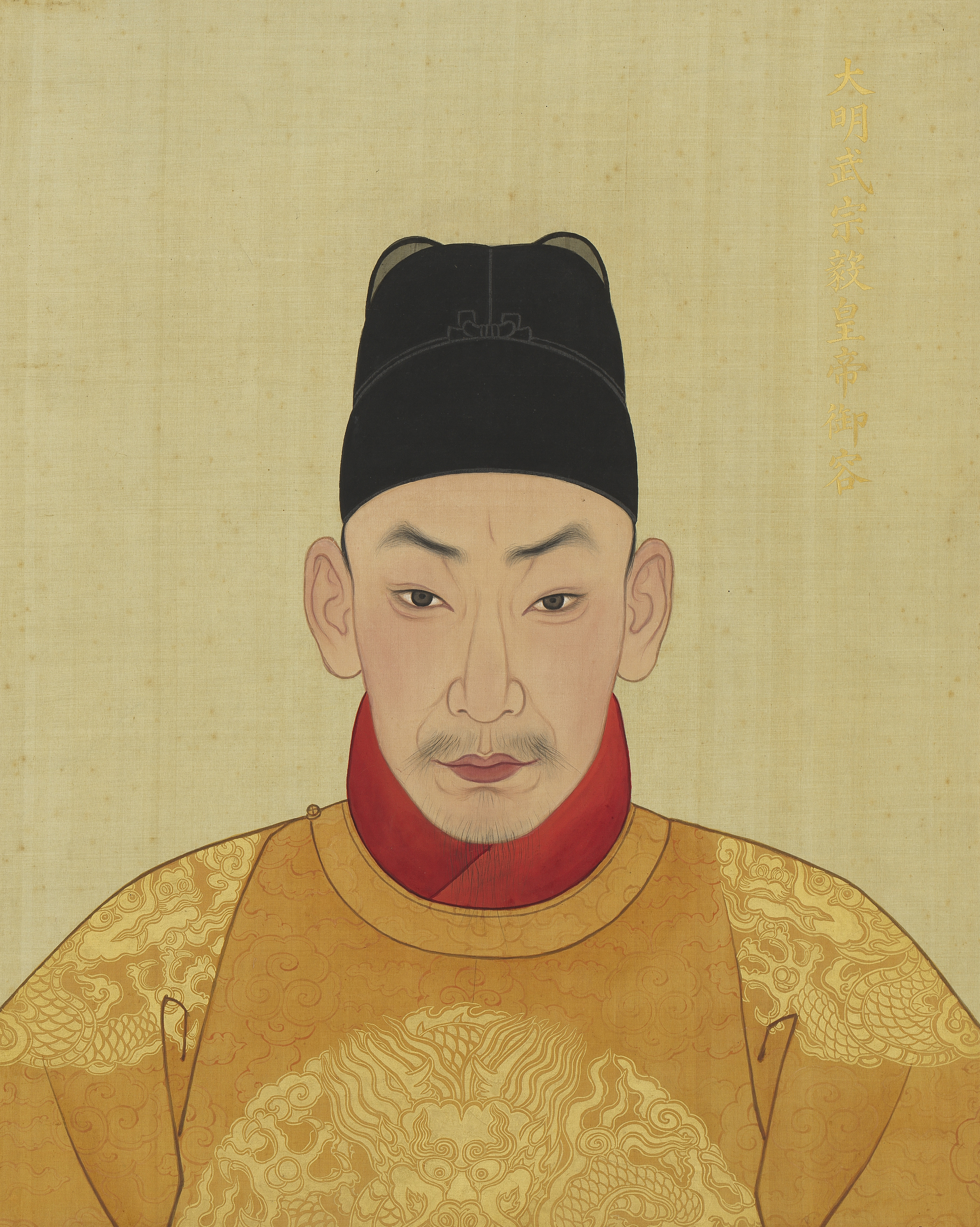
Portrait of the Zhengde Emperor. National Palace Museum, Taipei

Zhu Zhifan's ambitions were thwarted until 1510 when Liu Jin, a eunuch who held significant power in the government thanks to the trust and support of the Zhengde Emperor, sent an envoy to Shaanxi. The envoy's purpose was to implement tax increases for soldier-peasants and punish tax debtors, which sparked anger and discontent among the people. Taking advantage of the situation, the prince declared a campaign against Liu and the rebellion on 12 May. The surrounding military commanders did not join in and instead reported the rebellion to the government in Beijing. In response, an army led by official Yang Yiqing and eunuch Zhang Yong was sent to suppress the rebellion. Before the army reached Shaanxi, loyalists led by garrison officer Qiu Yue (仇鉞) captured the prince on 30 May. During the campaign, Yang convinced Zhang to turn against Liu, warning him of the danger posed by Liu's plans for a coup. With the help of other eunuchs, Zhang successfully overthrew Liu in September 1510.

After the imperial troops captured the rebels, Zhang brought them to Beijing, where nearly a hundred of them were executed. Another 190, including their family members, were sent to distant border garrisons. On 14 March 1511, after a long captivity, Zhu Zhifan—being a member of the imperial family—was permitted to commit suicide rather than face execution.

Zhu Zhifan House of Zhu Died: 14 March 1511
Chinese royalty
Vacant Title last held by Zhu Zhitong	Prince of Anhua; 1492–1510	Title abolished
