= Liu Jin =

Chinese eunuch (1451–1510)

- 劉瑾
- Born: Tan Jin (談瑾); 1451; Xingping, Shaanxi
- Died: 1510 (aged 58–59); Beijing
- Occupation: Eunuch

Chinese name
- Traditional Chinese: 劉瑾
- Simplified Chinese: 刘瑾
Transcriptions
Standard Mandarin
- Hanyu Pinyin: Liú Jǐn

Liu Jin (1451–1510) was a Chinese eunuch of the Ming dynasty who held significant power in the government of the Zhengde Emperor from 1506 to 1510. He was part of a group of eunuchs known as the "Eight Tigers" who had been in the service of the Zhengde Emperor since his childhood. Upon the Emperor's ascension to the throne in 1505, the Tigers were promoted, and Liu emerged as the dominant figure in the government. He implemented a series of reforms aimed at increasing state revenues, which also led to a rise in the influence of eunuchs at the expense of scholar-officials. These reforms sparked unrest and opposition throughout the empire. In 1510, Liu's former allies accused him of treason and he was executed.

== Origin and rise to power ==
Liu Jin was born in 1451 in Xingping County, Shaanxi, during China's Ming dynasty. Originally surnamed Tan (談), he was castrated as a young boy and adopted by a eunuch surnamed Liu serving in the Forbidden City. He was known for his intelligence and eloquence. In the 1480s, Liu served as a guardian at the Ming tombs near Beijing. On the recommendation of the influential eunuch Li Guang in 1492, he became one of the attendants responsible for caring for Zhu Houzhao, the Hongzhi Emperor's young son and newly designated heir apparent. In 1505, the Hongzhi Emperor died, and Zhu Houzhao ascended to the throne as the Zhengde Emperor. The Emperor favored the eunuchs, particularly a group known as the "Eight Tigers", which included Liu, over scholar-officials.

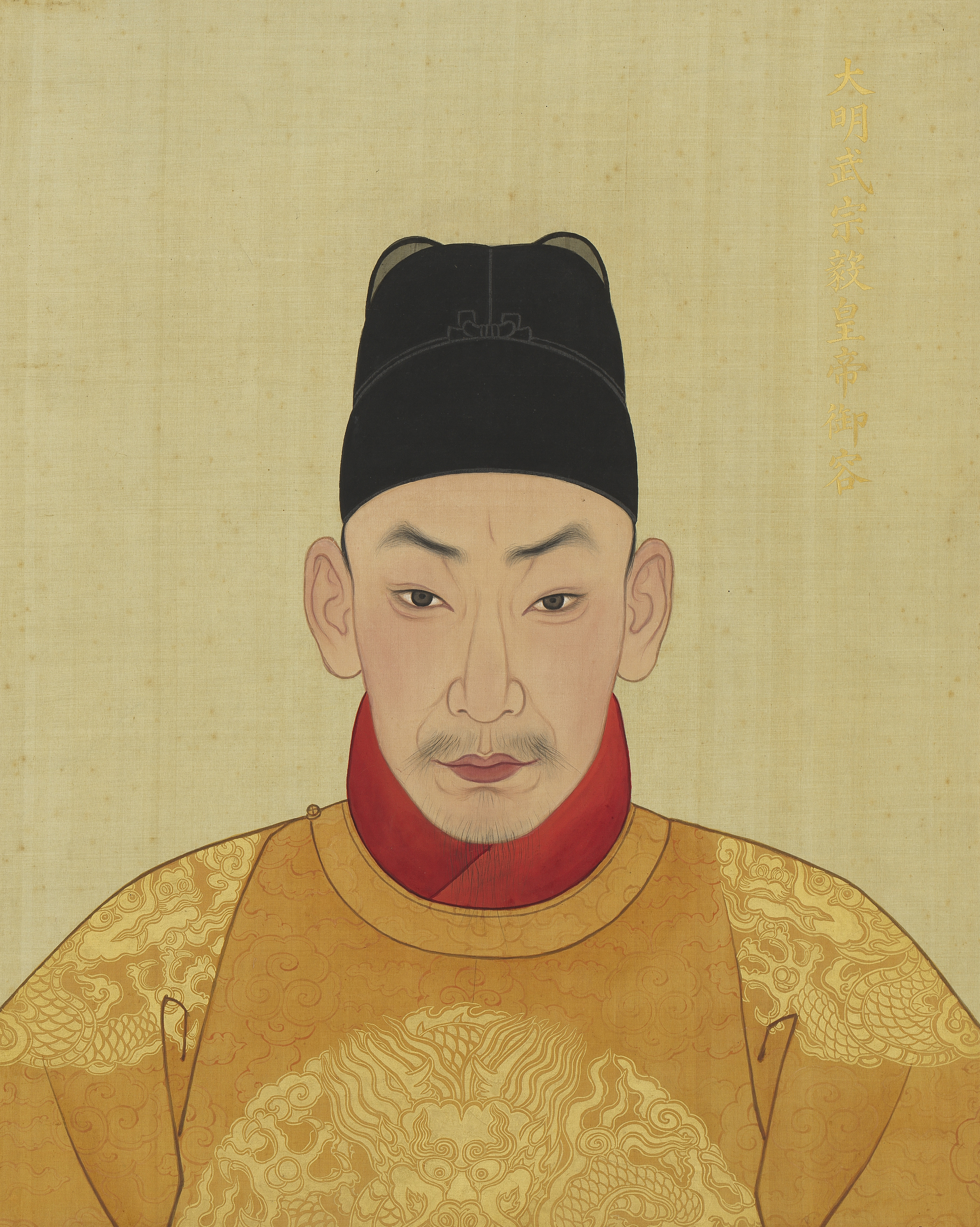
Portrait of the Zhengde Emperor. National Palace Museum, Taipei

After the Zhengde Emperor ascended to the throne, Liu was appointed to oversee the Bells and Drums Office (鐘鼓司; Zhonggusi), a palace agency responsible for ceremonial music and performances. He also gained military authority as a commander of the Beijing garrison, where he managed firearms training and operations—first in the "Division of Five Thousand" (五千營; Wuqianying) and later in the elite "integrated division" (團營; tuanying). He convinced the Emperor that the decline in revenues was due to the incompetence and corruption of the officials responsible for finance. He suggested that they be checked and punished if found to be corrupt. The eunuchs of the Eastern Depot (the Ming secret police) were uncompromising in their demand for officials to fulfill their duties. For example, in 1505, they discovered that only 25,000 skeins of silk had been collected for taxes in and around Suzhou, instead of the prescribed 300,000. As a result, they ordered the Ministry of Revenue to arrange for the delivery of 50,000 skeins of owed silk every 10 days. Officials who did not comply with this command would be sent to prison.

In 1506, a group of high officials, led by the grand secretaries Liu Jian (劉健) and Xie Qian (謝遷), formed an alliance with high-ranking eunuchs, including Wang Yue (王岳), the director of the East Wing. This alliance was formed due to the fear of the Tigers rising in power. They agreed on a petition to have Liu executed, although some of the eunuchs involved only wanted him to be transferred to the south. On 27 October, Minister of Revenue Han Wen (韓文) presented a petition to the Emperor, requesting the execution of all eight individuals involved. Although the Emperor refused the execution, he agreed to some form of punishment. Minister of Personnel Jiao Fang (焦芳) informed Liu of the action against him, and the Eight were able to reach the Emperor at the last minute. They convinced him that their critics had conspired to gain unchecked power. This enraged the Emperor, who immediately promoted the Tigers to positions of power. Liu became head of the Directorate of Ceremonial, and the eunuch allies of the Liu–Xie group were transferred to Nanjing, where they were killed on the way south. At the morning audience on 28 October, it was announced that the Emperor had already made a decision regarding the eight individuals. The grand secretaries, except for Li Dongyang, responded by resigning. Four days later, Jiao Fang was appointed Grand Secretary. Other allies of the Eight were also secured positions within the Grand Secretariat. From October 1506 to September 1510, the eunuch-official alliance, led by Liu, dominated the court. Liu himself was not well-educated, so he relied on capable ministers, such as Minister of Personnel Zhang Chai (張綵), to manage the country's administration. Among his allies were Grand Secretary Liu Yu (劉宇), Minister of War Cao Yuanjin (曹元錦), and the commanders of the Embroidered Uniform Guard, Yang Yu (楊玉) and Shi Wenyi (石文義).

== Reforms ==
As head of the Directorate of Ceremonial, the most influential eunuch office, Liu's focus was on increasing the emperor's income, and he did so by implementing various tactics. For example, his agents would impose additional silver levies on mines in Fujian and Sichuan. They also engaged in salt monopoly by selling beyond official quotas, which often resulted in their own imprisonment when caught by officials. Liu's ultimate goal was for the profits from salt sales to become the second largest source of state revenue, following the land tax. To achieve this, he employed a secret police force led by eunuchs to track down and capture salt smugglers across the country. He also used fear and intimidation to ensure that officials responsible for finance and taxes met their quotas, threatening them with heavy fines if they failed to do so. This often left these officials in a state of financial hardship. Liu enforced the obedience of scholar-officials through brutal terror, but also struggled with the aversion of the other seven Tigers, themselves powerful figures in the government.

In March 1507, a decree was issued that placed eunuch intendants in the provinces on equal footing with leading provincial officials, giving them authority over administrative and legal matters. This increase in power for eunuchs sparked strong opposition from officials. While Liu managed state affairs, the Emperor indulged in pleasure. During one of his entertainments, Liu presented him with state documents to sign, but the Emperor dismissed him, saying he was only employing him to avoid the tedious task of reading and signing decrees. After that, Liu no longer bothered the Emperor with state documents.

Liu Jin also introduced changes to the examination system. Under the existing regulations, the provincial examinations were held every three years, followed by the metropolitan and palace examinations in the spring of the following year. The number of successful candidates in each provincial examination was fixed by the central government, with each province allotted several dozen places. The metropolitan examination likewise had a fixed quota, set at 350 candidates in 1478. From the mid-15th century, the successful candidates had also been divided by region: 55 percent from the southern provinces, 35 percent from the northern provinces, and 10 percent from the central region, which comprised southwestern China. Liu increased the quotas for successful candidates in the northern provinces. In Shaanxi, the quota rose from 65 to 100, while those for Shandong, Shanxi, and Henan increased from 75, 65, and 80 to 90, 90, and 95, respectively. For the metropolitan examination, he abolished the central regional category and established an equal 50:50 quota between candidates from the north and south. The reform apparently aimed to strengthen the position of candidates from northern China, particularly those from Liu's native Shaanxi. It was applied to the examinations of 1508 but repealed in 1510. Northern officials who passed the examinations in 1508 were criticized as "Liu Jin's faction".

A reform of military financing on the northern frontier in 1508–1509 abolished extraordinary subsidies from the Emperor's personal funds and replaced them with higher taxes on the landholdings of military households. The change caused widespread discontent along the frontier, contributing in 1509 to mutinies at two garrisons in Liaodong and increased banditry in the northern metropolitan area. In 1510, another rebellion broke out and spread across the area from Beijing to the Yangtze River. In Shaanxi, discontent among soldiers and officers also helped create the conditions for the Prince of Anhua rebellion.

== Downfall ==
In May 1510, Zhu Zhifan, Prince of Anhua, led a rebellion in Shaanxi, taking advantage of the opposition to Liu's reforms. In response, the Emperor sent one of the Eight Tigers, Zhang Yong, to lead the army against the rebels. Additionally, Yang Yiqing, an official familiar with local affairs, was also sent to Shaanxi. However, the rebellion was crushed by local forces before they even arrived. During the march, Yang convinced Zhang that he was in danger of being overthrown by Liu in a palace coup.

After returning to Beijing, Zhang joined forces with the other six Tigers. On 13 September 1510, they accused Liu of treason, claiming he planned to assassinate the Emperor and place his own great-nephew on the throne during the funeral of Liu's recently deceased brother, scheduled for 17 September. Despite the Emperor's initial reluctance to believe in Liu's betrayal, he was finally convinced. The next day, Liu was transferred to Nanjing and his property was confiscated. The Emperor ordered Liu's execution upon seeing the weapons and vast treasures that he had accumulated, despite Liu's claims of innocence. On 16 September, Liu was arrested, and his three-day execution by lingchi, or "slow slicing", began on 27 September.

Historians have varying accounts of the size of Liu's treasure. For example, Goodrich reports that it consisted of 300,000 liang of gold, 50 million liang of silver, and 20 bushels of precious stones. Meanwhile, Barmé claims that the treasure included 2.5 million liang of gold and silver, two gold suits of armor, 25 pounds of precious stones, 3,000 gold rings and brooches, 500 gold plates, and over 4,000 jeweled belts. Eberhard's account differs even more, stating that the treasure contained 57,800 pieces of gold, 240,000 gold bars (each ten times heavier than a liang), 791,800 liang of silver, 5 million silver bars (each weighing five liang), 3 bushels of precious stones, two gold armors, and 3,000 gold rings, among other items. One liang was equivalent to 37.301 grams, meaning that 1 million liang would weigh approximately 37.3 tons.

Liu's allies were removed, and his reforms were reversed. The reform documents were also destroyed, resulting in the failure of the only substantial attempt to change the administrative structure of the Ming dynasty and expand the emperor's direct control through eunuch officials.

While classical historians harshly criticize Liu's group, they did attempt to streamline the administration of the empire and prevent the decline of central authority. Despite amassing enormous personal wealth, Liu claimed to aim to prevent officials from serving their personal interests, anticipating similar efforts by Zhang Juzheng about seventy years later. However, the fact that these reforms were initiated by eunuchs sufficed for their rejection by the conservative bureaucracy.
