= Fei Hong =

Chinese official (1468–1535)

- 費宏
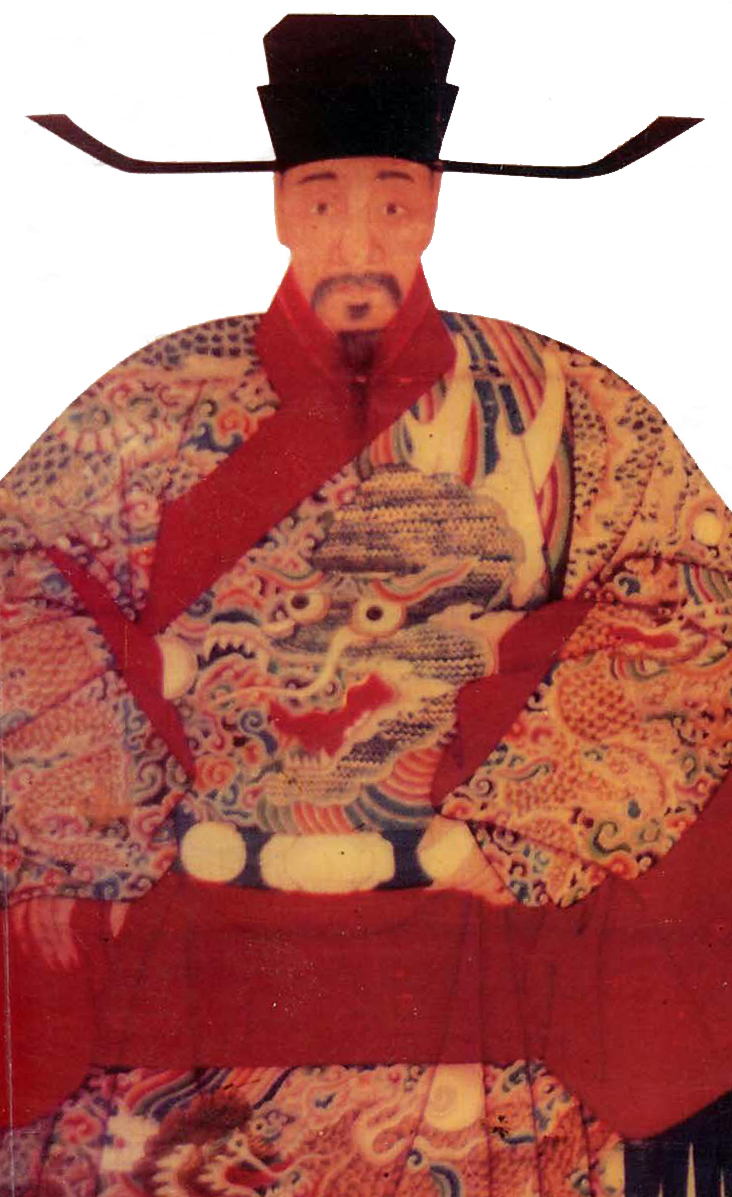

Senior Grand Secretary
- In office 1524–1527
- Monarch: Jiajing
- Preceded by: Mao Ji
- Succeeded by: Yang Yiqing

Grand Secretary
- In office 1511–1514, 1521–1527, 1535
- Monarchs: Zhengde; Jiajing

Personal details
- Born: 20 March 1468 Yanshan, Jiangxi
- Died: 15 November 1535 (aged 67)
- Education: jinshi degree (1487)

Chinese name
- Traditional Chinese: 費宏
- Simplified Chinese: 费宏
Transcriptions
Standard Mandarin
- Hanyu Pinyin: Fèi Hóng

Fei Hong (Note: Fei Hong used the courtesy name Zichong (子充) and the art names Jianzhai (健齋), Ehu (鵝湖), and Hudong yelao (湖東野老). He was given the posthumous name Wenxian (文憲).) (20 March 1468 – 15 November 1535) was a Chinese scholar-official during the Ming dynasty. He served in high-ranking positions in the central government during the reigns of the Zhengde and Jiajing emperors in the early 16th century, including grand secretary and head of the Grand Secretariat from 1524 to 1527.

== Early life ==
Fei Hong was born on 20 March 1468 in Yanshan, in northeastern Jiangxi Province, during China's Ming dynasty. He received a Confucian education and, at the age of 15, passed the provincial civil service examinations in 1483. The following spring, he failed the metropolitan examination and therefore remained in Beijing to study at the Imperial University.

In the 1487 metropolitan examination, Fei ranked 16th overall. He excelled in the subsequent palace examination, where he was placed first among all candidates. Having passed the examination at the age of 19, he also became the youngest recipient of the zhuangyuan degree—the highest honor in the palace examination—during the entire three-century history of the Ming dynasty.

== Early career ==
After the examinations, Fei began his official career as a compiler in the Hanlin Academy. He participated in the compilation of the Veritable Records of Emperor Xianzong, the official chronicle of the Chenghua Emperor's reign (1464–1487). Before the project was completed, he fell ill and returned home. He remained there until 1495, when he was appointed director of instruction of the heir apparent. Soon afterward, both of his parents died in succession. He again suspended his official duties to observe the prescribed mourning period and remained at home until 1503, when he resumed his service in the Hanlin Academy. In 1507, he was appointed junior vice minister of rites. Three years later, he was promoted to minister of rites, although he served in that post only briefly before being appointed a grand secretary in 1511.

== Grand Secretary ==
Upon his appointment as grand secretary, Fei was also granted the honorary title of grand guardian of the heir apparent and concurrently held the nominal post of minister of revenue. At the time, the Grand Secretariat also included Li Dongyang, Yang Tinghe, and Liang Chu. During his tenure, Fei incurred the hostility of several favorites of the Zhengde Emperor (r. 1505–1521), including Qian Ning. These favorites coerced him to resign in May 1514, and he returned to his native Jiangxi Province.

Even after returning to Jiangxi, Fei continued to face difficulties. As grand secretary, he had opposed several proposals, including a request by Zhu Chenhao, Prince of Ning, who was based in Nanchang, the provincial capital of Jiangxi, to establish a princely guard. Fei commented that if the prince maintained his own forces, not a single living creature would remain in Jiangxi. The prince consequently became hostile toward Fei, launching armed attacks against his home and property, burning down his residence, and damaging the family cemetery. The Ming government had tasked the grand coordinator Wang Yangming with suppressing banditry in southern Jiangxi, and when the Prince of Ning's rebellion broke out in the summer of 1519, Wang quickly raised an army, captured Nanchang, defeated the prince's forces, and brought the rebellion to an end. During the rebellion, Fei maintained written correspondence with Wang and provided him with several useful suggestions.

Following the accession of the Jiajing Emperor in May 1521, Fei was promptly recalled to government service through the influence of Senior Grand Secretary Yang Tinghe. Fei delayed his journey to Beijing and did not arrive until November 1521, after repeated summonses, when he resumed his post as grand secretary. Under Yang's leadership, Fei, Jiang Mian, and Mao Ji served together in the Grand Secretariat until the spring of 1524.

During the Great Rites Controversy between the Jiajing Emperor and most officials, Fei supported Yang Tinghe, the Emperor's leading opponent, and co-signed collective memorials opposing the Emperor's views. However, he never submitted a separate memorial directly criticizing the Emperor's position on the controversy, and he showed a greater degree of understanding and sympathy toward the Emperor's stance than most other senior officials. This earned him the Emperor's trust and support. After the grand secretaries Yang, Jiang, and Mao resigned in 1524, Fei become the senior grand secretary, with Shi Bao (石珤) and Jia Yong (賈詠) joining the Grand Secretariat.

Because of the Emperor's favor toward him, Fei aroused the jealousy of the Emperor's more ardent supporters, particularly Gui E and Zhang Cong. In 1526, Gui and Zhang arranged for the return of Yang Yiqing to the Grand Secretariat in an effort to limit Fei's influence. Yang had previously served as grand secretary in 1515–1516. He joined Fei's critics and they succeeded in securing Fei's dismissal in March 1527.

== Later life ==
In May 1535, Senior Grand Secretary Zhang Cong resigned due to illness, and Li Shi (李時) succeeded him. On Li's recommendation, the Emperor recalled Fei to the Grand Secretariat. After eight years out of office, Fei traveled to Beijing to resume his service. He died on 15 November 1535, only two months after his return. He was granted the posthumous name Wenxian (文憲).

Fei Hong's eldest son, Fei Mouxian (費懋賢), passed the metropolitan and palace examinations in 1526. His official career culminated in his appointment as a bureau director at the Ministry of War. Fei Hong's cousin Fei Cai (費寀; 1483–1549) was also a successful official. He passed the metropolitan and palace examinations in 1511 and eventually rose to become minister of rites.
