= Battle of Yingzhou =

1517 conflict between the Ming dynasty and the Mongols

Date	16 – 21 October 1517
Location	Yingzhou (present day Ying County, Shanxi, China)
Result	Ming victory

Belligerents
Ming dynasty	Northern Yuan

Commanders and leaders
Zhengde Emperor	Dayan Khan

Strength
Unknown	50,000 horsemen

Chinese name
- Traditional Chinese: 應州大捷
- Simplified Chinese: 应州大捷
Transcriptions
Standard Mandarin
- Hanyu Pinyin: Yīngzhōu dàjié

The Battle of Yingzhou was a battle fought between the Ming dynasty of China and the Mongol Northern Yuan dynasty in 1517. The battle took place during the reign of the Zhengde Emperor, who personally led the Ming army after traveling to the northern frontier in search of military distinction. Following several days of fighting, the Mongols withdrew, and the Emperor proclaimed the engagement a victory despite his narrow escape from capture and disputed casualty figures. The campaign drew intense criticism from court officials, who questioned both its necessity and military value. Despite the controversy, the battle was the only major engagement of the sixteenth century in which a Ming field army successfully repelled a large Mongol incursion, and no comparable invasions occurred during the remainder of the Zhengde Emperor's reign.

== Background ==
The Ming dynasty was established in China in 1368 when Zhu Yuanzhang (the Hongwu Emperor), a former peasant rebel, overthrew the Mongol-led Yuan dynasty and forced the Mongols to retreat to the northern steppes. To counter the persistent Mongol threat along the northern frontier, the Hongwu Emperor implemented major military reforms and launched numerous campaigns to secure the border regions. His son, the Yongle Emperor, further strengthened these efforts by personally leading a series of expeditions against the Mongols between 1410 and 1424. Following the Yongle Emperor's death in 1424, Mongol power gradually recovered. In 1449, the Ming suffered a major defeat during the Tumu Crisis, in which the Oirat Mongols captured Emperor Yingzong (r. 1435–1449). The defeat triggered a prolonged period of political and military instability, which lasted until the reign of the Chenghua Emperor (1465–1487).

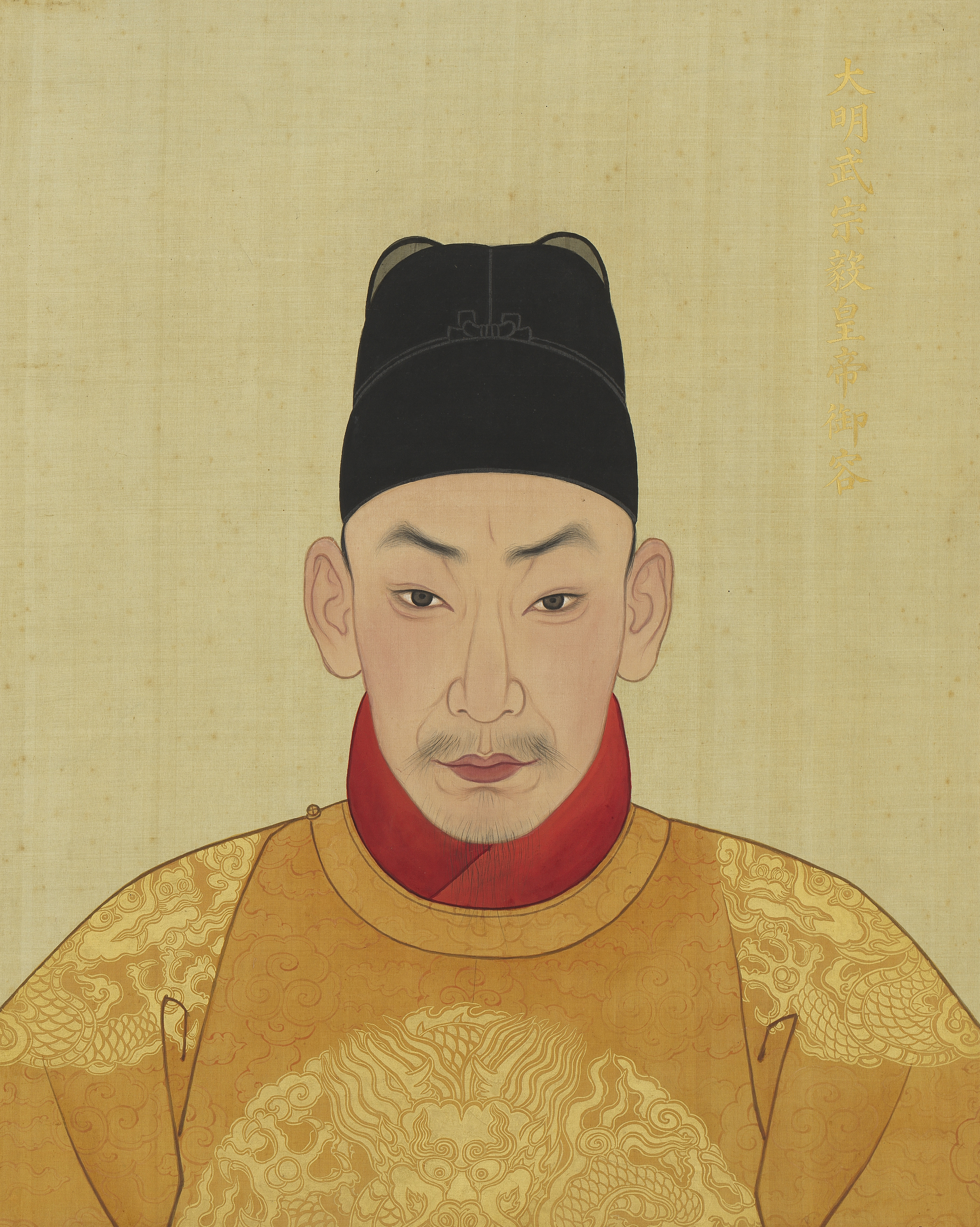
Portrait of the Zhengde Emperor

By 1513, the Zhengde Emperor (r. 1505–1521) had developed a keen interest in military affairs and sought to emulate the martial achievements of his ancestor, the Yongle Emperor. During the reign of his father, the Hongzhi Emperor (1487–1505), the Grand Secretariat, still deeply influenced by the legacy of the Tumu Crisis, had argued that the Ming army could no longer match the mobility of the Mongol cavalry and that a defensive strategy was the only practical option. The Zhengde Emperor rejected this view, believing that a decisive victory over Dayan Khan—who had by then united most of the Mongol tribes and reoccupied the Ordos—would restore the prestige and morale of the Ming military.

At the beginning of 1516, bored with life in Beijing and weary of constant criticism from his officials, the Zhengde Emperor began considering a move to the frontier garrison at Xuanfu. Seeking to distance the Emperor from his favorite, Qian Ning, the general Jiang Bin persuaded him that Xuanfu offered better musicians and women and, more importantly, the opportunity to experience real warfare rather than the mock military exercises held in Beijing. The Emperor departed for Xuanfu in the summer of 1517, arriving in mid-September. The following month, he began styling himself as a general officer and treated his residence there as a military headquarters, issuing orders and requisitions under a general's seal instead of his imperial title and seal.

On 15 October 1517, while staying at a small fort about 40 miles (64 km) southwest of Xuanfu, the Emperor learned that a Mongol force of about 50,000 cavalry under Dayan Khan had crossed the border several days earlier to launch a raid. Viewing the incursion as an opportunity to demonstrate his military ability, he ordered reinforcements at frontier garrisons and appointed commanders for the coming campaign.

== Battle ==
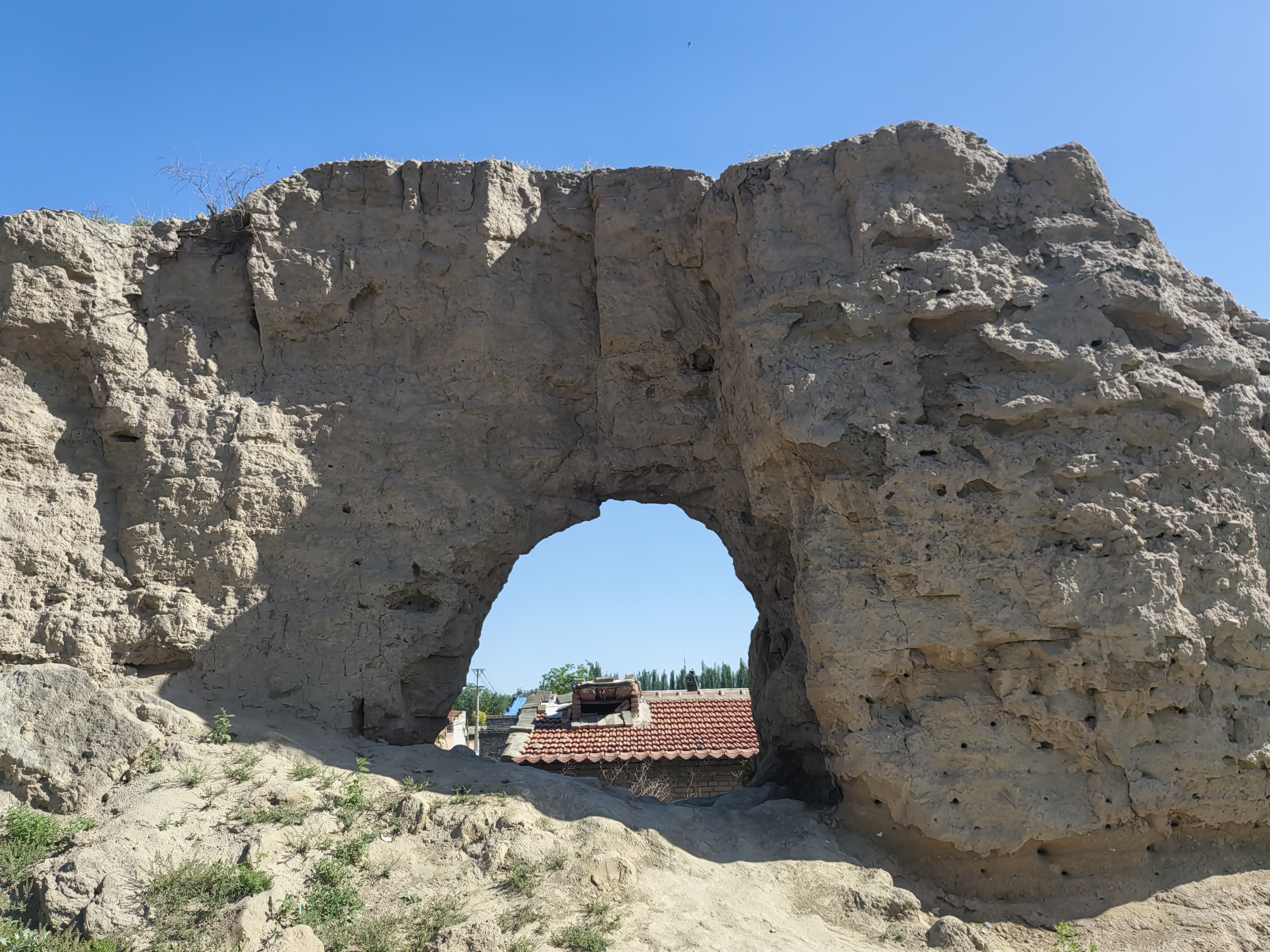
Ruins of the Yingzhou city wall

The battle began on 16 October 1517, followed by several minor skirmishes the next day in which the Mongols repeatedly withdrew after suffering casualties. On 18 October, the fighting escalated into a major engagement near Yingzhou, a garrison city about 40 miles (64 km) south of Datong. The Zhengde Emperor arrived with reinforcements on 19 October and personally directed the fighting the following day. After a full day of combat, the Mongols withdrew at dusk, and the Emperor ordered his forces to pursue them to the border. The pursuit was abandoned only after a severe dust storm made further operations impossible.

According to the Ming Veritable Records, there were 16 Mongol casualties compared to 52 Ming troops killed and 563 injured. The Emperor's sedan chair was nearly captured. Li Xun, a Chinese historian specializing in the Ming and Qing dynasties, considers the casualties on both sides to have been broadly comparable and questions the reliability of the figures recorded in the Veritable Records. He argues that the Mongols were unlikely to have suffered only 16 losses, noting that they would otherwise have had little reason to retreat rather than exploit their advantage. Li further contends that the casualty figures recorded in the Veritable Records reflect a political intent to portray the Battle of Yingzhou as a failed campaign resulting from the Zhengde Emperor's disregard for his ancestors' injunctions.

== Aftermath ==
Although the Emperor was almost captured in the engagement with greater losses on his side, he and his generals considered it a victory and ordered two top commanders to inform Beijing quickly. A large number of soldiers and officers were awarded with Jiang Bin being awarded title of Earl (伯; bo).

Ming officials intensely disapproved of the emperor's actions as well of the battle. Minister of War Wang Qiong was not impressed and stated there weren't many details about the battle and that while the Mongols did indeed withdraw, there were concerns they could easily come back for another attack so there should be a further investigation. The Emperor stated this was not needed. Supervising Secretary Wang Xuanxi stated the Shaanxi defenders had all been deployed either west to Gansu or east to Xuanfu. With the Yellow River frozen during the winter, large areas were now open to Mongol attacks. In addition, there was a lack of supplies. In response, the Emperor authorized an empire-wide sale of military titles, academic placements, honors, etc. to raise funds for supplies.

The Emperor returned to Xuanfu in November 1517 and eventually Beijing on 15 February 2018. Court officials were ordered to wait for the Emperor outside the northwestern gate of Beijing. He appeared late in the evening, armed and on horseback, accompanied by a cavalry escort. He told the officials that he had actually killed a Mongol himself. Then he laid out in front of the Fengtian Gate weapons and other captured Mongol gear for officials to inspect. Afterwards, he publicly issued rewards of silver badges and colored silk in front of the Hall of Literary Brilliance. Wang Xuanxi once again stated his disapproval for the battle. He and some official refused to accept the awards. The Emperor ignored them.

On 7 August 1518, the Emperor told the Grand Secretariat to draft an edict. He stated that military discipline on the borders was lax, so a campaign army under a certain general named "Zhu Shou" (朱壽; "Long-life Zhu") was to be sent to inspect the borders, and they were to draft the requisite edict for it. This general was none other than the Emperor himself who had made up a new name. He kept up the pretense that this general was someone other than the Emperor for the rest of his reign. The Emperor also ordered the Ministry of War to award this general a noble rank for his exploits in the campaign against Dayan Khan. In October 1518, Zhu Shou was formally awarded the rank of Duke and a stipend of 5,000 dan of grain per year.

Another dispute with the officials about the battle arose later when a list of 54,449 meritorious troops was submitted. Wang Qiong reduced the list to 9,555 to which the Emperor stated that Wang was being disrespectful. The officials retorted saying the battle involved more losses than gains in terms of casualties and that the list included countless men who never left Beijing. Although the Emperor declined to respond, Wang Qiong eventually caved in and was rewarded.

Despite disputes over the details of the battle, it was the only time during the sixteenth century that Ming armies turned back a large Mongol army and the emperor's presence on the field of battle certainly influenced the outcome. No significant Mongol invasions of China occurred during the entire reign of the Zhengde Emperor.
