= 1519 =

1519 in various calendars
- Gregorian calendar: 1519; MDXIX
- Ab urbe condita: 2272
- Armenian calendar: 968; ԹՎ ՋԿԸ
- Assyrian calendar: 6269
- Balinese saka calendar: 1440–1441
- Bengali calendar: 925–926
- Berber calendar: 2469
- English Regnal year: 10 Hen. 8 – 11 Hen. 8
- Buddhist calendar: 2063
- Burmese calendar: 881
- Byzantine calendar: 7027–7028
- Chinese calendar: 戊寅年 (Earth Tiger); 4216 or 4009 — to — 己卯年 (Earth Rabbit); 4217 or 4010
- Coptic calendar: 1235–1236
- Discordian calendar: 2685
- Ethiopian calendar: 1511–1512
- Hebrew calendar: 5279–5280
- Hindu calendars
- Vikram Samvat: 1575–1576
- Shaka Samvat: 1440–1441
- Kali Yuga: 4619–4620
- Holocene calendar: 11519
- Igbo calendar: 519–520
- Iranian calendar: 897–898
- Islamic calendar: 924–926
- Japanese calendar: Eishō 16 (永正１６年)
- Javanese calendar: 1436–1437
- Julian calendar: 1519; MDXIX
- Korean calendar: 3852
- Minguo calendar: 393 before ROC 民前393年
- Nanakshahi calendar: 51
- Thai solar calendar: 2061–2062
- Tibetan calendar: ས་ཕོ་སྟག་ལོ་ (male Earth-Tiger); 1645 or 1264 or 492 — to — ས་མོ་ཡོས་ལོ་ (female Earth-Hare); 1646 or 1265 or 493

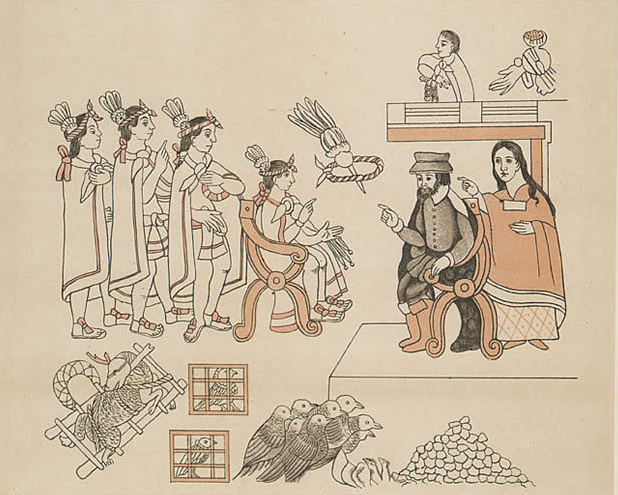
November 8 – Hernán Cortés enters Tenochtitlan.

September 20: Ferdinand Magellan begins his voyage around the world with a fleet of five ships.

Year 1519 (MDXIX) was a common year starting on Saturday of the Julian calendar, the 1519th year of the Common Era (CE) and Anno Domini (AD) designations, the 519th year of the 2nd millennium, the 19th year of the 16th century, and the 10th and last year of the 1510s decade.

== Events ==
=== January–March ===
- January 1 – Ulrich Zwingli preaches for the first time, as people's priest of the Great Minister in Zurich.
- January 12 – Maximilian I, Holy Roman Emperor, dies at the age of 59 after a reign of slightly less than 11 years. An imperial election by the leaders of the various member states of the Empire is scheduled for June 28.
- February 10 – The Spanish conquistador Hernán Cortés and his conquistadores depart from Cuba toward the island of Cozumel in Mexico to begin a mission of conquest.
- February 18 – Because of the large population of Jews included converts to Christianity ("New Christians") in the colony of Portuguese India at Goa, King Manuel I of Portugal announces that there will be no further appointment of New Christians to government offices, but affirms that those already in office are not to be dismissed
- March 4 – Hernán Cortés and his conquistadores land in Mexico.

=== April–June ===
- April 21 (Maundy Thursday) – Hernán Cortés reaches San Juan de Ulúa, and sets foot the next day (Good Friday) on the beach of modern-day Veracruz.
- May 4 – Giulio de' Medici, who will later become Pope Clement VII becomes the Duke of the Florentine Republic upon the death of his father, Lorenzo de' Medici, Duke of Urbino.
- June 27 – The Leipzig Debate begins at the Pleissenburg lecture hall in the German city of Leipzig in Saxony, as Martin Luther defends his ideas on the Protestant Reformation against challenges by Johann Eck, the German leader of the anti-Reformation movement. While there, he is challenged to a theological debate by Johann Eck, the German leader of the anti-Reformation movement. The debate lasts until July 15 and gains new followers to Luther's theology.
- June 28 – King Carlos I of Spain is elected as the new Holy Roman Emperor and takes the regnal name of Charles V. He will reign until 1556).

=== July–September ===
- July 4 – Martin Luther joins the debate regarding papal authority, against Johann Eck at Leipzig.
- July 10 – The Prince of Ning rebellion begins, after Zhu Chenhao declares the Ming dynasty's Zhengde Emperor a usurper, and leads his army north in an attempt to capture Nanjing.
- July 26 – King Charles of Spain issues a royal order prohibiting navigator Rui Faleiro from participating in the Magellan expedition, after Portugal's ambassador to Spain reports that Faleiro is suffering from a nervous breakdown.
- August 10 – The Magellan expedition departs from Seville in Spain.
- August 15 – Panama City is founded by Spanish conquistador Pedro Arias Dávila.
- August 20 – Ming Dynasty Chinese philosopher and general Wang Yangming, governor of Jiangxi, defeats Zhu Chenhao, ending the Prince of Ning rebellion. Wang has expressed the intention of using fo–lang–ji cannons in suppressing the rebellion, probably the earliest reference in China to the breech-loading Frankish culverin.
- September 20 – Ferdinand Magellan departs from Spain with a fleet of five ships and a crew of 270 men, to sail westbound to the Spice Islands.

=== October–December ===
- October 12 – Hernán Cortés and his men, accompanied by 3,000 Tlaxcalans, enter Cholula.
- November 8 – Hernán Cortés enters Tenochtitlan, capital of the Aztec Empire, and appears at the court of Aztec ruler Moctezuma II.
- December 6 – The Magellan expedition reaches the South American coast.
- December 11 – At Toruń, the members of the Sejm of the Kingdom of Poland vote to approve a war against the Teutonic Knights and to assess new taxes to recruit mercenary troops.

=== Date unknown ===
- The first civil revolt in Anatolia takes place, led by Alevi preacher Celâl.
- The Spanish invade Barbados.
- Spanish conquistador and founder of Panama City, Gaspar de Espinosa, sails up the Pacific coast from Panama to Nicaragua, landing at the Gulf of Nicoya.
- Havana moves from the southern to the northern part of Cuba.
- A large pandemic spreads from the Greater Antilles into Central America, and perhaps as far as Peru in South America. This widespread epidemic kills off much of the indigenous populations in these areas (the first widely documented epidemic in the New World).
- Central Mexico Amerindians' population reaches 25.3 million.
- The Mexican Indian Wars begin.
- Cacao comes to Europe.
- St. Olaf's Church, Tallinn is completed in Estonia.
- The first recorded fatal accident involving a gun in England is recorded at Welton, East Riding of Yorkshire.

== Births ==
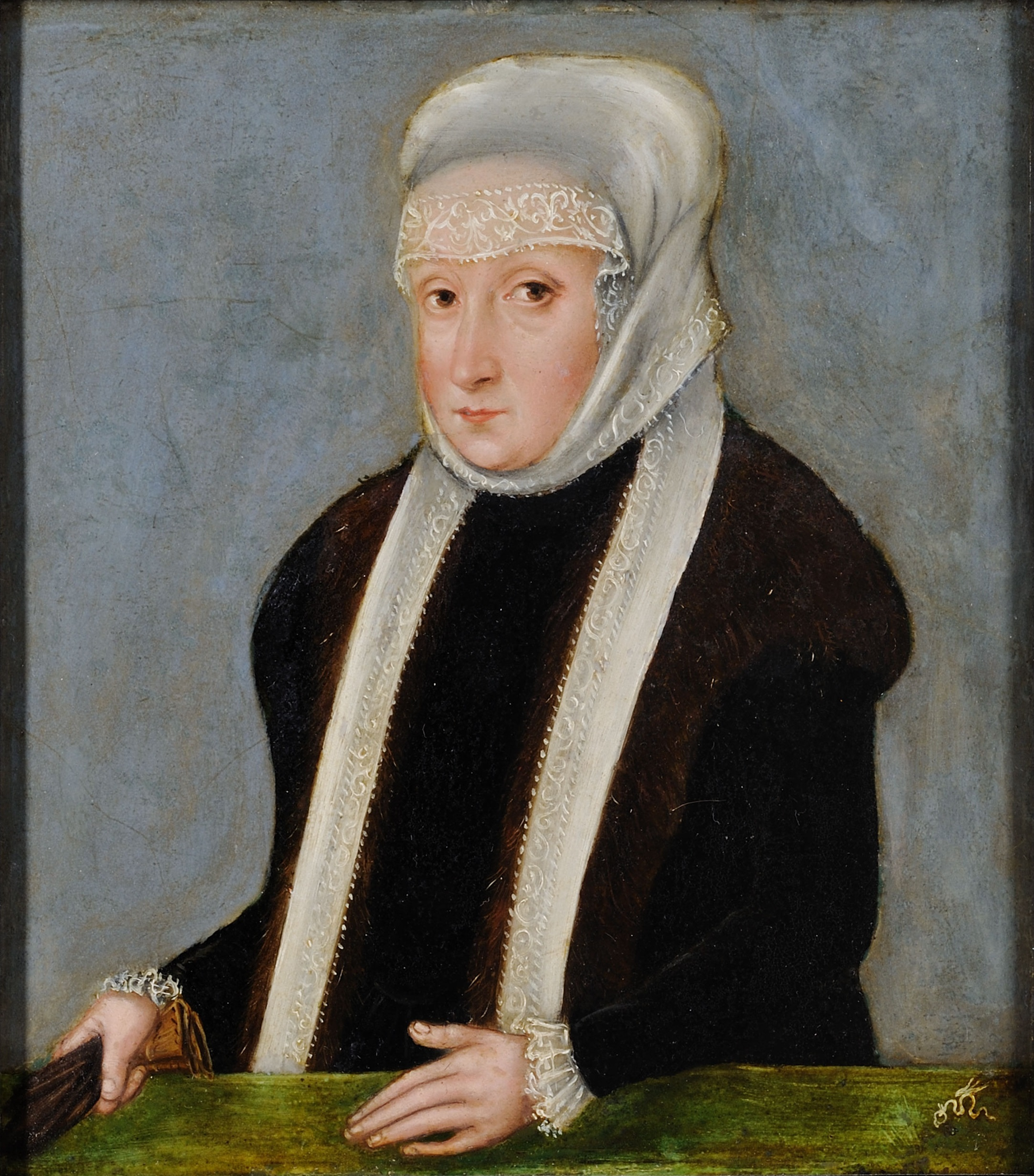
Isabella Jagiellon

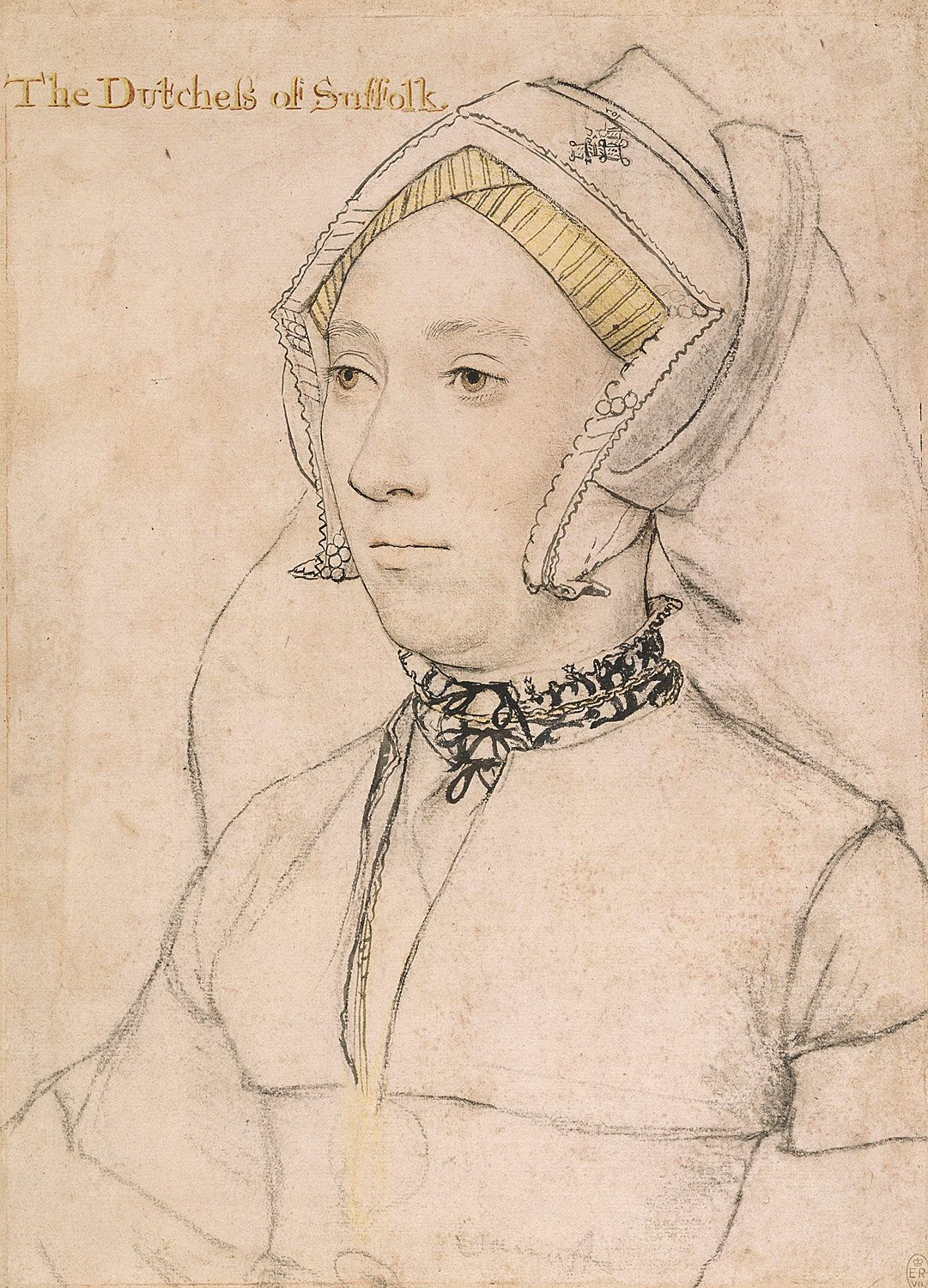
Catherine Brandon, Duchess of Suffolk

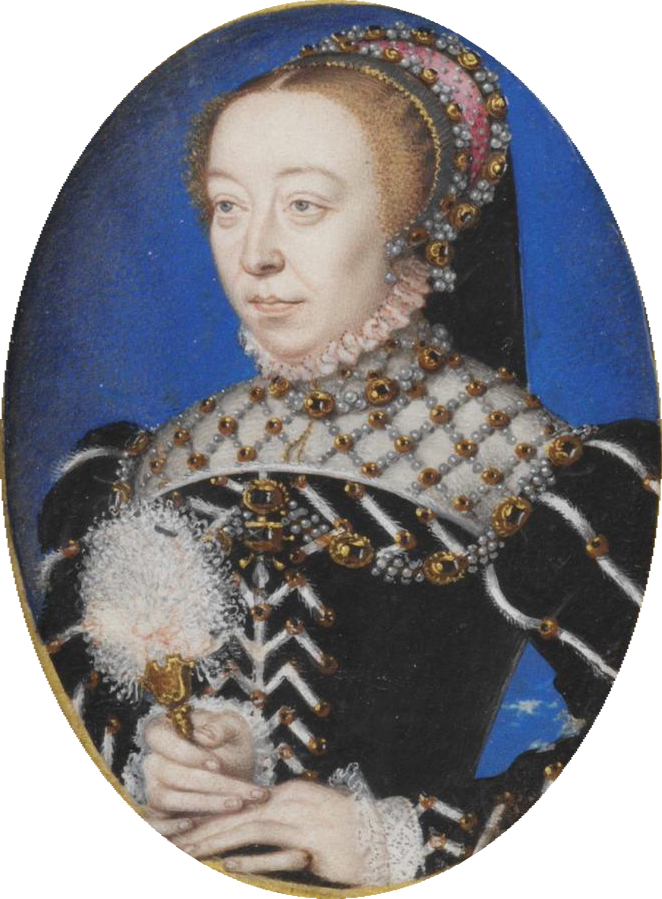
Catherine de' Medici

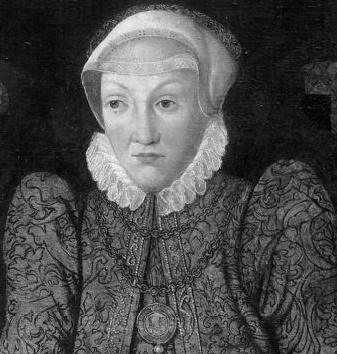
Marie of Brandenburg-Kulmbach

- January 1 – Gómez Pérez Dasmariñas, Spanish colonial administrator (d. 1593)
- January 18 – Isabella Jagiellon, queen consort of Hungary (d. 1559)
- February 5 – René of Châlon, Prince of the House of Orange (d. 1544)
- February 15 – Pedro Menéndez de Avilés, first Spanish Governor of Florida (d. 1574)
- February 16 – Gaspard de Coligny, French Huguenot leader (d. 1572)
- February 17 – François, Duke of Guise, French soldier and politician (d. 1563)
- February 19 – Froben Christoph of Zimmern, author of the Zimmern Chronicle (d. 1566)
- March 4
  - Hindal Mirza, Mughal Emperor (d. 1551)
  - Adrian Stokes, English politician (d. 1586)
- March 17 – Thoinot Arbeau, French priest and author (d. 1595)
- March 22 – Catherine Brandon, Duchess of Suffolk, English noblewoman (d. 1580)
- March 31 – King Henry II of France (d. 1559)
- April 13 – Catherine de' Medici, Italian noblewoman, queen consort of Henry II of France and regent of France (d. 1589)
- May 27 – Girolamo Mei, Italian humanist historian (d. 1594)
- June 6 – Andrea Cesalpino, Italian philosopher, physician, and botanist (d. 1603)
- June 12 – Cosimo I de' Medici, Grand Duke of Tuscany (d. 1574)
- June 15 – Henry FitzRoy, Duke of Richmond and Somerset, illegitimate son of King Henry VIII of England (d. 1536)
- June 23 – Johannes Goropius Becanus, Dutch physician, linguist and humanist (d. 1572)
- June 24 – Theodore Beza, French theologian (d. 1605)
- July 20 – Pope Innocent IX (d. 1591)
- September 23 – Francis, Count of Enghien, French military leader (d. 1546)
- October 14 – Marie of Brandenburg-Kulmbach, Princess of Brandenburg-Kulmbach and by marriage Electress Palatine (d. 1567)
- November 9 – Ogasawara Nagatoki, Japanese daimyō (d. 1583)
- November 22 – Johannes Crato von Krafftheim, German humanist and physician (d. 1585)
- date unknown
  - Janet Beaton, Scottish noblewoman (d. 1569)
  - Nicholas Grimald, English poet (d. 1562)
  - Edwin Sandys, English archbishop (d. 1588)
  - Barbara Thenn, Austrian merchant and Münzmeister (d. 1579)
  - Imagawa Yoshimoto, Japanese warlord (d. 1560)
  - Paula Vicente, Portuguese artist, musician and writer (d. 1576)
  - Stanisław Zamoyski, Polish nobleman (d. 1572)
- probable
  - Thomas Gresham, English merchant and financier (d. 1579)
  - Edmund Grindal, Archbishop of Canterbury (d. 1583)
- possible
  - Catherine Howard, fifth Queen of Henry VIII of England (born between 1518 and 1524; d. 1542)

== Deaths ==
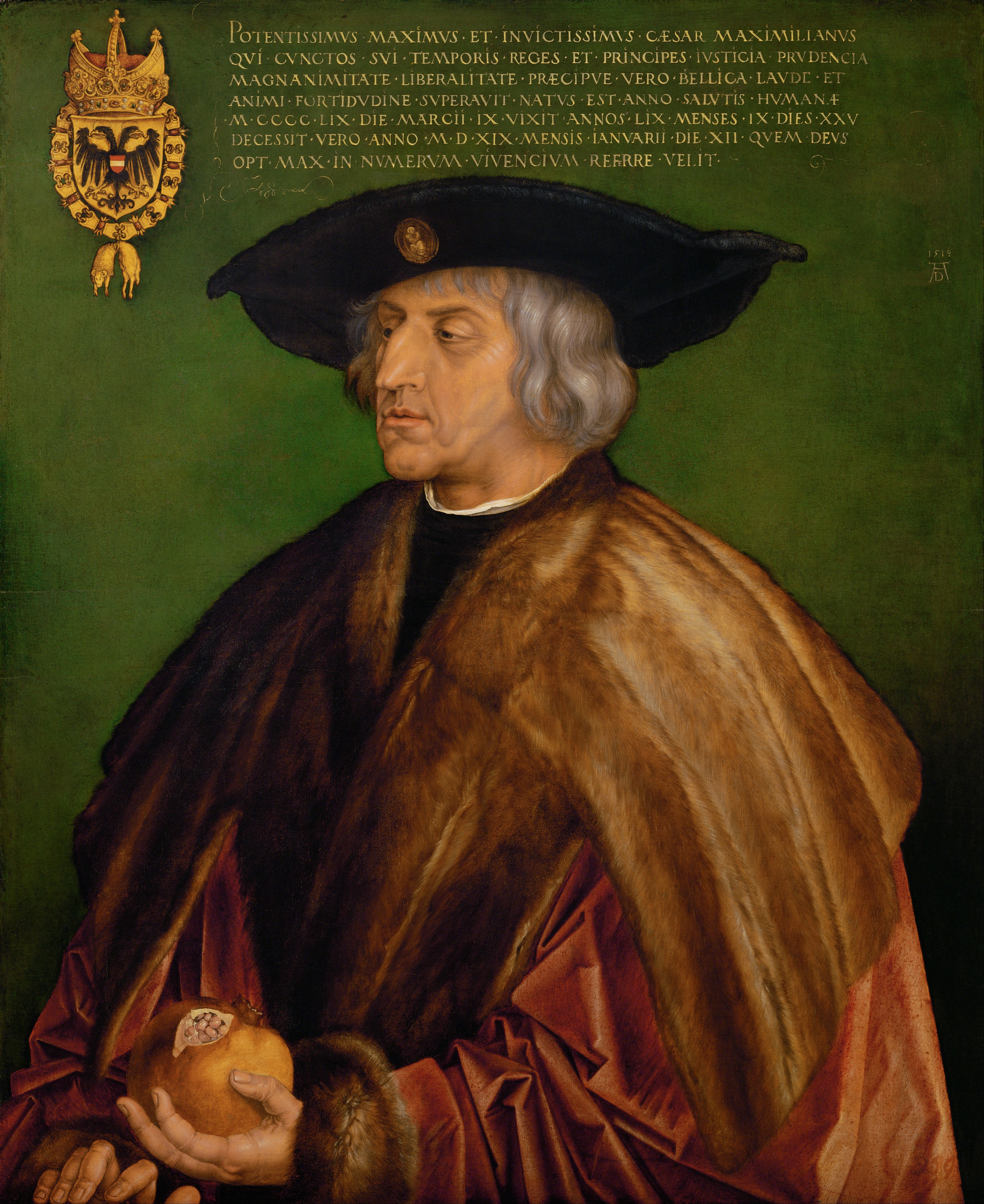
Maximilian I, Holy Roman Emperor

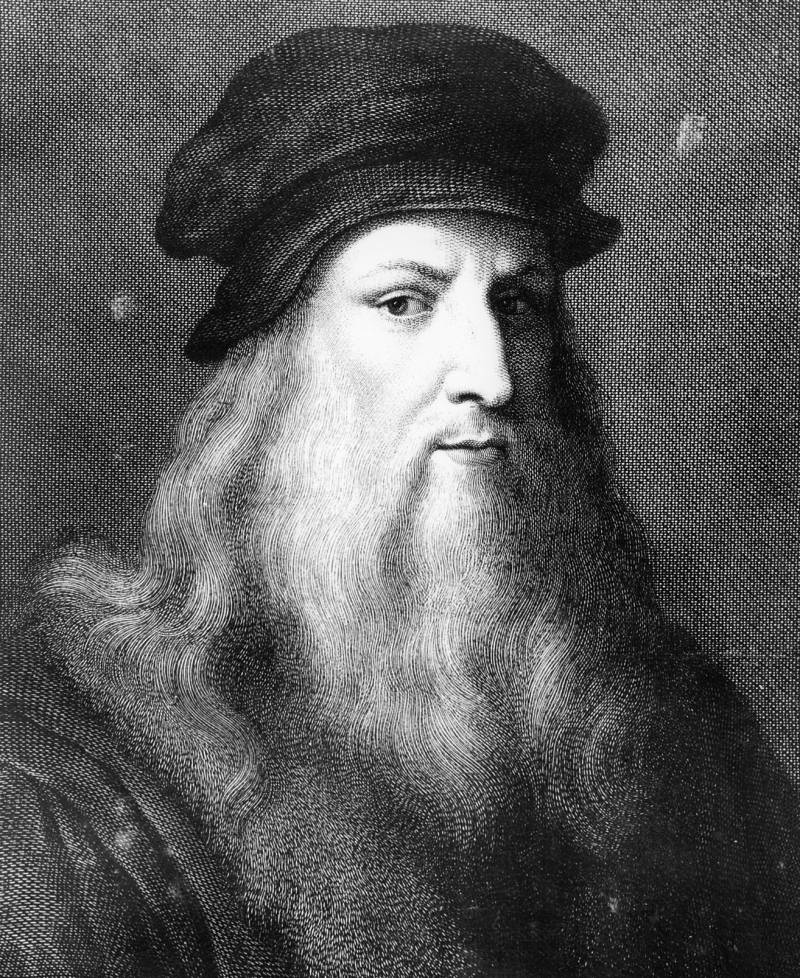
Leonardo da Vinci

- January 12
  - Maximilian I, Holy Roman Emperor (b. 1459)
  - Vasco Núñez de Balboa, Spanish explorer (b. 1475)
- February 6 – Lorenz von Bibra, Prince-Bishop of the Bishopric of Würzburg (b. 1459)
- March 29 – Francesco II Gonzaga, Marquess of Mantua (b. 1466)
- April 15 – Henry, Count of Württemberg-Montbéliard (1473–1482) (b. 1448)
- April 18 – Sibylle of Bavaria, Electress Palatine consort (b. 1489)
- May 2 – Leonardo da Vinci, Italian inventor and artist (b. 1452)
- May 4 – Lorenzo de' Medici, Duke of Urbino (b. 1492)
- May 13 – Artus Gouffier, Lord of Boissy, French nobleman and politician (b. 1475)
- June 2 – Philippe de Luxembourg, French Catholic cardinal (b. 1445)
- June 24 – Lucrezia Borgia, Duchess of Ferrara (b. 1480)
- July 13 – Zhu Youyuan, Ming dynasty politician (b. 1476)
- July 27 – Zanobi Acciaioli, librarian of the Vatican (b. 1461)
- August 11 – Johann Tetzel, German opponent of the Reformation (b. 1465)
- August 23 – Philibert Berthelier, Swiss patriot (b. c. 1465)
- September – John Colet, English churchman and educator (b. 1467)
- date unknown
  - William Grocyn, English scholar (b. 1446)
  - Ambrosius Holbein, German painter (b. 1494)
