= 1583 =

1583 in various calendars
- Gregorian calendar: 1583; MDLXXXIII
- Ab urbe condita: 2336
- Armenian calendar: 1032; ԹՎ ՌԼԲ
- Assyrian calendar: 6333
- Balinese saka calendar: 1504–1505
- Bengali calendar: 989–990
- Berber calendar: 2533
- English Regnal year: 25 Eliz. 1 – 26 Eliz. 1
- Buddhist calendar: 2127
- Burmese calendar: 945
- Byzantine calendar: 7091–7092
- Chinese calendar: 壬午年 (Water Horse); 4280 or 4073 — to — 癸未年 (Water Goat); 4281 or 4074
- Coptic calendar: 1299–1300
- Discordian calendar: 2749
- Ethiopian calendar: 1575–1576
- Hebrew calendar: 5343–5344
- Hindu calendars
- Vikram Samvat: 1639–1640
- Shaka Samvat: 1504–1505
- Kali Yuga: 4683–4684
- Holocene calendar: 11583
- Igbo calendar: 583–584
- Iranian calendar: 961–962
- Islamic calendar: 990–991
- Japanese calendar: Tenshō 11 (天正１１年)
- Javanese calendar: 1502–1503
- Julian calendar: Gregorian minus 10 days
- Korean calendar: 3916
- Minguo calendar: 329 before ROC 民前329年
- Nanakshahi calendar: 115
- Thai solar calendar: 2125–2126
- Tibetan calendar: ཆུ་ཕོ་རྟ་ལོ་ (male Water-Horse); 1709 or 1328 or 556 — to — ཆུ་མོ་ལུག་ལོ་ (female Water-Sheep); 1710 or 1329 or 557

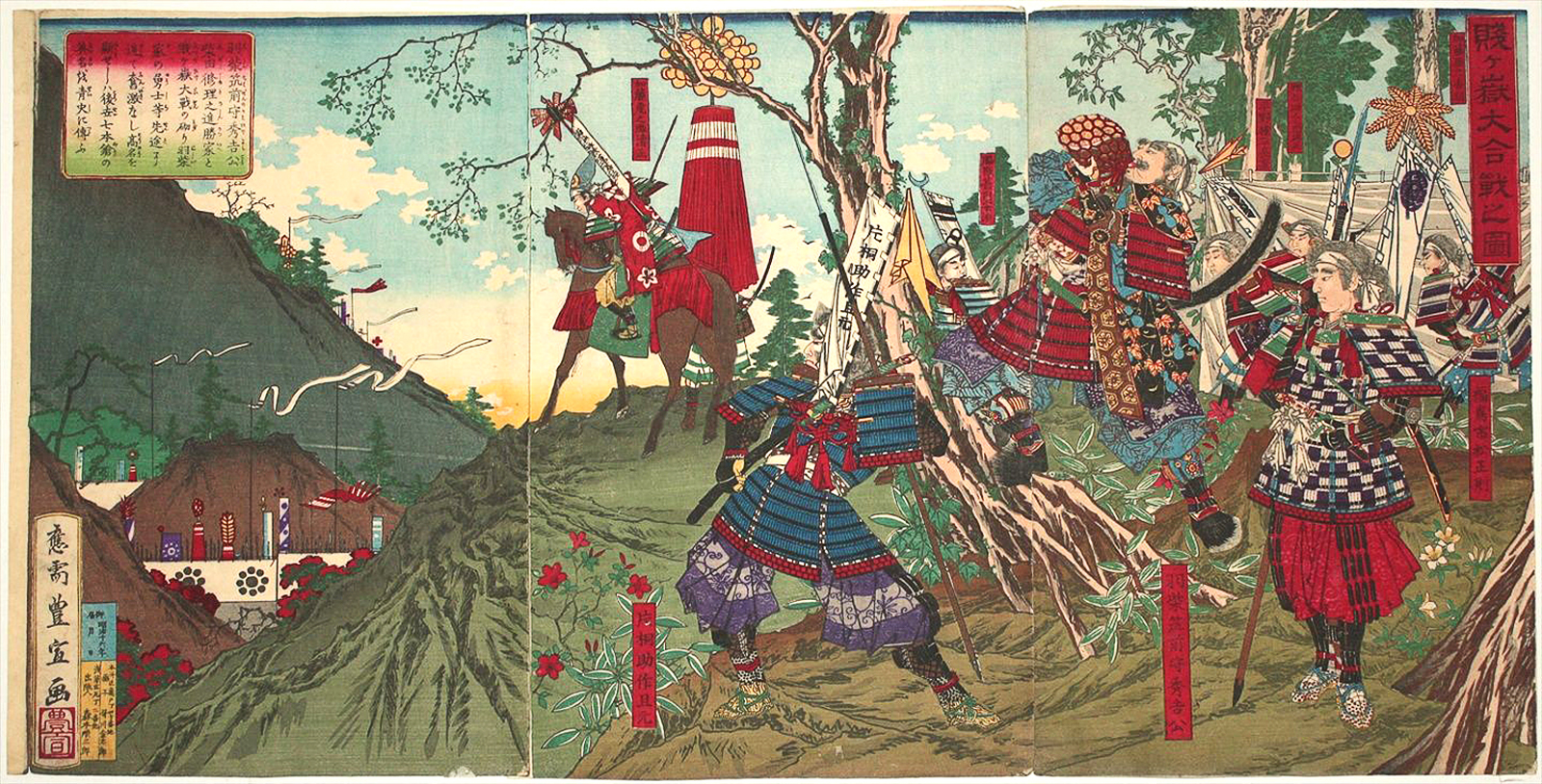
May 20-21: Battle of Shizugatake

1583 (MDLXXXIII) was a common year starting on Saturday of the Gregorian calendar and a common year starting on Tuesday of the Julian calendar, the 1583rd year of the Common Era (CE) and Anno Domini (AD) designations, the 583rd year of the 2nd millennium, the 83rd year of the 16th century, and the 4th year of the 1580s decade. As of the start of 1583, the Gregorian calendar was 10 days ahead of the Julian calendar, which remained in localized use until 1923.

== Events ==
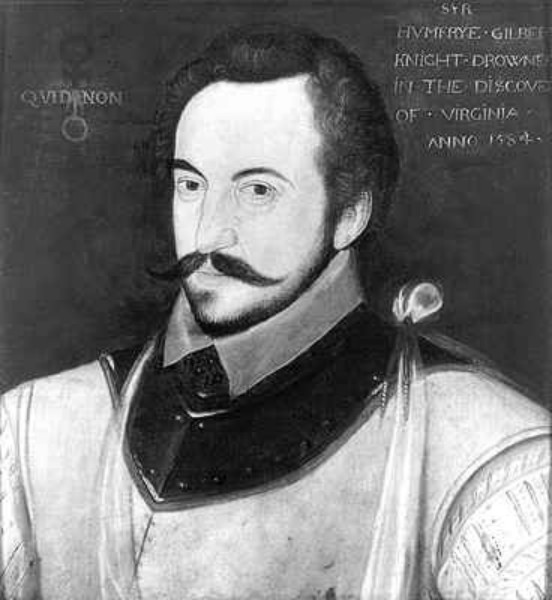
August 5: Humphrey Gilbert claims the island of Newfoundland on behalf of England.

=== January–March ===
- January 1 – The Duchy of Savoy adopts the Gregorian Calendar, replacing the Julian Calendar.
- January 18 – Francis, Duke of Anjou, attacks Antwerp.
- February 4 – Gebhard Truchsess von Waldburg, newly converted to Calvinism, formally marries Agnes von Mansfeld-Eisleben, a former canoness of Gerresheim, while retaining his position as Archbishop-Elector of Cologne.
- February 7 – In the Netherlands, the Siege of Eindhoven by the Spanish Army begins. The walled city will fall in April.
- March 10 (February 28 O.S.) – The Queen Elizabeth's Men troupe of actors is founded in England by order of Queen Elizabeth to Edmund Tilney, the royal Master of the Revels.

=== April–June ===
- April 9 – A Burmese Army force of 16,000 men, commanded by Thado Dhamma Yaza II of Prome and Nawrahta Minsaw of Lan Na to suppress the rebellious of the Shan States in the modern-day Yunnan province of China, is welcomed by King Nanda Bayin at the royal capital, Pegu, after a successful punitive expedition. The commanders bring with them the rebel chief from the Sanda state.
- April 19 – Queen Elizabeth dissolves the English Parliament which had been convened in 1572 but last met in 1581.
- April 23
  - The Kingdom of England establishes its first diplomatic relations with the Ottoman Empire.
  - After a siege of 75 days, Dutch Republic commander Hendrik van Bonnivet surrenders Eindhoven to the Spanish Netherlands.
- April 25 – In a clash between a 50,000-man Persian Empire force and the Ottoman Empire for control of the Caucasus region in modern-day Russia, the Ottomans are routed.
- May 11 – In modern-day Russia, on the Caspian Sea, the three-day "Battle of Torches" ends as Ottoman Empire troops defeat forces of the Persian Empire.
- May 21 – Battle of Shizugatake in Japan: Shibata Katsuie is defeated by Toyotomi Hideyoshi, who goes on to commence construction of Osaka Castle.
- May 22 – Ernest of Bavaria is elected as Roman Catholic Archbishop of Cologne, in opposition to Gebhard Truchsess von Waldburg. The opposition rapidly turns into armed struggle, the Cologne War within the Electorate of Cologne, beginning with the Destruction of the Oberstift.
- May 28 – The first installment of the translation by Jurij Dalmatin of the Bible into the Slovene language, Bibilija, tu je vse svetu pismu stariga inu noviga testamenta (The Bible, featuring the complete Old and New Testaments), is published in Wittenberg.
- June 17 – Spanish troops under the command of Alexander Farnese, Duke of Parma overwhelm a combined army of Dutch, French and English soldiers at the Battle of Steenbergen in the modern-day Netherlands. The multinational force sustains 3,200 people killed or wounded.
- June 18 – In England, the first known life insurance policy is issued. The Royal Exchange of London accepts a premium from William Gibbons, agreeing to pay a group of 30 beneficiaries a total of £383, 6s. 8d if he dies on or before June 17, 1584. Gibbons dies on May 29, 1584, and the Royal Exchange refuses to pay until a court rejects the insurer's argument that a month is actually four weeks or 28 days.
- June 27 – Ten months after being taken hostage on August 23, 1582 in the Raid of Ruthven, the 17-year-old King James VI of Scotland is able to escape Falkland Prison and flees to safety in St. Andrews.

=== July–September ===
- July 25 – Cuncolim Revolt: The first documented battle of India's independence against a European colonial ruler is fought by the Desais of Cuncolim in Goa, against the Portuguese.
- August 5 – Sir Humphrey Gilbert, on the site of the modern-day city of St. John's, claims the island of Newfoundland on behalf of England, marking the beginning of the British Empire.
- August 19 – Petru Cercel enters Bucharest, and becomes Prince of Wallachia.
- August 29 – English ship Delight, with Humphrey Gilbert's expedition, becomes the first of over 350 ships over time to run aground and be wrecked on Sable Island in the North Atlantic.
- September 4 – King James VI of Scotland orders a gift to Colonel William Stewart in recognition of Stewart's rescue of the King from prison. Colonel Stewart is presented with some of the jewels of Mary, Queen of Scots (the King's mother).
- September 9 – English ship Squirrel, the flagship of explorer, Sir Humphrey Gilbert, sinks in a storm with all hands along with all but one of Gilbert's colonial expedition. Gilbert and his men had been returning from North America after claiming Newfoundland in the name of Queen Elizabeth.

=== October–December ===
- October 14 – In Scotland, the University of Edinburgh holds its first classes, accepting more than 80 students as "Tounis College". In continuous operation for more than 440 years, the University will have more than 41,000 students.
- October 16 – King Philip II of Spain orders the transfer of Abada the rhinoceros from the Casa de Campo public park of Madrid, to the menagerie at his residence at El Escorial.
- October 17 – Peter the Lame becomes Prince of Moldavia (in modern-day Romania) for the third and last time, reigning until 1591.
- October 18 – In South America, the Third Council of Lima comes to an end after two months after being convened to provide a consistent doctrine for the Roman Catholic Church in the Viceroyalty of Peru. Among other things, the Council approves the treatment of the native population "not like slaves but as free men" as part of evangelism and conversion to Christianity, as well as the use of the Quechua language and the Aymara language to spread the gospel. The use of Spanish is ordered for church services, and Latin is forbidden.
- October 24 – Jan van Hembyze becomes the last leader of the Calvinist Republic of Ghent after a coup d'etat against the ruling Count of Flanders. Hembyze's action leads days later to the siege of Ghent by Spanish General Alexander Farnese.
- November 4
  - Francis Throckmorton, instigator of the Throckmorton Plot to overthrow Queen Elizabeth I of England, is arrested. Convicted of treason, he is executed on July 10, 1584.
  - Gerolamo Chiavari is elected to a 2-year term as the new Doge of the Republic of Genoa to succeed Gerolamo De Franchi Toso.
- November 5 – Willem IV van den Bergh, the Stadtholder of Guelders for the Dutch Republic is arrested along with his family and charged with treason on suspicion of having allowed the Spanish Army to seize Zutphen. Imprisoned for five months, he is released in March after promising to retire from public service.
- November 13 – In India, the city of Allahabad (modern-day Prayagraj in the state of Uttar Pradesh) is founded as a strategic fortress by Akbar, Emperor of the Mughal Empire.Surendra Nath Sinha (1974).
- November 24 – Philippe Hurault de Cheverny is appointed as the new Chief Minister of France by King Henri III upon the death of René de Birague, who had governed for nine years. Hurault will serve until 1589.
- December 17 – Cologne War: The Siege of Godesberg (begun on November 18) concludes when Catholic forces under Prince-elector-archbishop Ernest of Bavaria capture the strategic position, from defenders of the Calvinist convert Gebhard Truchsess von Waldburg.

=== Date unknown ===
- The world's oldest, intact, surviving amusement park, Dyrehavsbakken, is founded north of Copenhagen.
- The current building housing the Bunch Of Grapes pub is built on Narrow Street in Limehouse, London. Referred to by Charles Dickens in Our Mutual Friend as "The Six Jolly Fellowship Porters", it still stands in the 21st century, much rebuilt and renamed 'The Grapes'.
- The Ottoman fleet crosses into the Western Mediterranean and raids the Italian coastline. In Corsica, the towns of Sartene and Arbellara are sacked (summer).

== Births ==
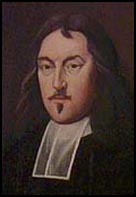
Peter Bulkley

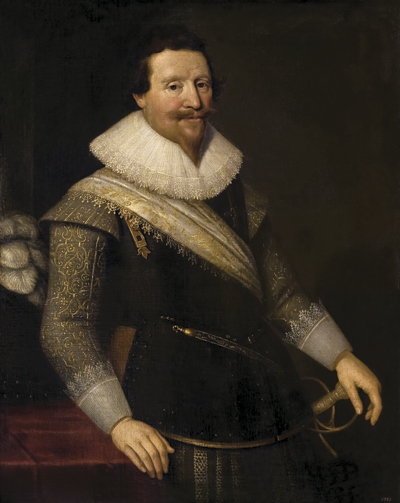
Albrecht von Wallenstein

- January 8 – Simon Episcopius, Dutch theologian (d. 1643)
- January 12 – Niccolò Alamanni, Greek-born Roman antiquarian (d. 1626)
- January 31 – Peter Bulkley, English and later American Puritan (d. 1659)
- February 4 – John Ley, English priest (d. 1662)
- February 17 – Johann Heinrich Alting, German Lutheran theologian (d. 1644)
- February 23 – Jean-Baptiste Morin, French mathematician (d. 1656)
- March 3 – Edward Herbert, 1st Baron Herbert of Cherbury, English diplomat, poet, and philosopher (d. 1648)
- April 4 – Franciscus Quaresmius, Italian writer and orientalist (d. 1650)
- April 8 – Nikolaus, Count Esterházy, Hungarian noble (d. 1645)
- April 10 – Hugo Grotius, Dutch philosopher and writer (d. 1645)
- May 1 – Orazio Grassi, Italian Jesuit priest, architect and scientist (d. 1654)
- May 10 – Fernando Afán de Ribera, duke of Alcalá de los Gazules, Spanish diplomat (d. 1637)
- May 26 – Susanna Hall, Daughter of William Shakespeare (d. 1649)
- June 16 – Axel Oxenstierna, Lord High Chancellor of Sweden (d. 1654)
- June 20 – Jacob De la Gardie, Swedish soldier and statesman (d. 1652)
- June 22 – Joachim Ernst, Margrave of Brandenburg-Ansbach (1603–1625) (d. 1625)
- June 27 – Christopher von Dohna, German politician and scholar (d. 1637)
- July 2 – Dodo Knyphausen, German soldier (d. 1636)
- July 9 – John, Prince of Schleswig-Holstein, Danish prince (d. 1602)
- July 20 – Alban Roe, English Benedictine martyr (d. 1642)
- July 22 – Jacobus Trigland, Dutch theologian (d. 1654)
- August 19 – Daišan, Manchu politician (d. 1648)
- August 21
  - Denis Pétau, French Jesuit theologian (d. 1652)
  - Eleanor of Prussia, Electress consort of Brandenburg (d. 1607)
- August 26 – Adam, Count of Schwarzenberg, German politician (d. 1641)
- August 31 – Richard Harrison, English politician (d. 1655)
- September 23 – Christian II, Elector of Saxony from 1591 to 1611 (d. 1611)
- September 24 – Albrecht von Wallenstein, Austrian general (d. 1634)
- September 29 – John VIII, Count of Nassau-Siegen (1623–1638) (d. 1638)
- September – Girolamo Frescobaldi, Italian composer (d. 1643)
- October 22 – Laurens Reael, Dutch admiral (d. 1637)
- November 10 – Anthony Günther, Count of Oldenburg (d. 1667)
- November 15 – Théophile Raynaud, French theologian (d. 1663)
- November 17 – Archduke Maximilian Ernest of Austria, Austrian archduke (d. 1616)
- November 24 – Juan Martínez de Jáuregui y Aguilar, Spanish poet (d. 1641)
- December 25 – Orlando Gibbons, English composer (d. 1625)
- date unknown
  - Hendrick Jacobszoon Lucifer, Dutch pirate and buccaneer (d. 1627)
  - John Beaumont, English poet (d. 1627)
  - Bonaventura Elzevir, Dutch printer (d. 1652)
  - Stanisław Lubomirski, Polish nobleman (d. 1649)
  - Philip Massinger, English dramatist (d. 1640)
  - Hayashi Razan, Japanese neo-Confucianist scholar (d. 1657)
- probable
  - Alexander Henderson, Scottish theologian (d. 1646)
  - Nzinga, warrior sovereign queen of Ndongo and Matamba (d. 1663)
  - Aurelian Townshend, English poet (d. 1643)

== Deaths ==
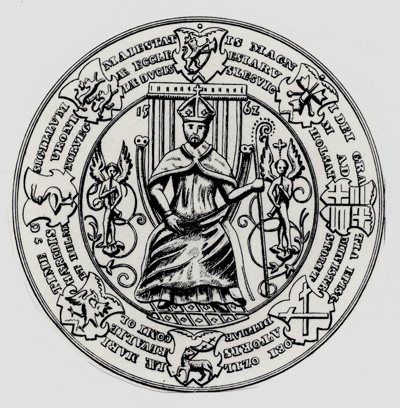
King Magnus of Livonia

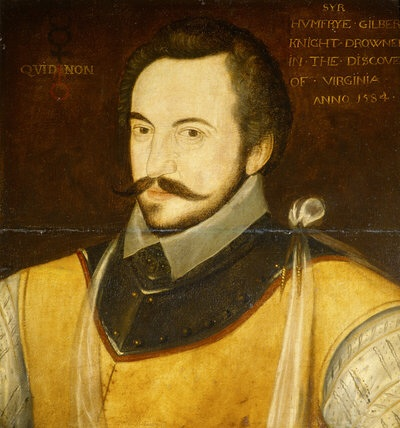
Humphrey Gilbert

- January 7 – Maria of Saxony, Duchess of Pomerania (b. 1515)
- January 22 – Antoinette of Bourbon, French noblewoman (b. 1493)
- January 28 – Pier Francesco Orsini, Italian condottiero and art patron (b. 1523)
- February 27 – Richard Madox, English explorer (b. 1546)
- March 24 – Hubert Goltzius, Dutch Renaissance painter-engraver (b. 1526)
- March 28 – King Magnus of Livonia (b. 1540)
- April – Lucas David, Prussian historian (b. 1503)
- April 17 – Ogasawara Nagatoki, Japanese daimyō (b. 1519)
- May 6 – Zacharias Ursinus, German theologian (b. 1534)
- May 23 – Günther XLI, Count of Schwarzburg-Arnstadt (b. 1529)
- June 6 – Nakagawa Kiyohide, Japanese military commander (b. 1556)
- June 9 – Thomas Radclyffe, 3rd Earl of Sussex, Lord-Lieutenant of Ireland (b. 1525)
- June 14 – Shibata Katsuie, Japanese military commander (b. 1522)
- June – Babullah of Ternate, Sultan of Ternate (b. 1528)
- July 1 – Sakuma Morimasa, Japanese samurai and warlord (beheaded) (b. 1554)
- July 6 – Edmund Grindal, Archbishop of Canterbury (b. 1519)
- August 22 – Marcantonio Maffei, Italian archbishop and cardinal (b. 1521)
- September 9 – Humphrey Gilbert, English explorer (b. c. 1537)
- September 16 – Catherine Jagiellon, queen of John III of Sweden (b. 1526)
- September 27 – Elisabeth Plainacher, Austrian alleged witch (b. 1513)
- October 22 – Louis VI, Elector Palatine (b. 1539)
- November 11 – Gerald FitzGerald, 14th Earl of Desmond, Irish rebel (b. c. 1533)
- November 24 – René de Birague, French cardinal and chancellor (b. 1506)
- December 16 – Ivan Fyodorov, Russian printer
- December 23 – Nicolás Factor, Spanish artist (b. 1520)
- December 31 – Thomas Erastus, Swiss theologian (b. 1524)
- date unknown
  - Giocangga, chieftain of the Jurchens (b. 1526)
  - Andrey Kurbsky, Russian writer (b. 1528)
  - Oda Nobutaka, Japanese samurai (b. 1558)
