= Prince of Ning rebellion =

1519 rebellion in China

- Map showing the Prince of Ning rebellion
| Date | 10 July – 20 August 1519 |
| Location | Northern Jiangxi and southwestern Nanzhili |
| Result | Prince of Ning defeated |

Belligerents
| Prince of Ning | Ming dynasty |

Commanders and leaders
| Zhu Chenhao; Li Shishi; Liu Yangzheng | Wang Yangming; Wu Wending; Zhang Wenjin |

Chinese name
- Traditional Chinese: 寧王之亂
- Simplified Chinese: 宁王之乱
Transcriptions
Standard Mandarin
- Hanyu Pinyin: Níng wáng zhīluàn

The Prince of Ning rebellion was a revolt during the Ming dynasty in China led by Zhu Chenhao, Prince of Ning, against the reigning Zhengde Emperor. It took place in northern Jiangxi and southwestern Nanzhili (present-day northern Jiangxi and southern Anhui) and lasted from 10 July to 20 August 1519. The rebellion was ultimately quelled when the government army, led by Wang Yangming, the grand coordinator of southern Jiangxi, captured the Prince of Ning. The Prince of Ning revolt was one of two princely rebellions during the Zhengde Emperor's reign; it was preceded by the Prince of Anhua rebellion in 1510.

Zhu Chenhao, who was ambitious and eager for power, attempted to gain control of his home province of Jiangxi. With the support of his followers at court, he offered his son as a potential heir to the childless Zhengde Emperor. By the summer of 1519, the Prince of Ning's illegitimacy was exposed to the Emperor, causing the former to fear arrest and openly rebel. His plan was to gather an army and march on Nanjing, the Ming's secondary capital, three days after the uprising began. He aimed to reach Nanjing five days later and officially claim the throne.

The rebels' plan ultimately failed. Grand coordinator Wang Yangming managed to escape the rebels at the start of the rebellion. He then organized resistance in Ji'an, southern Jiangxi, and gathered an army. In an attempt to deceive the rebels, he fed them false information. This caused the prince to delay his march on Nanjing, and he didn't set out from Nanchang until 27 July. Wang Yangming gathered troops from prefects and county magistrates throughout Jiangxi. He then marched on Nanchang and easily captured it on 14 August. The rebel army, which had returned, was defeated by Wang Yangming's forces in a three-day battle on Lake Poyang, north of Nanchang. The prince was captured during this battle.

Upon hearing news of the rebellion, the Zhengde Emperor traveled south from Beijing with his army, arriving in Nanjing only in January 1520. From there, he launched an investigation into the rebellion, which lasted until the end of 1520. The investigation resulted in the execution of the most significant participants and their supporters at court. The prince was allowed to commit suicide. In September 1520, the Emperor returned to Beijing but fell ill on the way and died in the spring of 1521.

== Prince of Ning ==
Provincial capitals of the Ming dynasty, including Nanchang, the residence of the Prince of Ning, and the roads connecting them to the imperial capitals

Zhu Chenhao, Prince of Ning was a member of a branch of China's Ming dynasty. He resided in Nanchang, the capital of the southern province of Jiangxi. Driven by ambition and a desire for power and influence, he sought to gain control and authority. In order to achieve this, he initially resorted to bribery, targeting influential figures such as Liu Jin, who effectively controlled the Beijing government from 1507 to 1510. After Liu Jin's downfall, Zhu Chenhao turned to other allies in the Ming government, including the Emperor's favorite musician, Zang Xian, the Minister of War, Lu Wan, and the commander of the Embroidered Uniform Guard, Qian Ning. Through their support, he was able to establish a personal guard and gain authority over local military garrisons and members of the imperial family.

He also built his own armed force by recruiting "strongmen" from the local area, often known for their involvement in banditry. His actions were met with disapproval from local officials who complained about his behavior, which included seizing land, collecting taxes, and intimidating officials. He even went as far as appropriating imperial privileges, such as calling his residence the imperial palace and referring to himself as a ruler. As time went on, the number of complaints against him increased, both from local officials and from censors in Nanjing, the secondary capital. Despite the fact that princes were typically punished severely for even minor offenses, his behavior was overlooked. He used his power to intimidate local authorities, resorting to violence against anyone who openly opposed him. Those who dared to speak out against him were either killed or falsely accused of crimes by his allies in Beijing and subsequently removed from their positions.

Among the local gentry who supported the prince were Li Shishi (李士實) and Liu Yangzheng (劉養正). Li Shishi was a retired official who, at the peak of his career, served as the head (Note: In the years 1512–1513.) of the Censorate. He was also a renowned military expert, modeling himself after famous warriors such as Jiang Ziya and Zhuge Liang. Additionally, he was related to the prince through the marriage of their children. Although Liu Yangzheng did not pass the civil service examinations, he was highly respected for his literary skills and military knowledge.

In the spring of 1516, he took advantage of the fact that the Zhengde Emperor had no children and bribed Qian Ning and other imperial favorites to bring his eldest son to Beijing as a potential candidate for heir to the throne, but this plan was thwarted by local officials.

He then resorted to armed rebellion. His men recruited refugees, thieves, and bandits from the surrounding area and settled them in the mountains near Nanchang. These armed groups in his service plundered the countryside, providing him with additional income. He also obtained funds by seizing lakes and other public property, exploiting his local dominance in the salt and pepper trade, and selling state rice. He sent large sums of money to tribal chieftains in the mountains of southern Jiangxi and southwestern Fujian, as well as in Guangxi, in order to recruit their armies, known as the dreaded "wolf troops". He also collected materials for the manufacture of weapons, armor, and military supplies. (Note: In 1518, he even possibly acquired Portuguese cannons.)

In 1518, his men attacked the home of Fei Hong, a former grand secretary who was now living in eastern Jiangxi. After Fei filed a complaint, the government sent Sun Sui (Note: Sun Sui (孫燧; 1460–1519), jinshi 1493.) to Nanchang, where he was appointed as the grand coordinator, a military governor responsible for local authorities. His task was to suppress the violence. During this time, Sun Sui also captured a group of bandits and imprisoned them in Nanchang. The prince, however, worried about their potential testimony, ordered his soldiers to storm the city and free the prisoners. The region was also hit by floods, causing the authorities to lose control of the countryside. In the spring of 1519, Sun Sui wrote his seventh report on the prince's betrayal and rebellion, but received no response. All of his reports had been intercepted by the prince's agents. The prince did not openly rebel, instead hoping his son would be named heir, thereby allowing him to legitimately seize the throne.

== Rebellion ==
=== Outbreak and initial moves ===
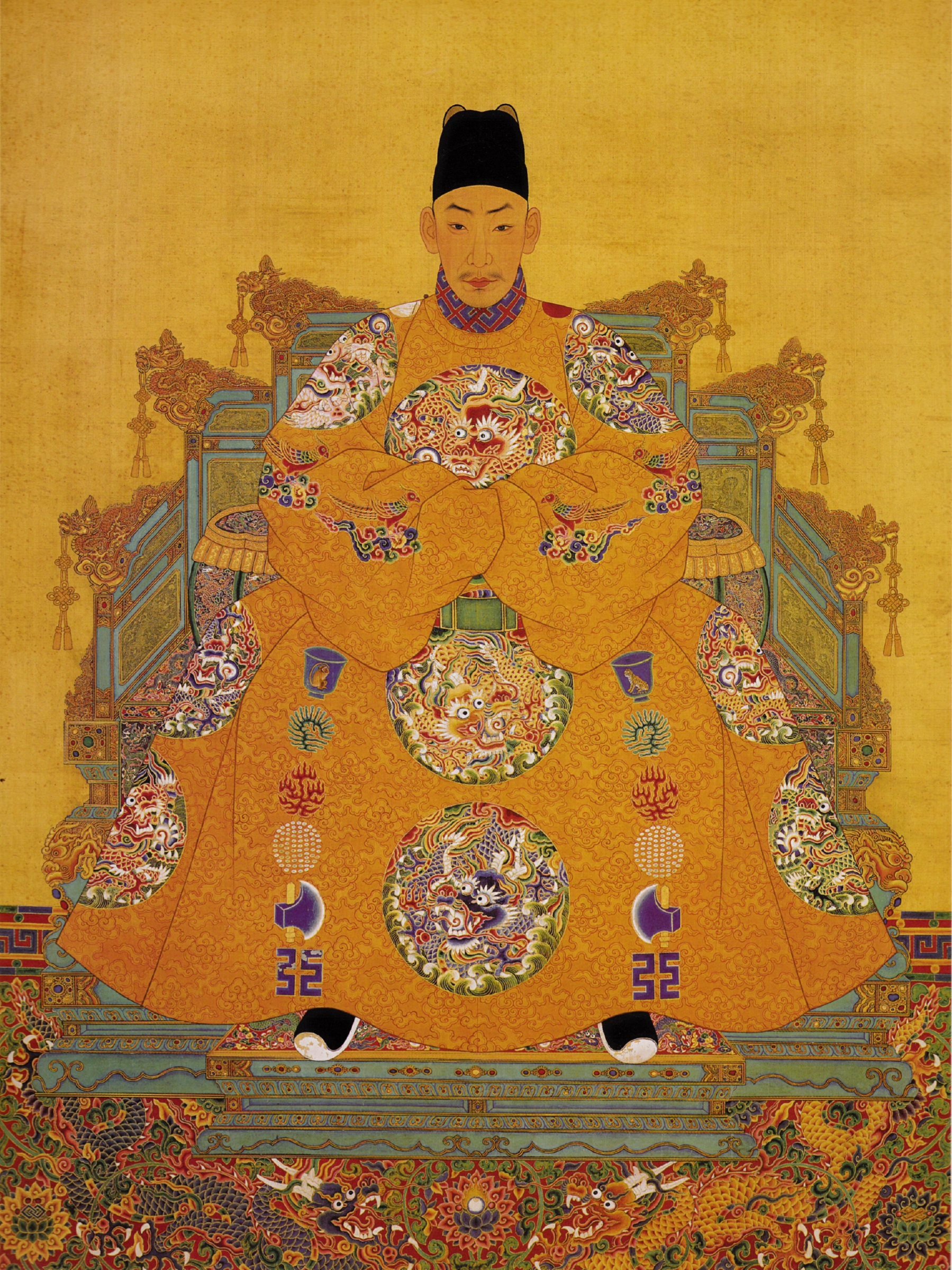
The Zhengde Emperor (r. 1505–1521) on the throne in ceremonial robes

The issue with the prince was not brought to the attention of the Zhengde Emperor until the summer of 1519. During the years 1517–1519, while the Emperor was traveling in the northern borderlands, Qian Ning, who had been working with the prince since 1513, was able to keep the problem hidden from the Emperor. However, upon the Emperor's return to Beijing in the spring of 1519, his favorite general of the Beijing garrison, Jiang Bin, along with his allies, recognized the severity of the situation. This led to an alliance being formed between Jiang Bin, Grand Secretary Yang Tinghe, and high-ranking eunuchs Zhang Yong and Zhang Zhong (張忠) against the prince, Qian Ning, and Zang Xian, ultimately turning the Emperor against them.

The Emperor engaged in a debate with the grand secretaries regarding the prince. In an effort to prevent open conflict, Yang Tinghe suggested sending a group of high-ranking officials to advise the prince to alter his behavior, with the promise of the Emperor pardoning his past transgressions, but the prince's representatives sent a false alarm to Nanchang, claiming that the prince was about to be arrested.

The prince received the news during a birthday banquet and immediately interrupted the festivities. After consulting with his confidants, he made the decision to openly rebel. The following morning, on 10 July 1419, the Nanchang dignitaries who had come to pay their respects to the prince were taken captive by his armed men. The prince then informed them that Zhengde Emperor was an impostor and not a member of the imperial family. He also claimed that the empress dowager had ordered him to be dethroned, but when Sun Sui, grand coordinator of Jiangxi, and Xu Kui (許逵), vice surveillance commissioner of Jiangxi, demanded to see the empress's decree, they were not provided with one. They therefore declared the prince a traitor and were subsequently executed. The remaining officials complied with the prince's demands but were all imprisoned.

Places in Jiangxi Province significant for the Prince of Ning rebellion:
– cities occupied by rebels;
italic – cities attacked by rebels;
– Fengcheng, the city where Wang Yangming learned about the uprising;
– the cities from which Wang Yangming gathered his army.

The prince quickly began gathering an army, making a bold promise to march on Nanjing within three days. He called upon bandits from the mountains and mobilized his troops, sending an advance party of 8,000 men north up the river in 200 ships. This advance party successfully captured two prefectural capitals, Nankang after two days and Jiujiang after another two days. The officials fled and the cities were looted. The rebels also launched attacks on the county towns of both prefectures, with varying degrees of success.

The mobilization of the prince's troops had mixed success. While some military peasants did not immediately join the service, there were also instances of county magistrates killing the prince's emissaries. Despite these challenges, the prince was able to gather a significant force in Nanchang within two days. This included 8,000 men from his personal guard, two Nanchang guard units, and approximately 25,000 armed men made up of bandits and mobilized residents of Nanchang. Additionally, there were 2,000 musicians and vagabonds led by Qin Zhong, as well as smaller groups. In an effort to garner support for the uprising, the prince printed a thousand copies of a proclamation explaining the reasons behind it. He also attempted to win over the people by exempting them from labor and taxes.

The prince had initially intended to depart three days after the uprising commenced, arrive in Nanjing five days later, and officially ascend the throne. However, he did not follow through with this plan. He postponed the start of the march due to concerns raised by Wang Yangming's psychological tactics.

At the time, Wang Yangming held the position of grand coordinator with the title of Vice Censor-in-chief. He was based in Ganzhou Prefecture, located in southern Jiangxi. (Note: In 1516, he was appointed as the grand coordinator. His main responsibility was to suppress banditry in southern Jiangxi and the surrounding regions of Fujian, Huguang, and Guangdong provinces. After two years of fighting, he successfully accomplished this task. Due to his declining health and the need to care for his elderly father, he requested to be relieved of his duties in the first half of 1519, but his request was denied. Wang's supporter, Minister of War Wang Qiong, also opposed his request as he wanted to have a reliable person in Jiangxi to counterbalance the Prince of Ning, whom he did not trust.) His previous military successes had earned him high authority among local officials. By chance, he narrowly avoided arrest at the prince's birthday party as he had made an unexpected stop on his way to Nanchang. It was not until the second day of the rebellion that he learned of its outbreak while in Fengcheng, which was 120 li (approximately 60 km) south of Nanchang. Because Wang was the highest-ranking official in the province, the Prince of Ning sent a thousand men to Fengcheng to capture him.

Wang Yangming quickly retreated south from Fengcheng to the prefectural seat of Ji'an. According to the records of Wang Yangming's disciples, when Wang wanted to sail from Fengcheng to the south, the helmsman refused, stating that it was impossible to sail up the river against the south wind. Wang stood on the bow facing north and appealed to Heaven, asking for assistance in helping his country and changing the direction of the wind. He also expressed that if Heaven favored the rebels and brought misfortune upon the people, he would rather not live any longer. After a while, the wind died down and changed direction, allowing Wang and his entourage to sail south (though not on a large official ship, but on a smaller and faster fishing boat). The prefect of Ji'an Prefecture, Wu Wending (伍文定), became Wang's first deputy. In an attempt to gain popular support, Wang distributed over 1,000 leaflets, wooden tablets, and flags to the people, emphasizing that their fate was tied to their stance towards the rebels. He urged them to remain calm, follow the guidance of local leaders, support loyalists, and enlist brave men in the government army. Wang did not have an army at this point, so he decided to delay and confuse the rebels in order to give the Nanjing authorities and government time to prepare a defense and counterattack. He believed that he could outsmart the inexperienced prince in terms of warfare. To further deceive the rebels, he forged a letter claiming that the government had already ordered the commander of the troops from the southern provinces of Guangxi and Guangdong to march on Nanchang a month and a half prior, and that they were on their way.

The cautious prince, instead of leading his army as planned, remained in Nanchang. He gradually gathered 20,000 well-trained soldiers and over 10,000 bandits, along with various conscripts, giving him a total of 60-70,000 men. These forces were currently pillaging the surrounding counties of Linjiang, Xingan, Fengcheng, and Fengxin. The rebel vanguard advanced down the Yangtze River and began the siege of Anqing on 23 July. Anqing, a prefectural seat located about 270 km from Nanjing, was defended by Prefect Zhang Wenjin (張文錦) and Regional Military Commissar Cui Wen (崔文). Despite having only a small number of soldiers, they were able to mobilize the population and effectively defend the city. In Nanjing, Qiao Yu (1457–1524, Nanjing minister of war) organized the city's defense and even had 300 suspected rebel agents executed.

According to Wang, the prince's hesitation likely weakened the morale of his soldiers, who were eager for battle, progress, and rewards. In order to confuse the rebel leaders, Wang forged a report from the Ministry of War claiming that a large imperial army was being mobilized from all directions to Jiangsu, with even more detachments to follow. He then gave this report to the prince, or allowed the prince's spies to capture the messenger carrying the message. Wang also sent groups pretending to be the vanguard of these forces to the areas where, according to the forged documents, government troops were supposed to arrive. He also fabricated correspondence with the prince's closest confidants, Li Shishi and Liu Yangzheng, in which they appeared to be plotting against the prince. When they eventually advised him to march on Nanjing, the prince suspected them of colluding with Wang Yangming.

=== Siege of Anqing ===
Portrait of Wang Yangming

The prince did not depart for Nanjing until 27 July. He set sail with a force of over 60,000 soldiers divided into five corps, leaving approximately 10,000 troops in Nanchang. On 3 August, his army reached Anqing, which was still under enemy control. Li Shishi urged him to press on to Nanjing, but the prince insisted on capturing the city first. However, the attempt to attack it failed and resulted in significant casualties. The prince was incensed, questioning how his officers could hope to conquer the great city of Nanjing when they were unable to overcome a small prefectural city.

On 9 August, Wang Yangming assembled his own army north of the Linjiang River, located halfway between Ji'an and Nanchang. With over 33,000 troops, (Note: Wang's army consisted of corps of prefects from Ji'an, Ganzhou, Yuanzhou, and Linjiang, subprefecture magistrates from Ruizhou and Fuzhou, county magistrates from Taihe, Xingan, Ningdu, and Wan'an, and a detachment of Regional Military Commissioner Yu En.) he had enough strength to launch an attack on Nanchang. The city's defenses were weak, as most of the rebel forces had already departed with the prince. Two days prior to the main attack, Wang's vanguard launched a surprise attack on a rebel detachment camped outside the city walls, which was guarding the burial grounds. The attack was successful and the rebels were dispersed. The presence of refugees in the city had lowered morale among the defenders. Additionally, Wang's agents within the city were stirring up talk of surrender in anticipation of the upcoming battle, making it easy for Wang Yangming to capture the city on 14 August.

=== Battle of Nanchang ===
On 9 August, news of the danger threatening Nanchang from the south, brought by Wang Yangming, reached the Prince of Ning in Anqing. Despite the advice of his confidants, the prince decided to return south with his main forces. To intercept the prince's returning army, Wang positioned 20,000 soldiers along Lake Poyang.

The battle with the prince's army's vanguard, also numbering 20,000 men, began on 18 August, approximately 20 li (10 km) from Nanchang. Wang's troops successfully repelled the attacks. The following day, the main forces of both armies joined the battle. Under pressure from the rebels, some of Wang's officers began to suggest a retreat, but Wang ordered the execution of any commander whose unit retreated. Everyone fought where they stood, and thousands of soldiers were killed. In addition to strategic tactics, Wang also utilized psychology in the battle. On the first day, he printed 100,000 wooden tablets with a proclamation addressed to the rebels, offering them the chance to save their lives by turning back north and sailing down the Gan River. Many rebels took this offer. On the second day, the rebels' fighting spirit was further undermined by the message on the tablets that the prince had been captured and that it was pointless to continue fighting.

On the third day, Wang's army launched a surprise attack in the morning while the prince was reprimanding his officers. The rebel fleet, which had been anchored in a square formation for the night, was caught off guard by the attack of fire ships. The fire quickly spread to the prince's ships due to strong winds, and Wang's main force then attacked from multiple directions. The prince and many of the rebellion's leaders were captured while trying to flee, (Note: The prince changed into simple clothing and attempted to escape on a fishing boat, but Wang Yangming had already placed reliable soldiers in disguise on the boat to prevent this.) resulting in the crushing defeat of their army. According to Wang Yangming, approximately 3,000 rebels were killed or captured, with an additional 30,000 drowning. In the aftermath of the battle, the prince's wives and concubines also tragically took their own lives by drowning. The remaining rebel forces were pursued and destroyed by government troops over the next two days.

== Aftermath ==
On 7 August, news of the rebellion reached Beijing. The Zhengde Emperor saw this as a clear reason to march south and personally lead an army to suppress it. He left Beijing on 15 September 1519. The next day, the Emperor received a report from Wang Yangming about the prince's defeat and capture, along with a request for the Emperor to return to Beijing. This request was motivated by concerns about potential danger from assassins stationed by the prince along the route south. Despite this warning, the Emperor continued on his journey and arrived in Nanjing in January 1520.

Once in Nanjing, the Emperor sent an army from the north, led by Jiang Bin and the eunuch Zhang Zhong, to Jiangxi. Their plan was to prevent Wang Yangming from achieving victory and stage a mock battle in which the prince would be captured by the Emperor. Wang Yangming refused to hand over the prisoner, suspecting that the Emperor's entourage was collaborating with the prince. On the advice of former Grand Secretary Yang Yiqing, Wang Yangming handed the prisoner over to the eunuch Zhang Yong in Hangzhou, who was in charge of military affairs in the region. Zhang Yong also interceded with the Emperor on behalf of Wang Yangming, who had been falsely accused by Jiang Bin and his associates.

The imperial army was eliminating the prince's allies in Jiangxi. In November 1519, Wang Yangming was sent back to the province as the grand coordinator, and he feared that the presence of the troops would once again incite unrest and potentially worsen the situation. He worked to minimize the damage caused by the troops, earning their respect and obedience.

An investigation into the conspiracy was conducted, led by Zhang Yong, but the purges were not as extensive as they could have been. After the capture of Nanchang, Wang Yangming destroyed most of the records of the prince's social connections with regional and court officials, leaving only the records of the main conspirators. Zang Xian, Qian Ning (in December 1519), Lu Wan (in December 1520), and others accused of collaborating with the rebel prince were arrested, imprisoned, or otherwise punished. The Emperor was particularly angered by the treacherous actions of Qian Ning and Lu Wan, who were close to him. He sentenced the main instigators of the rebellion to death, but allowed the prince to commit suicide.

However, the Emperor's journey south proved to be fatal for him. He stayed in Nanjing until 23 September 1520 before returning north. On the return journey, he fell into the water and became gravely ill. He died in April 1521 without naming a successor.
