= Rebellion of 1510 =

Chinese rebellion (1510–1512)

Date	1510–1512
Location	China
Result	Rebellion defeated

Belligerents
Ming dynasty	"Henan Bandits" "Shandong Bandits"; Minor rebel, bandit, and pirate groups

Commanders and leaders
Zhang Wei; Ma Zhongxi; Lu Wan	"Henan Bandits": Yang Hu †; Liu San ‡‡ Zhao Sui (POW) "Shandong Bandits": Liu Chong †; Liu Chen †; Qi Yanming †

The rebellion of 1510 was a significant uprising in northern China that lasted from 1510 to 1512. It was one of the largest rebellions during the reign of the Ming emperor Zhengde (1505–1521), along with the Prince of Anhua rebellion and the Prince of Ning rebellion.

The rebellion originated in the counties south of Beijing, where the government, led by Liu Jin, attempted to increase military household levies. This led to an increase in desertion and crime in the already impoverished and restless region. By 1510, bandits, led by Yang Hu and the brothers Liu Chong and Liu Chen had formed groups of several thousand. They not only plundered the countryside but also attacked county, subprefect, and prefectural cities in Beizhili and Shandong provinces. The Zhengde Emperor sent troops from the Beijing garrison and called in experienced veterans from the Mongol-Chinese border in 1511. The bandits were pushed south and expanded their raids to the provinces of Henan, Shaanxi, Nanzhili, and Huguang. They declared their intention to overthrow the ruling dynasty. In the summer of 1512, the rebels were finally defeated. Some retreated south across the Yangtze River to Jiangxi, while others went east to Shandong, and the rest went southwest to Wuchang on the Yangtze. From there, they moved downstream, constantly plundering, until they reached the mouth of the Yangtze. There, they were devastated by a typhoon in late August and ultimately defeated by government troops in early September 1512.

== Background ==
Zhang Mao (張茂) was a wealthy and influential figure from Wen'an County near Beijing, during China's Ming dynasty. He was known for his grand residence, which featured imposing towers and extensive fortifications. Another prominent figure from Wen'an was the eunuch Zhang Zhong (張忠), who maintained close connections with his native county and its local elites. Zhang Mao became a client of Zhang Zhong, who later arranged for him to gain an audience with the Zhengde Emperor (r. 1505–1521) in the imperial Leopard Quarter.

In 1508, Zhang Mao robbed Kang Hai (1475–1541), a Hanlin Academy scholar who was also a protégé of the eunuch Liu Jin, the second most powerful figure in the government after the Zhengde Emperor. Kang Hai had brought a large sum of money for Liu Jin (several thousand liang of silver, equivalent to many tens of kilograms), but the local prefect replaced the amount from his own resources and imposed an extraordinary tax in return. Liu only punished the local officials responsible for security, including dismissing the censor Ning Gao (甯杲, jinshi 1496). Zhang Zhong then attempted to establish friendly relations between Zhang Mao and the officers who were prosecuting him as a bandit.

In the summer of 1509, the security situation south of Beijing deteriorated due to Liu Jin's attempts to increase military household levies. This led to desertions and deserters pillaging the countryside in large numbers. To address this issue, the government assigned four censors including Ning Gao to eliminate bandits. Ning was responsible for Shuntian and Baoding prefectures and had a personal army of 1,700 men at his disposal. (Note: Such personal armed groups were typical for high-ranking officials. These armies were hired from the same circles from which bandits were recruited, and many armed men smoothly transitioned between serving the law and engaging in crime.) He used force and intimidation to fight the bandits and was even rumored to have eaten the hearts of captured bandit leaders. In an attempt to eliminate Zhang Mao and gain favor with Liu Jin, Ning suddenly ambushed Zhang, captured his headquarters, and took him to Beijing. Zhang Mao's aides, Yang Hu (楊虎; 'Tiger Yang') and the brothers Liu Chong (劉寵, also called Liu the Sixth 劉六) and Liu Chen (劉宸, also called Liu the Seventh 劉七) sought help from Zhang Zhong, but he and another eunuch demanded 20,000 liang (746 kg) of silver. The aides were unable to collect this sum, and Zhang Mao was executed.

The magistrate of Zhuozhou then hired the two Liu brothers to hunt down bandits. Although they excelled at catching criminals, they continued to engage in robbery. Ning Gao continued to pursue them, using spies and leaflets, burning down their houses, imprisoning their wives and children, and destroying their family burial grounds. They were forced to resort to robbery for survival. Yang Hu also engaged in both banditry and service to the authorities, initially serving in Ning's guard before eventually working for the office fighting organized crime in Tianjin.

== Rebellion ==
In the autumn of 1510, following Liu Jin's downfall, Ning Gao also lost his position and his private army disbanded. Many of his soldiers joined the Liu brothers, increasing their power. However, the Lius continued to negotiate with the authorities for a peaceful coexistence. They were granted a pardon at the end of the year, but their illegal activities such as robbery continued. The Beijing area was plagued by multiple groups of bandits, led by figures such as the Liu brothers, Qi Yanming (齊彥名), and Gu Zimei (顧子美). These bandits also extended their activities to Shandong. In March 1511, the government, concerned about the situation, began to call upon troops from Beijing and Mongol soldiers from Hejian and Dingzhou to combat the bandits.

In the spring of 1511, the bandits' center of operations shifted from Shandong back to Beizhili, as well as to Nanzhili, northeastern Henan, and northern Huguang. They operated in highly mobile groups of several thousand, not only plundering the countryside but also attacking cities. During their attacks, they would occupy cities for days and weeks, freeing prisoners and seizing state supplies from granaries. The authorities eventually grouped the various cooperating groups into the "Henan Bandits" under Yang Hu and the "Shandong Bandits" under the Liu brothers.

The Emperor assigned the task of suppressing the rebels to two individuals: Zhang Wei (張偉), Count of Huai'an (d. 1535), and Left Censor-in-chief Ma Zhongxi (馬中錫; 1446–1512). They were given a force of 2,000 soldiers and granted almost unlimited powers. Meanwhile, the rebels continued their attacks in Shandong, targeting 19 county and subprefecture cities, as well as Beizhili and Henan. One particularly humiliating incident for the authorities was the attack on the Confucius temple in Qufu and the estates of Confucius' descendants in the surrounding area. By the summer of 1511, the rebels had spread to Beizhili, northern Huguang, eastern Shanxi, and northern Henan. In early August, Yang Hu and Liu Chong met in Wen'an, where they captured a member of the local gentry named Zhao Sui (趙鐩), also known as Zhao the Madman (趙風子). Zhao then recruited 500 men and joined the rebels.

Ma Zhongxi attempted to negotiate with the rebels, but his efforts were unsuccessful. Although the accounts vary in detail, they generally agree that Ma failed to reach a settlement with the rebels because he lacked the authority and political backing needed to offer them meaningful security after their revolt. In August 1511, both he and Zhang Wei were dismissed. (Note: Zhang Wei was later pardoned, but Ma Zhongxi died in prison.) The assistant minister of war Lu Wan (陸完; 1458–1526), took over Ma's responsibilities. As a pragmatist, Lu Wan maintained good relations with his superiors.

In September 1511, the government recalled troops from the border to push the rebels out of the Beijing area and into Shandong. However, the rebels were able to achieve several victories, and local bandits from Henan and Shandong joined Yang Hu and Zhao Sui. Yang declared himself "Great Prince Yang". In November 1511, the rebels set fire to over 1,200 boats on the Grand Canal at Jining. During the same month, Yang was killed in a skirmish with local troops at Bozhou. He was replaced by Liu San (劉三; 'Liu the Third'). Liu San and Zhao Sui defeated a large force of government troops, resulting in the deaths of 1,500 soldiers. Towards the end of 1511, the Liu brothers attacked Bazhou, which was located less than 40 miles (65 km) south of Beijing. This caused great concern and alarm within the government.

In January 1512, the rebels were forced to retreat to Henan, as they were being pursued by Lu Wan's army. The majority of the fighting during this time occurred in central and southern Henan, as well as in northern Henan, parts of Jiangxi, and Nanzhili. The "Henan Bandits", led by Zhao Sui and Liu San, openly declared their intention to overthrow the Ming, and considered attacking Kaifeng, the capital of Henan Province. The rebel commanders strictly prohibited their men from harming innocent civilians and established a more organized structure. This included dividing their estimated 130,000 soldiers into 28 brigades, each with its own commander and flag. In late 1511, the rebels launched attacks on county towns located on the border of Henan and Huguang. Some towns were able to defend themselves, while others resorted to bribery in order to protect themselves from the rebels. In some cases, the rebels were able to pay off the defenders of the cities, allowing them to have free rein in both the cities and the surrounding countryside. Despite their use of imperial rhetoric, the rebels were not very successful in their endeavors. This was especially true in the borderlands of Huguang and Henan, where the authorities had traditionally had weak control. (Note: In 1506, an official estimated that on the border of Sichuan, Henan, and Huguang, there lived three-quarters of a million "unsettled" people, beyond the control of the state.) On the other hand, the Liu brothers, who operated closer to the economically developed Jiangnan, formed alliances with local bandits and pirates, which proved to be more successful for them.

In January 1512, the government implemented new measures to combat the rebellion. They deployed soldiers from the capital to protect key centers, while border units were tasked with attacking the rebels. Local conscripts and militia were also enlisted to assist in the effort. Additionally, in February, the Emperor summoned five thousand native warriors from southern Huguang, who were known for their tenacity but also for their brutal treatment of the population.

In February and March 1512, the Liu brothers and Qi Yanming captured several locations in the Huaibei region. Located north of the Huai River, Huaibei had been plagued by conflict since the 12th century. One of their main targets was the strategically important city of Pizhou, located on the Grand Canal.

In March–April 1512, Liu San and Zhao Sui launched attacks on more than two dozen cities in southeastern Henan, northeastern Huguang, and southwestern Nanzhi. Their success was short-lived as they lost the initiative in April due to unsuccessful fighting and disastrous river crossing attempts, which weakened their forces. By May, they were only able to gather 10,000 men for battle and were constantly pursued by imperial border guards, regular army, native troops, and militia. In June, Ming forces defeated the "Henan Bandits" in a series of battles in northern Huguang, eastern Henan, and Nanzhi. Zhao attempted to escape with two companions disguised as Buddhist monks, but was eventually captured on 30 June 1512 in a massive manhunt. Liu San was wounded in a battle while being pursued by the Ming forces and subsequently hanged himself.

Meanwhile, the Liu brothers and Qi Yanming moved south to Huguang, where they "changed from horses to boats" and raided Hankou. They encountered strong storms, and Liu Chong drowned on 12 June 1512. Qi and Liu Chen then sailed down the Yangtze River with eight hundred men and thirteen ships, attacking cities from Huangzhou to Yizhen. They sought support from local river pirates, as well as salt and tea smugglers, who operated in bands of several hundred or more. In a surprise attack on Guazhou in June 1512, the rebels burned the warships and captured a large quantity of weapons. Liu Chen then settled on Langshan (Wolf Hill) near Tongzhou on the north bank of the Yangtze near its mouth. From there, he raided as far as the outskirts of Nanjing. On 28 August, the rebels' attack on Tongzhou failed, and the following night, an unprecedentedly destructive typhoon destroyed their fleet. They attempted to regroup on Langshan, but were attacked by the government army and massacred on 7 September 1512. Qi and Liu Chen died while fleeing in the waters of the Yangtze. The suppression of the rebellion reduced the threat to the capital's security and supply, but banditry troubled Jiangxi, Henan, and central Sichuan for a decade.
