= Palazzo Bernardo e Giuseppe De Franchi =

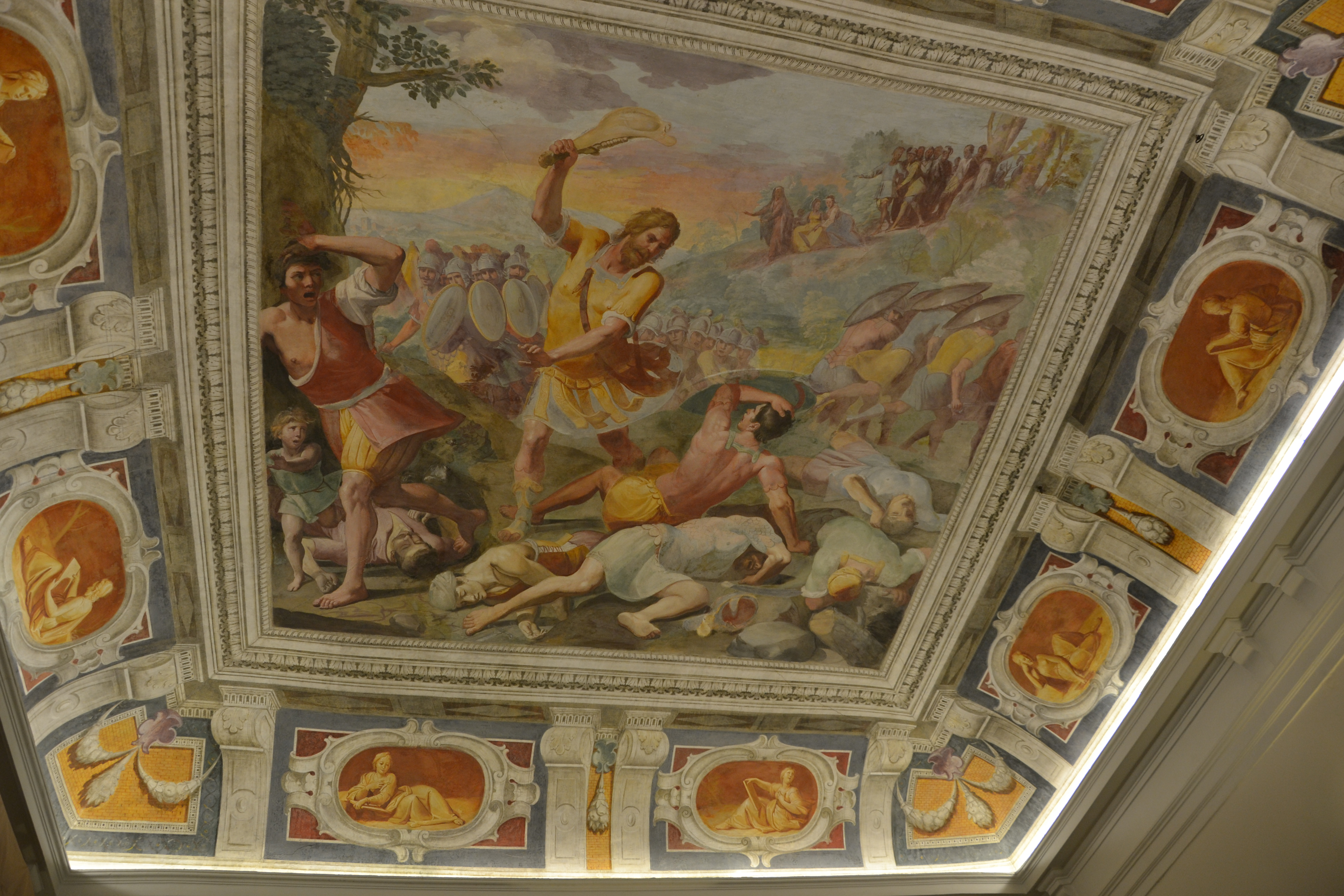
- Vault frescoed by Fiasella
- Interactive map of the Palazzo Bernardo e Giuseppe De Franchi area

General information
- Status: In use
- Type: Palace
- Architectural style: Mannerist
- Location: Genoa, Italy, 2, Piazza della Posta Vecchia
- Coordinates: 44.410392°N 8.931011°E
- Current tenants: housing/offices (former headquarters of the Italian Socialist Party)
- Construction started: 16th century
- Completed: 16th century

The palazzo Bernardo e Giuseppe De Franchi Toso is a building located in Piazza della Posta Vecchia at number 2 in historic centre of Genoa. The building was included in the list of palaces inscribed in the Rolli di Genova. It was an important seat of the Italian Socialist Party from 1952 to 2003.

== History and description ==
The palace stands on part of a block formerly belonging to the Spinola and the Grimaldi (family) then rebuilt to house the De Franchi Toso. The various properties in the area were acquired by Bernardo and Giuseppe De Franchi Toso, who in 1563 ordered the construction of the palace that was to house Gerolamo De Franchi Toso — the latter doge of the Republic of Genoa in the two-year period 1581—1583 — and belonged to the family until 1818. The De Franchi family partially maintained the pre-existing perimeter walls, in particular on the Spinola alley where there are still blocks of squared stone from the late medieval portico that had been filled in during the 16th century.

The building, with 19th-century superelevations, has a portal in doric style, which, through the atrium partitioned by a workshop, leads onto a large loggia courtyard.

With the bombing of World War II, the palace suffered serious damage to its interior decorations. Today, it is possible to admire two monumental halls with frescoes by Bernardo Castello, Scenes from Jerusalem Delivered, and by Domenico Fiasella, Samson Exterminating the Philistines. The frescoes in the Castle were executed in the first decade of the 17th century, after the painter, who had his studio in the same Piazza della Posta, had illustrated the Genoese edition of the Gerusalem Delivered of 1590, having been in Ferrara shortly before to meet the Tasso. In the centre of the salon is depicted the siege of Jerusalem with the help of the siege tower, and in the six surrounding panels the stories of Godfrey of Bouillon. On the ceiling of the other hall, however, Fiasella depicts the famous biblical episode of Samson defeating the Philistines armed only with a donkey's jaw.

Following a period when the palace was owned by Count Amedeo Umberto Alberti, its two noble floors later became the provincial headquarters of the Italian Socialist Party from 1952 to 2003, when ownership of the building's noble floors was sold for just under 1 billion lira to private individuals.
