= Davide Vacca =

Doge of the Republic of Genoa

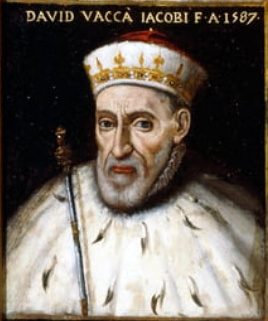

76th Doge of the Republic of Genoa
- In office 14 November 1587 – 14 November 1589
- Preceded by: Ambrogio Di Negro
- Succeeded by: Battista Negrone

Personal details
- Born: 1518 Genoa, Republic of Genoa
- Died: 1607 (aged 88–89) Genoa, Republic of Genoa

Davide Vacca (Genoa, 1518 - Genoa, 1607) was the 76th Doge of the Republic of Genoa.

== Biography ==
A well-known notary and graduate in civil and canon law, Davide Vacca was one of the first members of the "Venerandum Collegium Dominorum Jurisperitorum et Judicum civitatis Januae". He had excellent relations with the Doria family and in particular friendly relations with the famous admiral Andrea Doria who favored the entry of his family into the Albergo of the Genoese nobility on the occasion of the state reform of 1528. His name was chosen by the Grand Council for the leadership of the Republic on 14 November 1587, the thirty-first in biennial succession and the seventy-sixth in republican history. Among the important events of Vacca's doge's mandate were the constant disagreements and contrasts with the neighboring Duchy of Savoy in territorial matters. He ended his government on 14 November 1589, which was presumably followed by the office of perpetual attorney and other representative duties. Vacca died in Genoa in 1607.

== See also ==
- Republic of Genoa
- Doge of Genoa

== Sources ==
- Sergio Buonadonna and Mario Marcenaro, Rosso doge: I dogi della Repubblica di Genova dal 1339 al 1797 (De Ferrari Editore, 2000)
