= Battista Negrone =

Doge of the Republic of Genoa

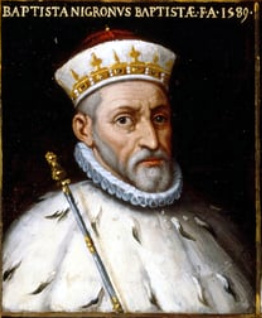

77th Doge of the Republic of Genoa
- In office November 20, 1589 – November 15, 1591
- Preceded by: Davide Vacca
- Succeeded by: Giovanni Agostino Giustiniani Campi

Personal details
- Born: 1530 Genoa, Republic of Genoa
- Died: 1592 (aged 61–62) Genoa, Republic of Genoa

Battista Negrone (Genoa, 1530 - Genoa, January 1592) was the 77th Doge of the Republic of Genoa.

== Biography ==
Part of that nobility considered "old", he was elected to the dogal title on 20 November 1589, the thirty-second in biennial succession and the seventy-seventh in history. Negrone ended his mandate on November 15, 1591 preferring to take care of his financial activities rather than a subsequent political career or post-state government. Battista Negrone died in Genoa in January 1592.

== See also ==
- Republic of Genoa
- Doge of Genoa
