= Ambrogio Di Negro =

Doge of the Republic of Genoa

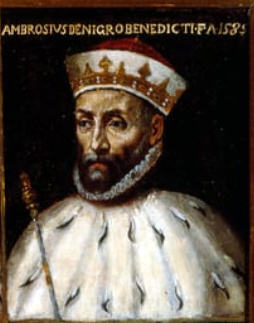

75th Doge of the Republic of Genoa
- In office November 8, 1585 – November 13, 1587
- Preceded by: Gerolamo Chiavari
- Succeeded by: Davide Vacca

Personal details
- Born: 1519 Genoa, Republic of Genoa
- Died: August 1601 (aged 81–82) Genoa, Republic of Genoa

Ambrogio Di Negro (Genoa, 1519 - Genoa, August 1601) was the 75th Doge of the Republic of Genoa.

== Biography ==
According to the writings of the historians of the time, Ambrogio Di Negro's dogato was not easy for the continuous noble struggles, made of crime, and internal political problems, so much so that several times the Genoese government was called to revise and reform criminal justice; maneuvers that then, in fact, were minimally implemented or with not really significant results. In various memoirs, Ambrogio Di Negro's personality is described as "haughty and superb", a change of character perhaps explainable in the difficult events of his two-year term. After the end of his mandate as Doge, he preferred to retire from Genoese political life. Di Negro died in Genoa in August 1601.

== See also ==
- Republic of Genoa
- Doge of Genoa
