= Gerolamo Chiavari =

Doge of the Republic of Genoa

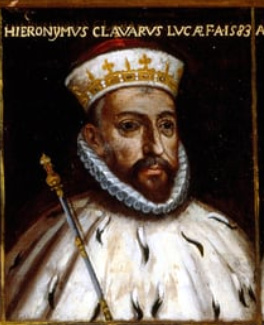

74th Doge of the Republic of Genoa
- In office November 4, 1583 – November 4, 1585
- Preceded by: Gerolamo De Franchi Toso
- Succeeded by: Ambrogio Di Negro

Personal details
- Born: 1521 Genoa, Republic of Genoa
- Died: 1586 (aged 64–65) Genoa, Republic of Genoa

Gerolamo Chiavari (1521–1586) was the 74th doge of the Republic of Genoa.

== Biography ==
Like the mandate of his predecessor, the biennial government of the doge Gerolamo Chiavari also severely affected the banditry prevailing in the city and in the rest of the republican territory. A phenomenon that reached its historical minimum thanks to the constant commitment of Giorgio Centurione who for his efforts was exempted, as well as the members of his family, from the Senate from the payment of taxes in the future. Chiavari ended his mandate on November 4, 1585 and presumably did not have time to cover further state commitments as he died in Genoa in the early months of 1586.

== See also ==
- Republic of Genoa
- Doge of Genoa
