= Wang Qiong =

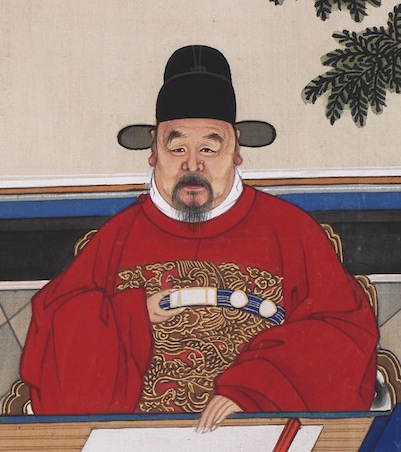
- Wang Qiong wearing informal dress of high-ranking officials

Minister of Revenue
- In office 1513–1515
- Monarch: Zhengde Emperor

Minister of War
- In office 1515–1520
- Monarch: Zhengde Emperor

Minister of Personnel
- In office 1520–1521
- Monarch: Zhengde Emperor

Minister of Personnel
- In office 1531–1532
- Monarch: Jiajing Emperor

Personal details
- Born: 1459 Taiyuan, Shanxi
- Died: 1532 (aged 72–73) Beijing

Wang Qiong (simplified Chinese: 王琼; traditional Chinese: 王瓊; Wade–Giles: Wang Ch'iung; 1459–1532), courtesy name Dehua (德華), pseudonym Jinxi (晉溪), was a Chinese statesman and general during the Ming dynasty.

== Biography ==
Wang Qiong was born in a family in which several members were officials. He passed the final stages of the imperial exams and received his Jinshi (進士) degree in 1484 during the reign of Chenghua Emperor. He started his career in the Ministry of Works and gained extensive experience in flood control.

In 1506, Wang was appointed by Zhengde Emperor Governor-General of Canal Transportation, later the Grand coordinator and provincial governor of Shuntian and Baoding. He eventually became Minister of Revenue and Minister of War of the Ming Dynasty during the following years. Wang Qiong strongly recommended Wang Yangming's appointment as Grand Coordinator for southern Jiangxi, which was essential to the suppression of the Prince of Ning rebellion in 1519.
