= Zhu Chenhao =

Chinese prince and rebel (died 1521)

Zhu Chenhao 朱宸濠
- Prince of Ning
- Born: Nanchang, Jiangxi
- Died: 13 January 1521; Tongzhou (present-day Tongzhou District, Beijing)
- Spouse: Lady Lou
- House: Zhu
- Father: Zhu Jinjun

Chinese name
- Chinese: 朱宸濠
Transcriptions
Standard Mandarin
- Hanyu Pinyin: Zhū Chénháo

Zhu Chenhao (died 13 January 1521) was a prince of the Ming dynasty of China, being a fifth-generation descendant of Zhu Quan, the seventeenth son of the founder of the dynasty, the Hongwu Emperor. In 1499, he inherited the title of Prince of Ning and resided in Nanchang, the capital of Jiangxi. In July 1519, he started a rebellion by declaring the then Zhengde Emperor illegitimate and marching on Nanjing. Wang Yangming, governor of southern Jiangxi, quickly raised an army and occupied Nanchang. In August 1519, he crushed the rebel army, forcing them to retreat to the south. During the battle, Zhu Chenhao was captured and sentenced to execution, but the Emperor later commuted his sentence to suicide.

== Background and early life ==
Provincial capitals of the Ming dynasty, including Nanchang, the residence of the Prince of Ning, and the roads connecting them to the imperial capitals

Zhu Chenhao was the fifth-generation descendant of Zhu Quan, the first Prince of Ning and the seventeenth son of the Hongwu Emperor, the founder of China's Ming dynasty. Zhu Quan was a skilled general, stationed in the frontier town of Daning north of the Great Wall. During the Jingnan campaign (1399–1402), his elder brother, the rebel prince Zhu Di (later the Yongle Emperor), relocated him to Beijing due to concerns about his loyalty. Zhu Quan was later moved again to Nanchang in the southern province of Jiangxi, where the Princes of Ning resided for the remainder of the 15th century. During the Tianshun era (1457–1464), the prince lost the right to maintain his guard. Zhu Chenhao's father was Zhu Jinjun (朱覲鈞; 1449–1497), who was the Prince of Ning (寧王) from 1494 until his death in 1497. Zhu Chenhao was initially granted the title of Prince of Shanggao (上高王) before succeeding as Prince of Ning in 1499, two years after his father's death.

Zhu Chenhao was not a warrior; on the contrary, he enjoyed a life of luxury and had some literary talents. His main focus was on social advancement and he was driven by ambition. In his pursuit of military strength, he first aimed to rebuild his guard and secure the necessary funds. He achieved this in 1507 by bribing the eunuch Liu Jin, who effectively controlled the Beijing government at the time, despite opposition from the Ministry of War. After Liu Jin's downfall in 1510, Zhu Chenhao lost his soldiers once again.

In 1514, Zhu Chenhao once again requested for troops, this time with the backing of Lu Wan (1458–1526), the new Minister of War since December 1513 and a long-time political ally. (Note: Zhu Chenhao had met Lu Wan years earlier while Lu was the judicial intendant of Guangxi. The prince later became Lu's patron.) His request was thwarted by Grand Secretary Fei Hong (1468–1535), who was aware of the prince's intentions. Despite this obstacle, the prince managed to gain support from Qian Ning, the commander of the imperial guard, Zang Xian (臧賢), the Zhengde Emperor's favorite musician, and several influential eunuchs. Finally, in April 1514, he was granted permission to proceed with his plans.

The local authorities had been voicing their complaints about the prince's behavior, which included seizing land, imposing taxes, and intimidating officials. In January 1514, even the Nanjing censors officially lodged a complaint to Beijing, but their efforts were in vain. In April 1514, a commissioner tasked with fighting bandits in Jiangxi reported that the root of the problem was the prince himself. He was accused of both employing bandits and driving people off their land, thus creating more bandits. Lu Wan dismissed the report as slanderous and it was disregarded.

The minister even supported the prince's requests for authority over local garrisons and members of the imperial family. The Zhengde Emperor was pleased with the prince's initiative and approved his requests, while dismissing the officials' criticism as slander. The prince then began to hire soldiers and bandits, and even started to act like a monarch, referring to himself as an emperor. Despite the fact that princes were typically punished severely for even minor offenses, Zhu Chenhao's behavior was overlooked.

In his pursuit of power, Zhu Chenhao attempted a non-violent approach by exploiting the Emperor's lack of an heir and promoting his own son as the successor to the throne. In the spring of 1516, Zhu Chenhao resorted to bribery, persuading Qian and other influential members of the Emperor's entourage to bring his eldest son to Beijing as a potential heir, but his efforts proved to be fruitless.

In May 1517, a group of eunuchs from Zhu Chenhao's household went to Beijing to report on his illegal activities. However, Qian Ning imprisoned them. The prince then focused on armed rebellion. With his support, bandits plundered the countryside and intimidated the authorities. They even attacked the household of former Grand Secretary Fei Hong, who was now living in eastern Jiangxi. Following Fei's complaint, the government sent Sun Sui (孫燧) (Note: Sun Sui, a native of Yuyao, obtained the jinshi degree in 1493. He served as a secretary of the Ministry of Justice, and later was promoted to the position of director. During the Zhengde era, he served as Right Provincial Administration Commissioner of Henan before being transferred to Jiangxi.) to Nanchang, where he was appointed governor and charged with suppressing violence. In 1518, Sun captured several bandits and imprisoned them in Nanchang. Fearing their statements, the prince ordered his men to attack the city and free the prisoners, causing the authorities to lose control over the countryside. In the spring of 1519, Sun wrote yet another report about the prince's betrayal and rebellion, but received no response. The prince had refrained from open rebellion thus far, hoping that the childless Emperor would appoint his son as heir to the throne.

== Rebellion ==
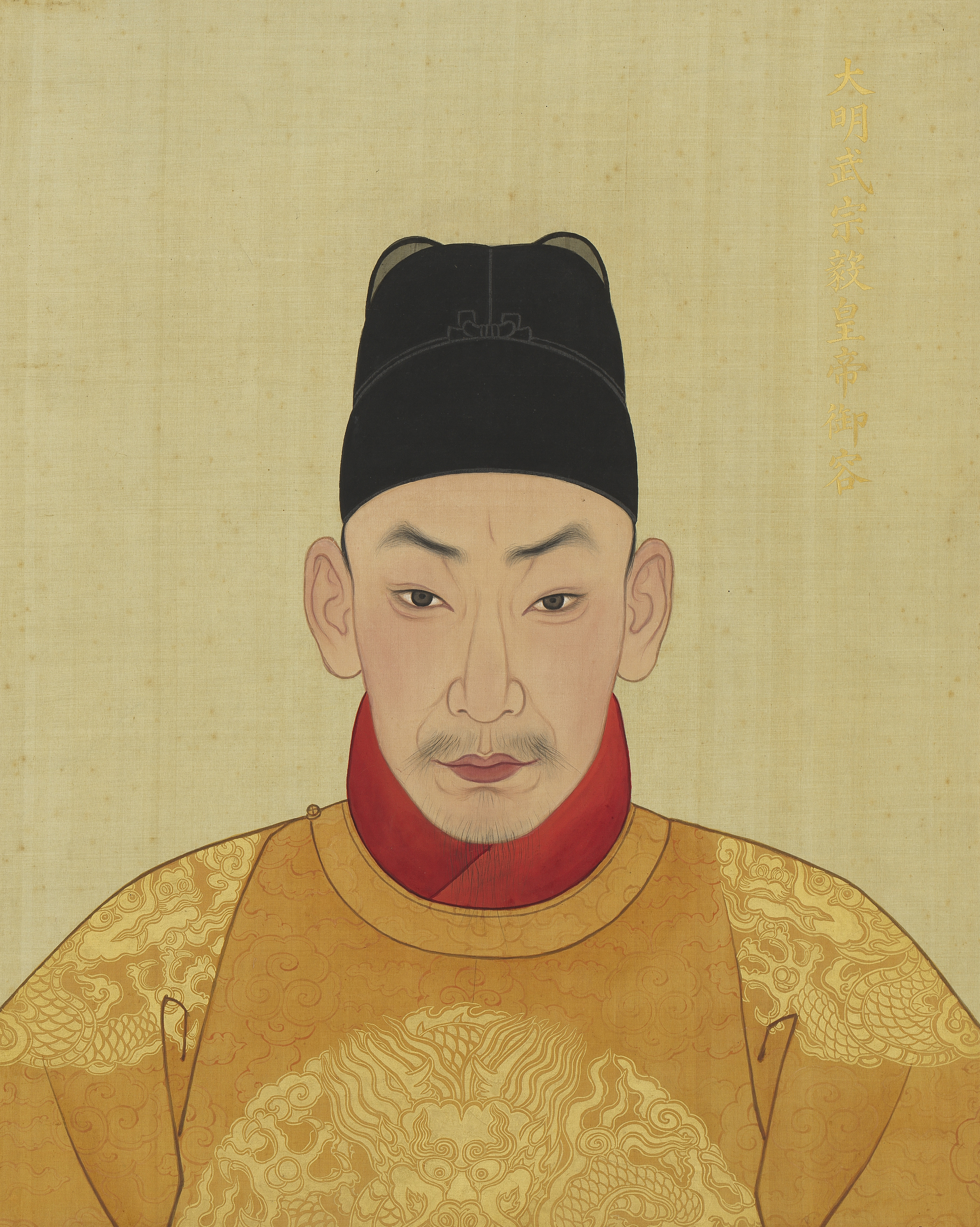
Portrait of the Zhengde Emperor

The Zhengde Emperor only became aware of Zhu Chenhao's revolt in the summer of 1519. It was during this time that his favorite general, Jiang Bin, and the eunuch Zhang Yong convinced him of the prince's and Qian Ning's misconduct. The prince had been informed by his spies in Beijing about unfavorable developments, and on 10 July 1519, he openly rebelled in Nanchang. He declared that the Zhengde Emperor was an impostor and not a member of the imperial family, and that the Empress had ordered his dethronement, but when the officials present, led by Governor Sun Sui, demanded to see the Empress's decree, they were not given one. They therefore declared the prince a traitor and were subsequently executed.

The prince led his army north from Nanchang and reached Jiujiang on 13 July. From there, they began the siege of Anqing, a prefectural seat located 150 miles from Nanjing, on 23 July. However, the majority of the prince's forces did not depart until 26 July.

On 14 July, Wang Yangming, the governor of southern Jiangxi, was informed of the rebellion and quickly began assembling his own army. He also spread false information that a large imperial army had been dispatched from Beijing.

On 9 August, the prince's main forces finally arrived at Anqing, but their attempt to capture the city failed and resulted in heavy losses. The prince was enraged, questioning how such an army could hope to conquer Nanjing. Wang Yangming gathered his own army and marched towards Nanchang. Due to the majority of the prince's forces having withdrawn to the north, the city was weakly defended, and on 14 August, Wang successfully occupied it. The prince then returned south with his main forces, but on 20 August, in the river battle at Lake Poyang, Wang's army emerged victorious and captured the prince.

== Death ==
In September 1519, the Emperor departed from Beijing and headed south. He arrived in Nanjing in mid-January 1520 and stayed there for eight months. The troops that accompanied the Emperor from the north, under the command of his confidants, Jiang Bin and Zhang Yong, were sent to Jiangxi to suppress the rebellion. Jiang and Zhang attempted to sabotage Wang's success by planning a fake battle in which the prince would be "captured" by the Emperor. Wang refused to participate and instead handed over the captives to Zhang, who was in charge of military affairs in Hangzhou.

Zhu Chenhao was stripped of all his ranks and titles as early as 1519, but the decision on his fate was not made until 13 January 1521, when the Emperor allowed him to commit suicide. His body was burned as punishment.

== Notes ==
Zhu Chenhao House of Zhu Born: 1 July 1476 Died: 13 January 1521
Chinese royalty
Preceded by Zhu Jinjun	Prince of Ning; 1499–1519	Title abolished
