= Gerolamo De Franchi Toso (1522–1586) =

Doge of the Republic of Genoa

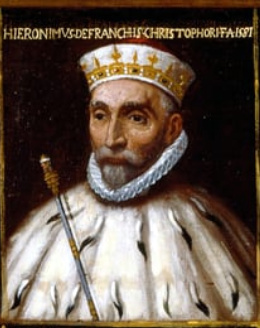

73rd Doge of the Republic of Genoa
- In office 21 October 1581 – 21 October 1583
- Preceded by: Nicolò Doria
- Succeeded by: Gerolamo Chiavari

Personal details
- Born: 1522 Genoa, Republic of Genoa
- Died: 1586 (aged 63–64) Genoa, Republic of Genoa

Gerolamo De Franchi Toso (Genoa, 1522 - Genoa, 1586) was the 73rd Doge of the Republic of Genoa.

== Biography ==
De Franchi Toso, considered a member of the "new" nobility in the Republic, was elected to the dogal title on 21 October 1581, the twenty-eighth in two-year succession and the seventy-third in republican history. His mandate was marked by the fight against banditry and, in foreign policy, the first controversies with the neighboring Duchy of Savoy which, over time, would result in a war between the two powers. He also worked in the local religious field with his assent for the construction of a new church in the historic center of Genoa. He ceased office on 21 October 1583. Probably appointed perpetual procurator after the favorable vote of the supreme trade unions. The former Doge died in Genoa during 1586.

== See also ==
- Republic of Genoa
- Doge of Genoa
