= Jiang Bin (Ming dynasty) =

Chinese general (died 1521)

Jiang Bin (Note: Chinese: 江彬; pinyin: Jiāng Bīn) (died 11 July 1521) was a Ming dynasty officer and a favorite of the Zhengde Emperor. He rose to become one of the most influential men in Ming China, starting from 1512. After the Zhengde Emperor's death in 1521, Jiang's attempts to gain power were unsuccessful. The new government, led by Grand Secretary Yang Tinghe, ultimately executed him.

== Biography ==
Jiang Bin was a Ming dynasty cavalry officer from a military household who was assigned to the garrison at Xuanfu (present-day Xuanhua, Hebei, China). He was known for his exceptional archery skills. In 1511, he proved his bravery in battles against rebels in Nanzhili. Despite being hit by three arrows, including one in the ear, Jiang continued to fight. In 1512, he was able to secure an audience with the Zhengde Emperor through a bribe to Qian Ning. The Emperor was impressed by Jiang's strength, imposing presence, and his wealth of exciting battle stories. Qian, who initially supported Jiang, turned against him when he realized that he was losing influence.

Jiang proposed a reform to the Emperor, suggesting a rotation of units. He believed that the garrison in the capital lacked combat experience and was unable to effectively fight against rebels. His proposal was to bring experienced units from the borderlands to Beijing and send soldiers from the capital to the borders to gain experience. Despite opposition from Grand Secretary Li Dongyang, the Emperor implemented the reform and placed Jiang in charge of the troops.

In 1516, the Zhengde Emperor, tired of constant criticism from officials, began to consider the idea of going to Xuanfu. Jiang, in an attempt to distance the Zhengde Emperor from Qian, convinced the Emperor that Xuanfu had better musicians and women, and that he would have real skirmishes with the Mongols in the borderlands instead of simulated battles in Beijing. In the autumn of 1517, the Emperor traveled to the borderlands and stayed there for two years. Jiang served as his first adjutant, and for his role in a successful battle with the Mongols in October 1517, he was granted the title of count, specifically Count of Pinglu (平虜伯; Pinglu bo).

In the years 1519–1521, Jiang accompanied the Emperor on his journey to Nanjing in the south. Upon their return to Beijing, the Emperor died without naming a successor. Jiang saw this as an opportunity to seize the imperial city and place the Prince of Dai, a distant relative of the Emperor, on the throne. His first step was to forge a decree on 15 April, declaring himself in charge of the border troops stationed in Beijing, but the plan was unsuccessful as he was not present when the Emperor died on 20 April. Instead, two eunuchs recorded the Emperor's supposed last words, stating that his mother, Empress Dowager Zhang, and the grand secretaries would rule the empire. Grand Secretary Yang Tinghe then proposed that the Emperor's closest cousin, thirteen-year-old Zhu Houcong, Prince of Xing, be named as the new emperor. He gained the support of Lady Zhang and the government for this decision.

However, Jiang still had an army at his disposal. He returned to the Forbidden City on 22 April, when Yang informed him of the decree to return the border troops from Beijing to the border, effectively stripping him of his main support. Despite persuasion from his allies to take action, Jiang hesitated, and was ultimately arrested on 24 April. Yang obtained consent for his arrest from the eunuch-heads of the Directorate of Ceremonial—Wei Bin (魏彬) and Zhang Rui (張銳)—in exchange for the immunity of the other eunuchs—only Jiang's allies among the officers were also arrested. Jiang's fortune, consisting of 70 chests of gold, 2,200 chests of silver, and other valuables, was confiscated and he was subsequently executed.
