= Qian Ning =

Chinese general (died 1521)

Qian Ning (Note: simplified Chinese: 钱宁; traditional Chinese: 錢寧; pinyin: Qián Níng) (died 25 June 1521) was a Chinese general and a favorite of the Zhengde Emperor of China's Ming dynasty. Originally a palace guard officer, he rose to prominence through the Emperor's favor. His influence ended after he was implicated in the Prince of Ning rebellion and executed in 1521.

== Biography ==
Qian Ning came from humble beginnings, having been purchased by the eunuch Qian Neng (錢能), who served in the Forbidden City and gave him his surname. After his patron's death, Qian was appointed as the commander of a unit in the palace guard, the Embroidered Uniform Guard. The influential eunuch Liu Jin introduced him to the Zhengde Emperor, the 11th emperor of China's Ming dynasty, who was impressed by his archery and military skills, leading to his appointment as commander of the palace guard. He also provided the Emperor with musicians, Muslim women for his harem, and Tibetan monks who were experts in tantric Buddhism. In 1507, Qian oversaw the construction of a new imperial palace outside the Forbidden City, known as the "Leopard Quarter".

In 1512, he introduced the young officer Jiang Bin to the Emperor, who quickly began to rival his influence. In an attempt to distance himself from Qian, he convinced the Emperor to travel to the northern borderlands, where the Zhengde Emperor spent most of the years 1517–1519. Qian and his allies, including the Zhengde Emperor's favorite actor Zang Xian and minister Lu Wan, had been covering up the treacherous actions of Zhu Chenhao, Prince of Ning, from the Emperor. This was revealed when the prince of Ning rebelled in the summer of 1519 and an investigation uncovered his connections in Beijing. As a result, both Qian and Zang were arrested in December 1519, followed by Lu and other eunuchs and officers a year later.

On 25 June 1521, Qian was executed.
