= Jinshi =

Highest award for the imperial examinations of China

Chinese name
- Traditional Chinese: 進士
- Simplified Chinese: 进士
- Literal meaning: "entered scholar"
Transcriptions
Standard Mandarin
- Hanyu Pinyin: jìnshì
- Wade–Giles: chin⁴-shih⁴
- IPA: [tɕînʂɻ̩̂]
Yue: Cantonese
- Yale Romanization: jeun sih
- Jyutping: zeon3 si6
- IPA: [tsɵn˧si˨]

Vietnamese name
- Vietnamese alphabet: Tiến sĩ
- Chữ Hán: 進士

Korean name
- Hangul: 진사
- Hanja: 進士
Transcriptions
- Revised Romanization: jinsa
- McCune–Reischauer: chinsa

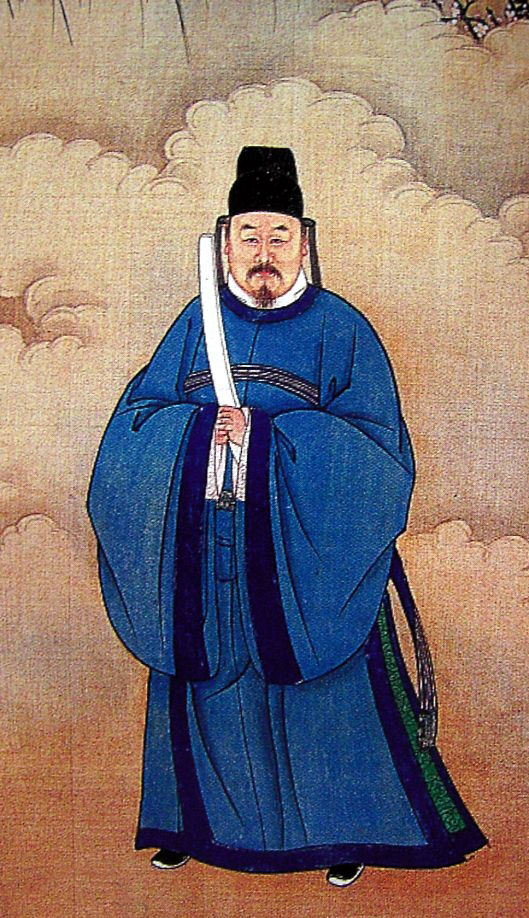
Wang Qiong of Ming in his Jinshi attire

Jinshi (Chinese: 進士; pinyin: jìnshì) was the highest and final degree in the imperial examination in Imperial China. The examination was usually taken in the imperial capital in the palace, and was also called the Metropolitan Exam. Recipients are sometimes referred to in English-language sources as Imperial Scholars.

The highest scoring jinshi in the country was known as the zhuangyuan, a term that survives today in China as a high scoring gaokao test taker or just someone who is very good at a skill.

== History ==
=== China ===
The jinshi degree was first created after the institutionalization of the civil service exam. Initially it had been "for six categories" but was later consolidated into a single degree. The examination system first appeared during the Han dynasty, but the jinshi degree first appeared under the reign of Emperor Yang of Sui. During the Tang dynasty, every year around one to two percent of test takers would obtain a jinshi title out of a total of one to two thousand test takers. By the second half of the Tang dynasty, the majority of senior government officials were jinshi degree holders.

The numbers of jinshi degrees given out were increased in the Song dynasty, and the examinations were given every three years. Most senior officials of the Song dynasty were jinshi holders.

The Ming dynasty resumed the civil-service exam after its occurrence became more irregular in the Yuan dynasty. After the reign of the Emperor Yingzong of Ming, it became the rule that only jinshi holders could enter the Hanlin Academy. On average around 89 jinshi per year were conferred.

During the Qing dynasty around 102 jinshi degrees were given a year.

=== Korea ===
During the Goryeo Dynasty, anyone who passed civil service examination were called jinsa.

During the Joseon dynasty, among the Confucian students who passed the Saengwonjinsa-gwa (생원진사과; 生員進士科), those who passed 'poetry and rhapsody section' (시부; 詩賦; sibu) were called jinsa. The jinsa were eligible for appointment only to lower-ranking posts (such as chambong (참봉; 參奉) and dosa (도사; 都事), and for admission to the Sŏnggyun'gwan. Unlike in China, where the jinshi was the highest and final degree of the imperial examinations, the Joseon jinsa was a lower-level title.

== Subtypes of jinshi recipients ==
- Jinshi Jidi (進士及第, lit. "distinguished jinshi"), graduates ranked first class in the court exam, usually only the top three individuals were qualified for this title.
  - Zhuangyuan (狀元, lit. "top thesis author"), the jinshi who ranked first overall nationwide.
  - Bangyan (榜眼, lit. "eyes positioned alongside"), the jinshi who ranked second overall just below zhuangyuan.
  - Tanhua (探花, lit. "flower snatcher"), the jinshi ranked third overall.
- Jinshi Chushen (進士出身, lit. "jinshi background"), the graduates who ranked second class in court exam, ranking immediately after the tanhua.
- Tong Jinshi Chushen (同進士出身, lit. "along with jinshi background"), graduates ranked third class in the court exam.

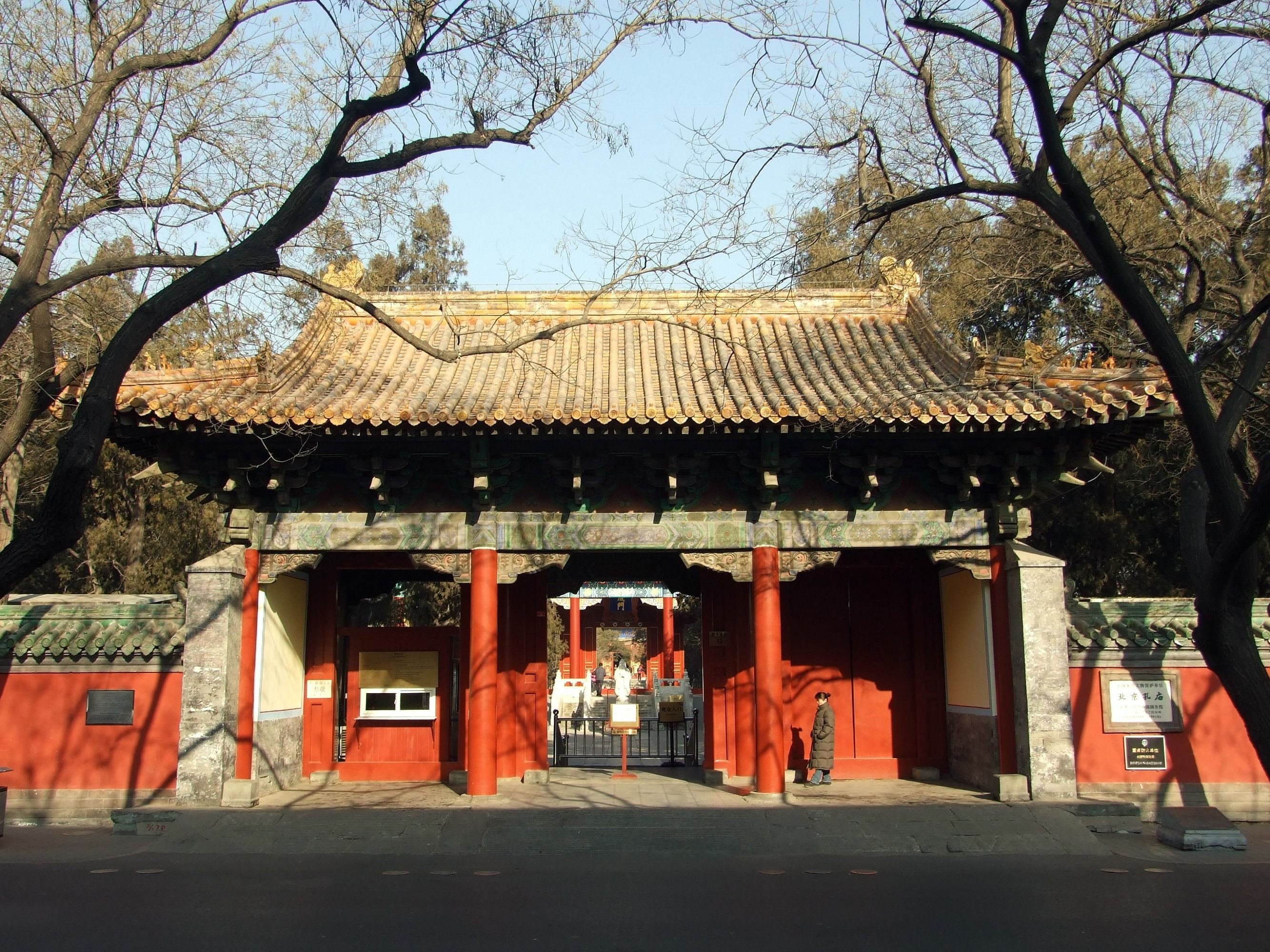
The Confucius Temple in Dongcheng District, firstly built in 1302 under Temür Khan (Emperor Chengzong) is the second largest in China. The temple houses 198 stone tabulets engraved with the names of 51,624 jinshi scholars of the Yuan, Ming and Qing dynasties.

== See also ==
- Qing literati
- Shujishi
