= 16th century =

One hundred years, from 1501 to 1600

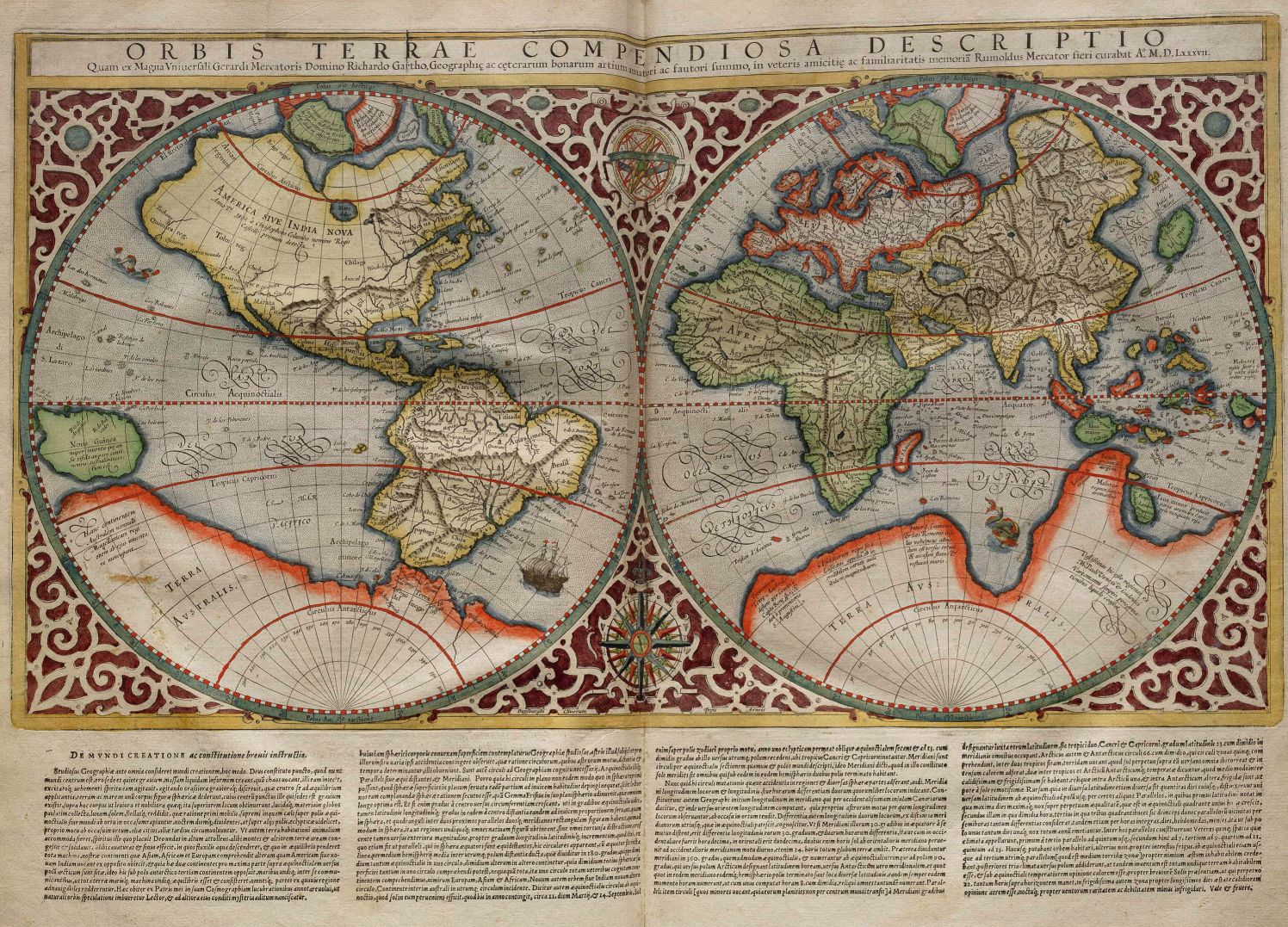
The world map by Gerardus Mercator shows (besides the classical continents Europe, Africa, and Asia) the Americas as America sive India Nova, New Guinea, and other islands of Southeast Asia, as well as a hypothetical Arctic continent and a yet undetermined Terra Australis.

The 16th century begins with the Julian year 1501 (MDI) and ends with either the Julian or the Gregorian year 1600 (MDC) (depending on the reckoning used; the Gregorian calendar introduced a lapse of 10 days in October 1582). The Habsburg Spanish Empire, Portuguese Empire, Ottoman Empire, Safavid Persia, Mughal India and Ming China were the most powerful and hegemonic states.

The Renaissance in Italy and Europe saw the emergence of important artists, authors and scientists, and led to the foundation of important subjects which include accounting and political science. Copernicus proposed the heliocentric universe, which was met with strong resistance, and Tycho Brahe refuted the theory of celestial spheres through observational measurement of the 1572 appearance of a Milky Way supernova. These events directly challenged the long-held notion of an immutable universe supported by Ptolemy and Aristotle, and led to major revolutions in astronomy and science. Galileo Galilei became a champion of the new sciences, invented the first thermometer and made substantial contributions in the fields of physics and astronomy, becoming a major figure in the Scientific Revolution in Europe.

Spain and Portugal colonized large parts of Central and South America, followed by France and England in Northern America and the Lesser Antilles. The Portuguese became the masters of trade between Brazil, the coasts of Africa, and their possessions in the Indies, whereas the Spanish came to dominate the Greater Antilles, Mexico, Peru, and opened trade across the Pacific Ocean, linking the Americas with the Indies. English and French privateers began to practice persistent theft of Spanish and Portuguese treasures. This era of colonialism established mercantilism as the leading school of economic thought, where the economic system was viewed as a zero-sum game in which any gain by one party required a loss by another. The mercantilist doctrine encouraged the many intra-European wars of the period and arguably fueled European expansion and imperialism throughout the world until the 19th century or early 20th century.

The Reformation in central and northern Europe gave a major blow to the authority of the papacy and the Catholic Church. In England, the British-Italian Alberico Gentili wrote the first book on public international law and divided secularism from canon law and Catholic theology. European politics became dominated by religious conflicts, with the groundwork for the epochal Thirty Years' War being laid towards the end of the century.

In the Middle East, the Ottoman Empire continued to expand, with the sultan taking the title of caliph, while dealing with a resurgent Persia. Iran and Iraq were caught by a major popularity of the Shia sect of Islam under the rule of the Safavid dynasty of warrior-mystics, providing grounds for a Persia independent of the majority-Sunni Muslim world.

In the Indian subcontinent, following the defeat of the Delhi Sultanate and Vijayanagara Empire, new powers emerged, the Sur Empire founded by Sher Shah Suri, Deccan sultanates, Rajput states, and the Mughal Empire by Emperor Babur, a direct descendant of Timur and Genghis Khan. His successors Humayun and Akbar, enlarged the empire to include most of South Asia.

Japan suffered a severe civil war at this time, known as the Sengoku period, and emerged from it as a unified nation under Toyotomi Hideyoshi. China was ruled by the Ming dynasty, which was becoming increasingly isolationist, coming into conflict with Japan over the control of Korea as well as Japanese pirates.

In Africa, Christianity had begun to spread in Central Africa and Southern Africa. Until the Scramble for Africa in the late 19th century, most of Africa was left uncolonized.

== Events ==
=== 1501–1509 ===
Mona Lisa, by Leonardo da Vinci, c. 1503–1506, one of the world's best-known paintings

- 1501: Michelangelo returns to his native Florence to begin work on the statue David.
- 1501: Safavid dynasty reunifies Iran and rules over it until 1736. Safavids adopt a Shia branch of Islam.
- 1501: First Battle of Cannanore between the Third Portuguese Armada and Kingdom of Cochin under João da Nova and Zamorin of Kozhikode's navy marks the beginning of Portuguese conflicts in the Indian Ocean.
- 1502: First reported African slaves in the New World
- 1502: The Crimean Khanate sacks Sarai in the Golden Horde, ending its existence.
- 1503: Spain defeats France at the Battle of Cerignola. Considered to be the first battle in history won by gunpowder small arms.
- 1503: Leonardo da Vinci begins painting the Mona Lisa and completes it three years later.
- 1503: Nostradamus is born on either December 14 or December 21.
- 1504: A period of drought, with famine in all of Spain.
- 1504: Death of Isabella I of Castile; Joanna of Castile becomes the Queen.
- 1504: Foundation of the Sultanate of Sennar by Amara Dunqas, in what is modern Sudan
- 1505: Zhengde Emperor ascends the throne of Ming dynasty.
- 1505: Martin Luther enters St. Augustine's Monastery at Erfurt, Germany, on 17 July and begins his journey to instigating the Reformation.
- 1505: Sultan Trenggono builds the first Muslim kingdom in Java, called Demak, in Indonesia. Many other small kingdoms were established in other islands to fight against Portuguese. Each kingdom introduced local language as a way of communication and unity.
- 1506: Leonardo da Vinci completes the Mona Lisa.
- 1506: King Afonso I of Kongo wins the battle of Mbanza Kongo, resulting in Catholicism becoming Kongo's state religion.
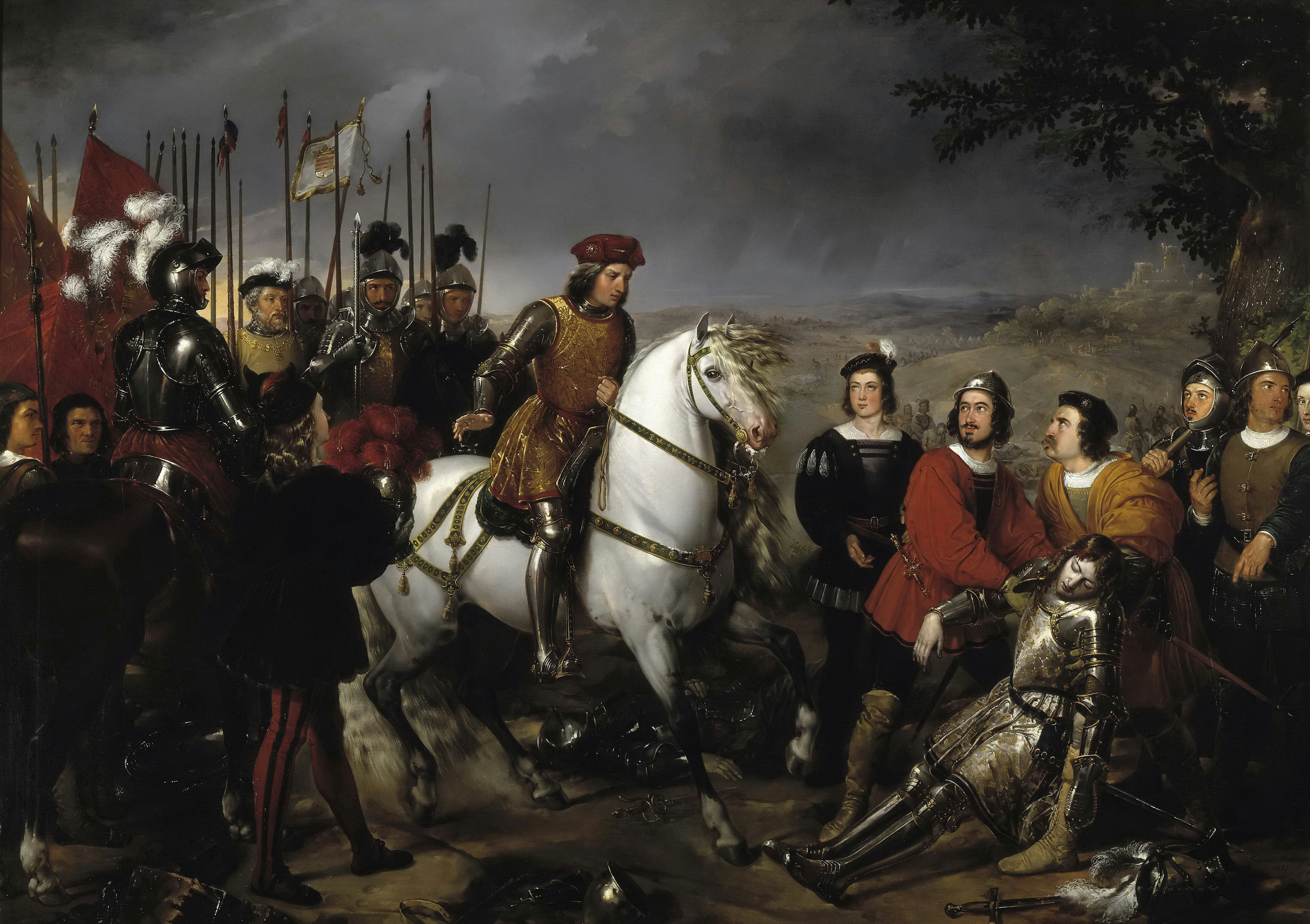
  Battle of Cerignola: El Gran Capitan finds the corpse of Louis d'Armagnac, Duke of Nemours
- 1506: At least two thousand converted Jews are massacred in a Lisbon riot, Portugal.
- 1506: Christopher Columbus dies in Valladolid, Spain.
- 1506: Poland is invaded by Tatars from the Crimean Khanate.
- 1507: The first recorded epidemic of smallpox in the New World on the island of Hispaniola. It devastates the native Taíno population.
- 1507: Afonso de Albuquerque conquered Hormuz and Muscat, among other bases in the Persian Gulf, taking control of the region at the entrance of the Gulf.
- 1508: The Christian-Islamic power struggle in Europe and West Asia spills over into the Indian Ocean as Battle of Chaul during the Portuguese-Mamluk War
- 1508–1512: Michelangelo paints the Sistine Chapel ceiling.
- 1509: The defeat of joint fleet of the Sultan of Gujarat, the Mamlûk Burji Sultanate of Egypt, and the Zamorin of Calicut with support of the Republic of Venice and the Ottoman Empire in Battle of Diu marks the beginning of Portuguese dominance of the Spice trade and the Indian Ocean.
- 1509: The Portuguese king sends Diogo Lopes de Sequeira to find Malacca, the eastern terminus of Asian trade. After initially receiving Sequeira, Sultan Mahmud Shah captures and/or kills several of his men and attempts an assault on the four Portuguese ships, which escape. The Javanese fleet is also destroyed in Malacca.
- 1509: Krishnadevaraya ascends the throne of Vijayanagara Empire.

=== 1510s ===
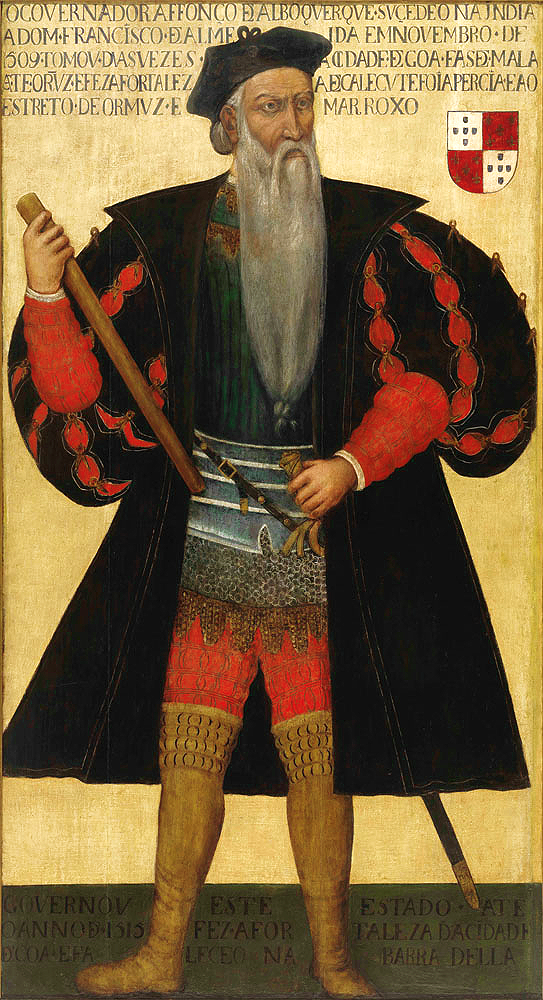
Afonso de Albuquerque

- 1509–1510: The 'great plague' in various parts of Tudor England.
- 1510: Afonso de Albuquerque of Portugal conquers Goa in India.
- 1511: Afonso de Albuquerque of Portugal conquers Malacca, the capital of the Sultanate of Malacca in present-day Malaysia.
- 1512: Copernicus writes Commentariolus, and proclaims the Sun the center of the Solar System.
- 1512: The southern part (historical core) of the Kingdom of Navarre is invaded by Castile and Aragon.
- 1512: Qutb Shahi dynasty, founded by Quli Qutb Mulk, rules Golconda Sultanate until 1687.
- 1512: The first Portuguese exploratory expedition was sent eastward from Malacca (in present-day Malaysia) to search for the 'Spice Islands' (Maluku) led by Francisco Serrão. Serrão is shipwrecked but struggles on to Hitu (northern Ambon) and wins the favour of the local rulers.
- 1513: Machiavelli writes The Prince, a treatise about political philosophy
- 1513: The Portuguese mariner Jorge Álvares lands at Macau, China, during the Ming dynasty.
- 1513: Henry VIII defeats the French at the Battle of the Spurs.
- 1513: The Battle of Flodden Field in which invading Scots are defeated by Henry VIII's forces.
- 1513: Sultan Selim I ("The Grim") orders the massacre of Shia Muslims in Anatolia (present-day Turkey).
- 1513: Vasco Núñez de Balboa, in service of Spain arrives at the Pacific Ocean (which he called Mar del Sur) across the Isthmus of Panama. He was the first European to do so.
- 1514: The Battle of Orsha halts Muscovy's expansion into Eastern Europe.
- 1514: Dózsa rebellion (peasant revolt) in Hungary.
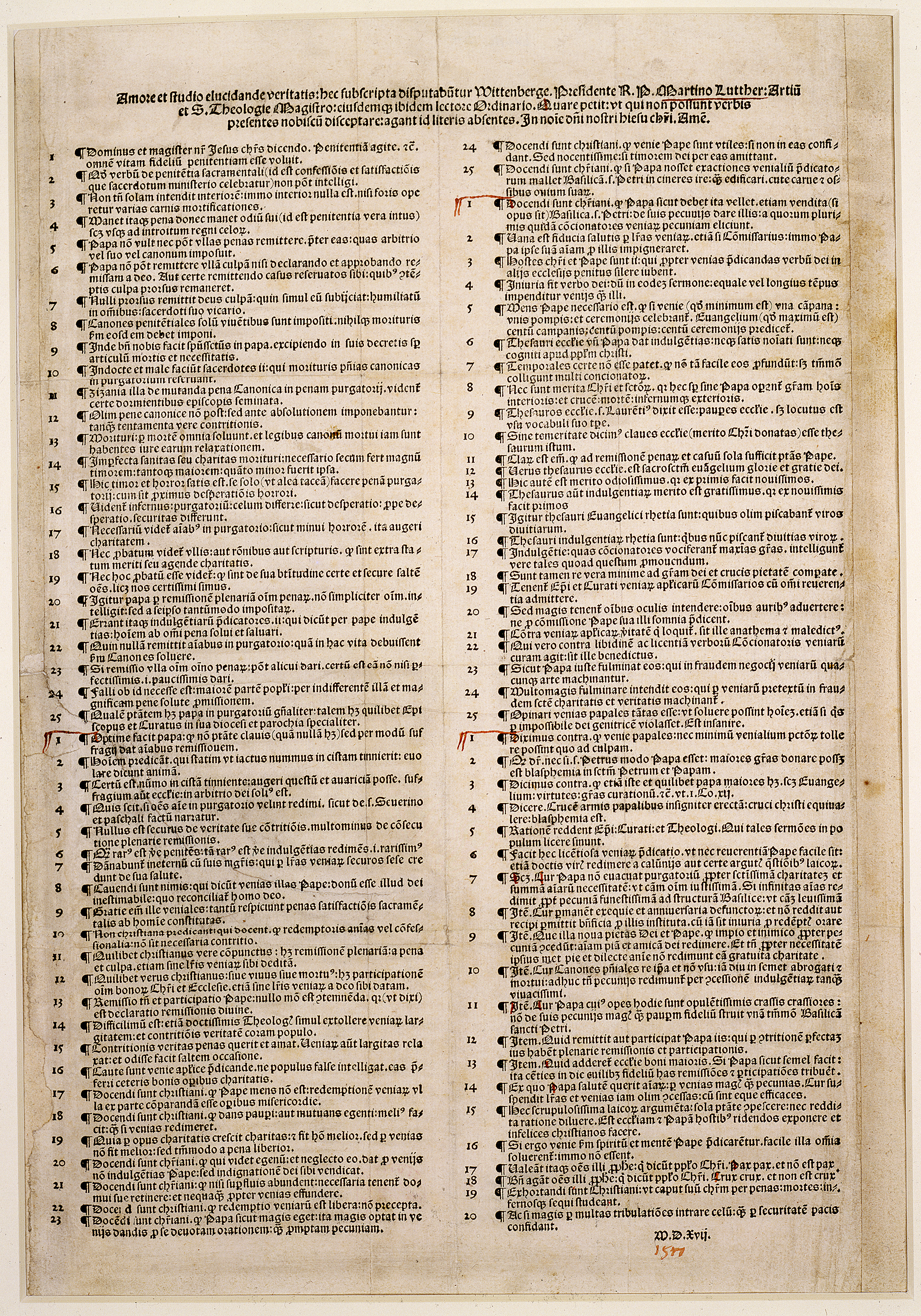
  Martin Luther initiated the Reformation with his Ninety-five Theses in 1517.
- 1514: The Battle of Chaldiran, the Ottoman Empire gains decisive victory against Safavid dynasty.
- 1515: Ascension of Francis I of France as King of France following the death of Louis XII.
- 1515: The Ottoman Empire wrests Eastern Anatolia from the Safavids after the Battle of Chaldiran.
- 1515: The Ottomans conquer the last beyliks of Anatolia, the Dulkadirs and the Ramadanids.
- 1516–1517: The Ottomans defeat the Mamluks and gain control of Egypt, Arabia, and the Levant.
- 1517: The Sweating sickness epidemic in Tudor England.
- 1517: The Reformation begins when Martin Luther posts his Ninety-five Theses in Saxony.
- 1518: The Treaty of London was a non-aggression pact between the major European nations. The signatories were Burgundy, France, England, the Holy Roman Empire, the Netherlands, the Papal States and Spain, all of whom agreed not to attack one another and to come to the aid of any that were under attack.
- 1518: Mir Chakar Khan Rind leaves Baluchistan and settles in Punjab.
- 1518: Leo Africanus, also known as al-Hasan ibn Muhammad al-Wazzan al-Fasi, an Andalusian Berber diplomat who is best known for his book Descrittione dell’Africa (Description of Africa), is captured by Spanish pirates; he is taken to Rome and presented to Pope Leo X.
- 1518: The dancing plague of 1518 begins in Strasbourg, lasting for about one month.
- 1519: Leonardo da Vinci dies of natural causes on May 2.
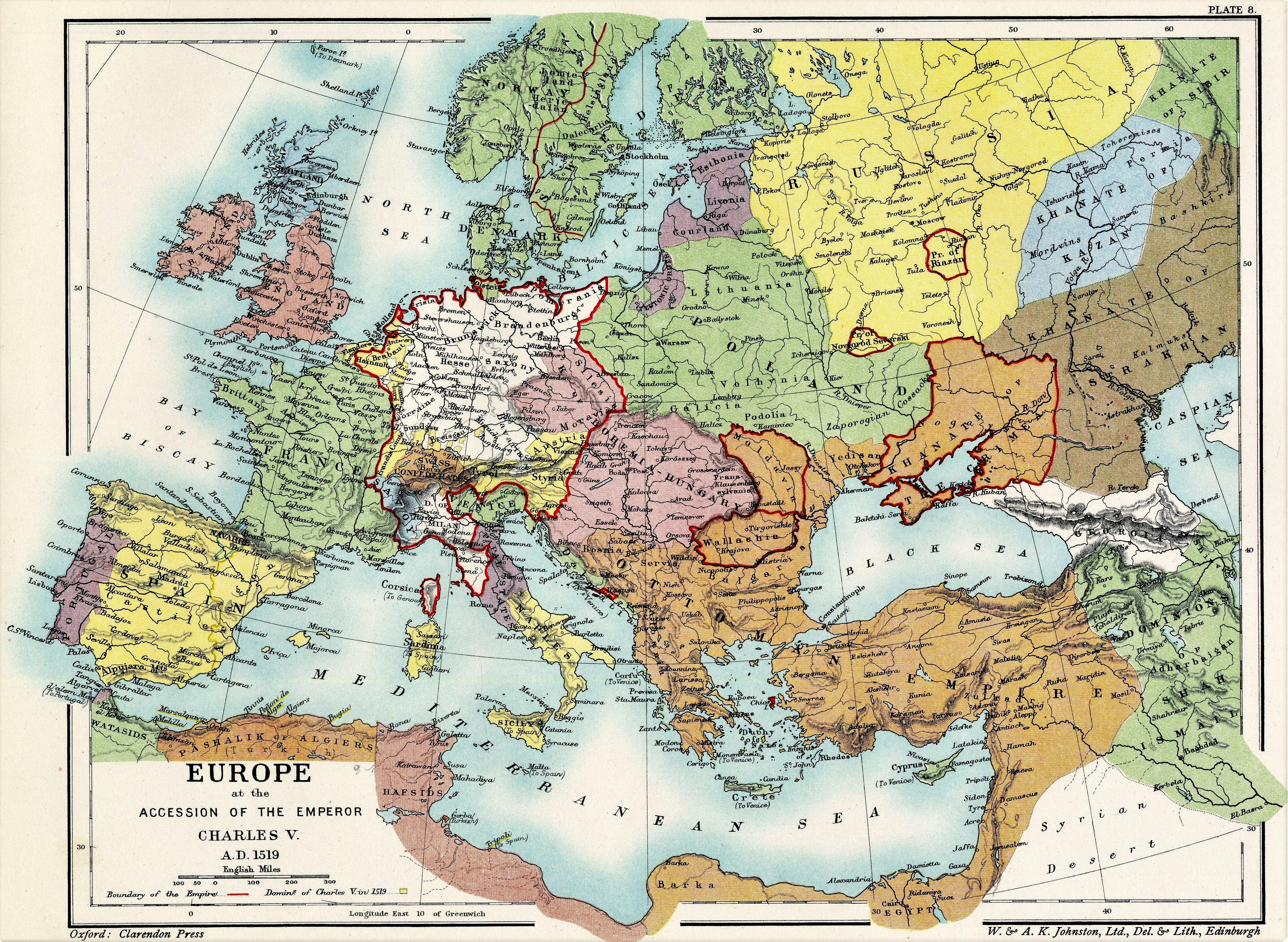
  Europe at the time of the accession of Charles V in 1519
- 1519: Wang Yangming, the Chinese philosopher and governor of Jiangxi province, describes his intent to use the firepower of the fo-lang-ji, a breech-loading Portuguese culverin, in order to suppress the rebellion of Prince Zhu Chenhao.
- 1519: Barbary pirates led by Hayreddin Barbarossa, a Turk appointed to ruling position in Algiers by the Ottoman Empire, raid Provence and Toulon in southern France.
- 1519: Death of Emperor Maximilian; Charles I of Austria, Spain, and the Low Countries becomes Emperor of Holy Roman Empire as Charles V, Holy Roman Emperor (ruled until 1556).
- 1519–1522: Spanish expedition commanded by Magellan and Elcano are the first to Circumnavigate the Earth.
- 1519–1521: Hernán Cortés leads the Spanish conquest of the Aztec Empire.

=== 1520s ===
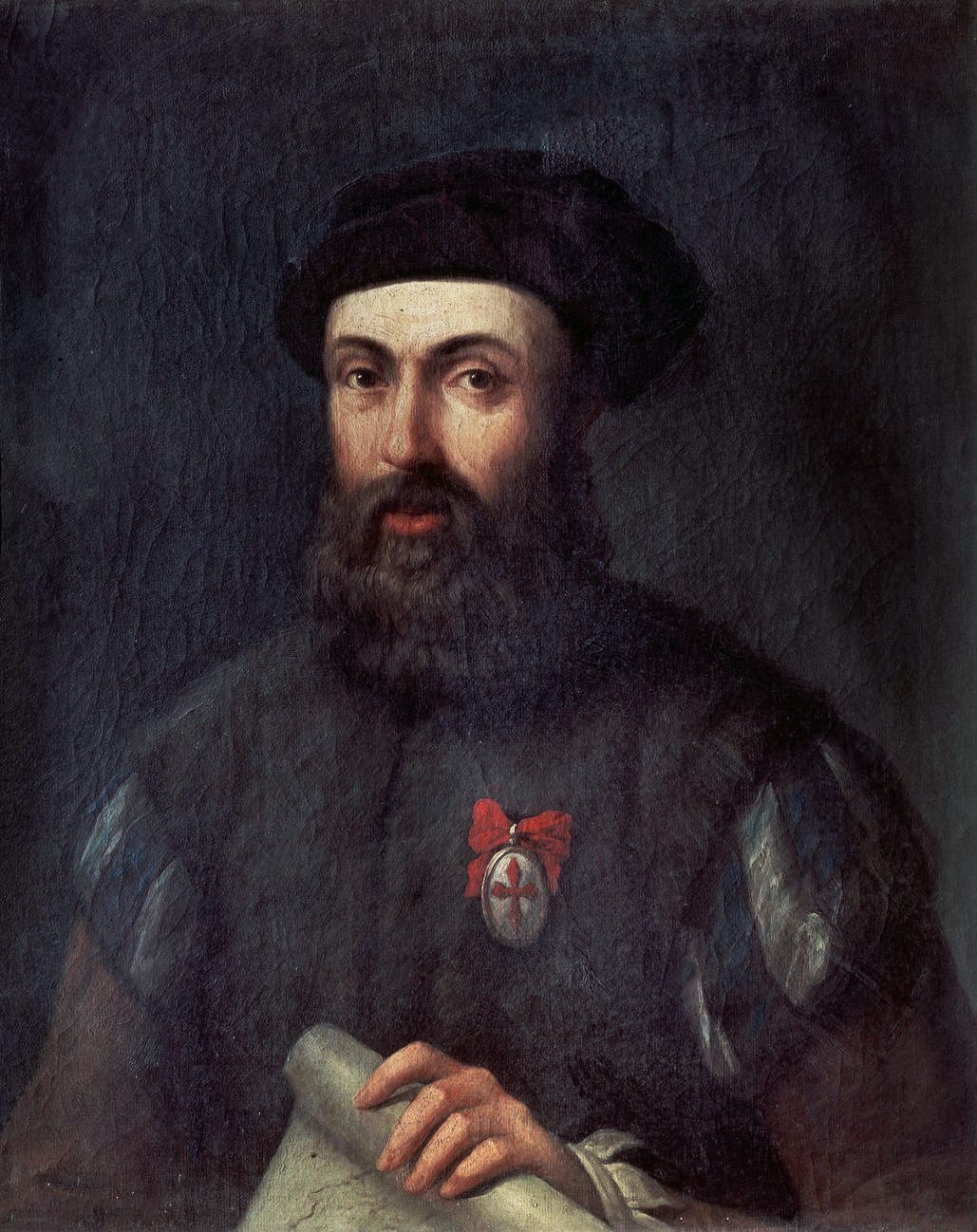
Ferdinand Magellan led the first expedition that circumnavigated the globe in 1519–1522.

- 1520–1566: The reign of Suleiman the Magnificent marks the zenith of the Ottoman Empire.
- 1520: The first European diplomatic mission to Ethiopia, sent by the Portuguese, arrives at Massawa 9 April, and reaches the imperial encampment of Emperor Dawit II in Shewa 9 October.
- 1520: Vijayanagara Empire forces under Krishnadevaraya defeat the Adil Shahi under at the Battle of Raichur
- 1520: Sultan Ali Mughayat Shah of Aceh begins an expansionist campaign capturing Daya on the west Sumatran coast (in present-day Indonesia), and the pepper and gold producing lands on the east coast.
- 1520: The Portuguese established a trading post in the village of Lamakera on the eastern side of Solor (in present-day Indonesia) as a transit harbour between Maluku and Malacca.
- 1521: Belgrade (in present-day Serbia) is captured by the Ottoman Empire.
- 1521: After building fortifications at Tuen Mun, the Portuguese attempt to invade Ming dynasty China, but are expelled by Chinese naval forces.
- 1521: Philippines encountered by Ferdinand Magellan. He was later killed in the Battle of Mactan in central Philippines in the same year.
- 1521: Jiajing Emperor ascended the throne of Ming dynasty, China.
- 1521: November, Ferdinand Magellan's expedition reaches Maluku (in present-day Indonesia) and after trade with Ternate returns to Europe with a load of cloves.
- 1521: Pati Unus leads the invasion of Malacca (in present-day Malaysia) against the Portuguese occupation. Pati Unus was killed in this battle, and was succeeded by his brother, sultan Trenggana.
- 1522: Rhodes falls to the Ottomans of Suleiman the Magnificent.
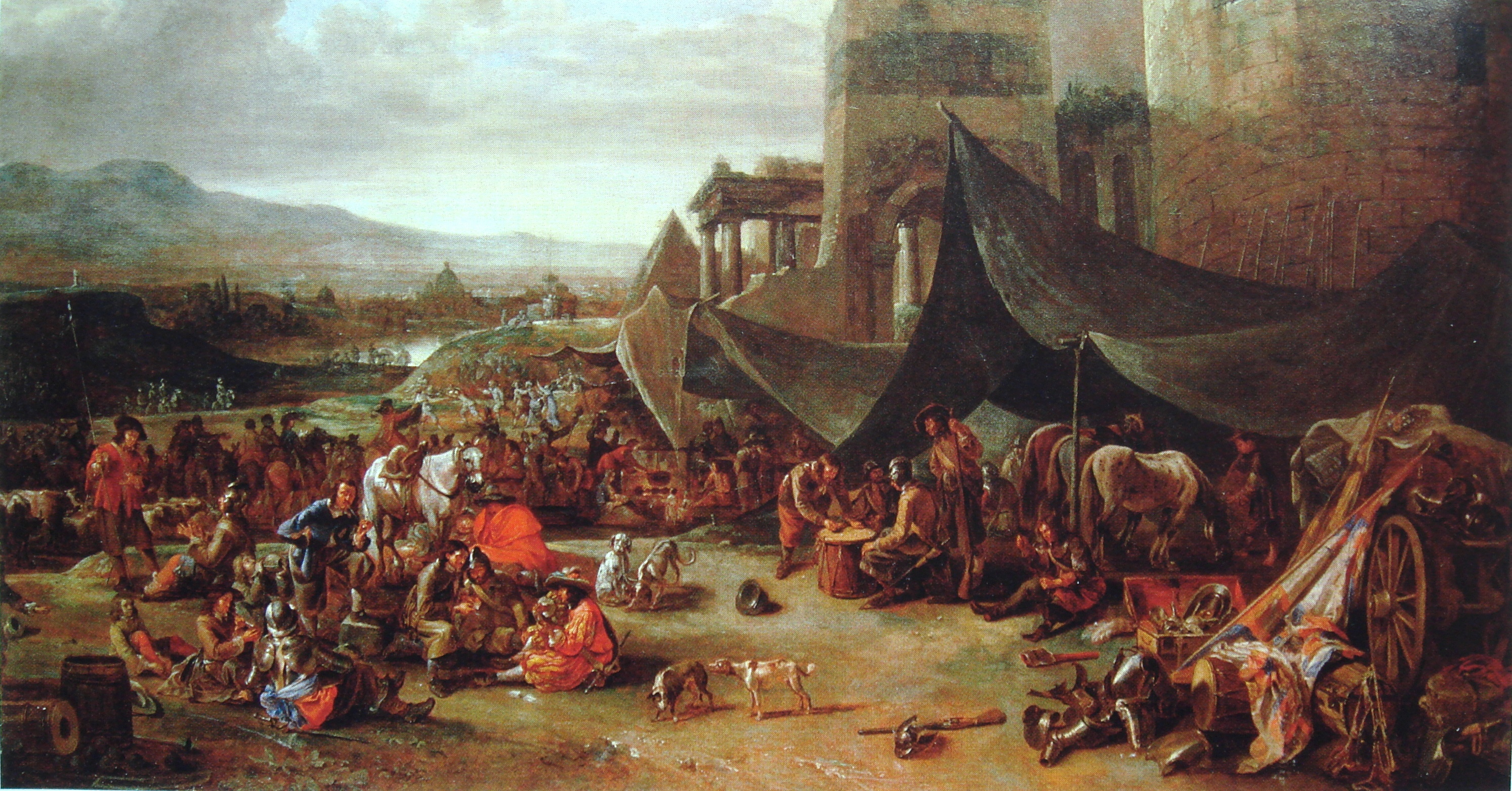
  Sack of Rome of 1527 by Charles V's forces (painting by Johannes Lingelbach)
- 1522: The Portuguese ally themselves with the rulers of Ternate (in present-day Indonesia) and begin construction of a fort.
- 1522: August, Luso-Sundanese Treaty signed between Portugal and Sunda Kingdom granted Portuguese permit to build a fortress in Sunda Kelapa.
- 1523: Sweden gains independence from the Kalmar Union.
- 1523: The Cacao bean is introduced to Spain by Hernán Cortés
- 1524–1525: German Peasants' War in the Holy Roman Empire.
- 1524: Giovanni da Verrazzano is the first European to explore the Atlantic coast of North America between South Carolina and Newfoundland.
- 1524: Ismail I, the founder of Safavid dynasty, dies and Tahmasp I becomes king.
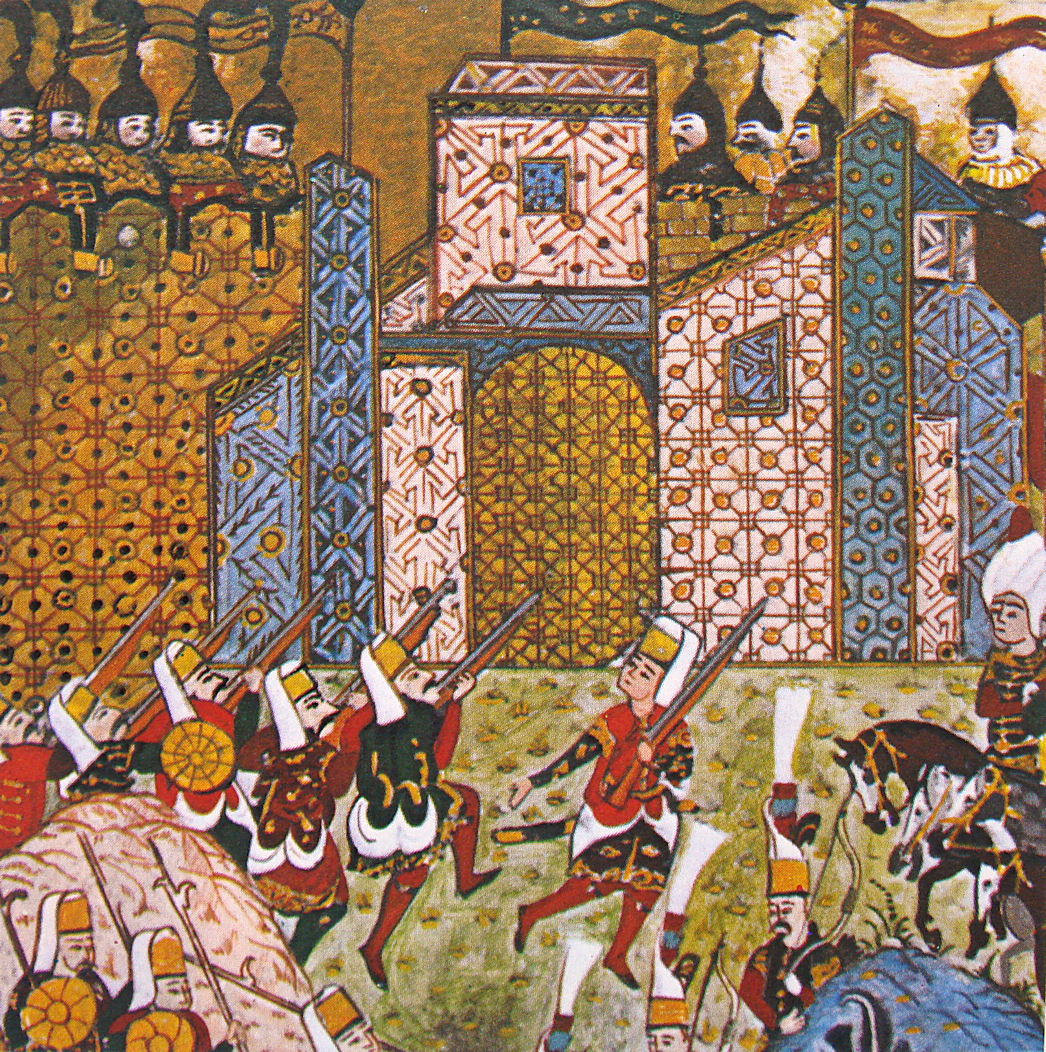
  Gun-wielding Ottoman Janissaries and defending Knights of Saint John at the siege of Rhodes in 1522, from an Ottoman manuscript
- 1525: Timurid Empire forces under Babur defeat the Lodi dynasty at the First Battle of Panipat, end of the Delhi Sultanate.
- 1525: German and Spanish forces defeat France at the Battle of Pavia, Francis I of France is captured.
- 1526: The Ottomans defeat the Kingdom of Hungary at the Battle of Mohács.
- 1526: Mughal Empire, founded by Babur.
- 1527: Sack of Rome with Pope Clement VII escaping and the Swiss Guards defending the Vatican being killed. The sack of the city of Rome considered the end of the Italian Renaissance.
- 1527: Protestant Reformation begins in Sweden.
- 1527: The last ruler of Majapahit falls from power. This state (located in present-day Indonesia) was finally extinguished at the hands of the Demak. A large number of courtiers, artisans, priests, and members of the royalty moved east to the island of Bali; however, the power and the seat of government transferred to Demak under the leadership of Pangeran, later Sultan Fatah.
- 1527: June 22, The Javanese Prince Fatahillah of the Cirebon Sultanate successfully defeated the Portuguese armed forces at the site of the Sunda Kelapa Harbor. The city was then renamed Jayakarta, meaning "a glorious victory." This eventful day came to be acknowledged as Jakarta's Founding Anniversary.
- 1527: Mughal Empire forces defeat the Rajput led by Rana Sanga of Mewar at the Battle of Khanwa
- 1529: The Austrians defeat the Ottoman Empire at the siege of Vienna.
- 1529: Treaty of Zaragoza defined the antimeridian of Tordesillas attributing the Moluccas to Portugal and Philippines to Spain.
- 1529: Imam Ahmad Gurey defeats the Ethiopian Emperor Dawit II in the Battle of Shimbra Kure, the opening clash of the Ethiopian–Adal War.

=== 1530s ===
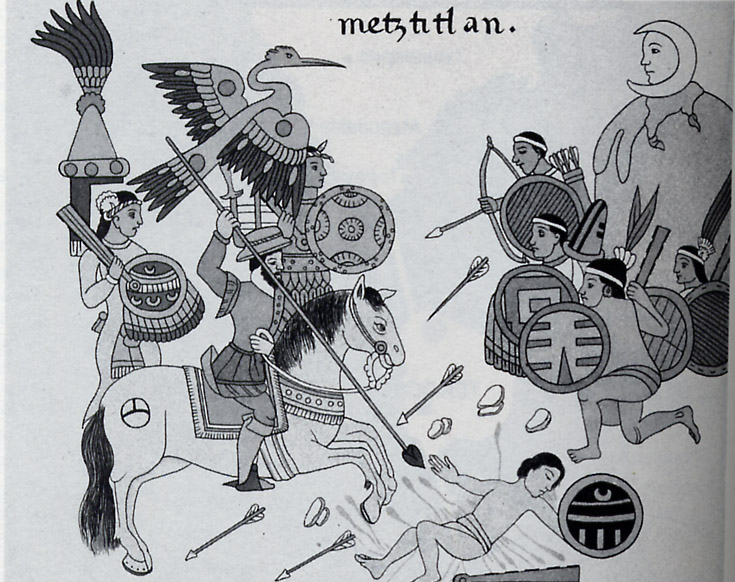
Spanish conquistadors with their Tlaxcallan allies fighting against the Otomies of Metztitlan in present-day Mexico, a 16th-century codex

- 1531–1532: The Church of England breaks away from the Catholic Church and recognises King Henry VIII as the head of the Church.
- 1531: The Inca Civil War is fought between the two brothers, Atahualpa and Huáscar.
- 1532: Francisco Pizarro leads the Spanish conquest of the Inca Empire.
- 1532: Foundation of São Vicente, the first permanent Portuguese settlement in the Americas.
- 1533: Anne Boleyn becomes Queen of England.
- 1533: Elizabeth Tudor is born.
- 1534: Jacques Cartier claims Canada for France.
- 1534: The Ottomans capture Baghdad from the Safavids.
- 1534: Affair of the Placards, where King Francis I becomes more active in repression of French Protestants.
- 1535: The Münster Rebellion, an attempt of radical, millennialist, Anabaptists to establish a theocracy, ends in bloodshed.
- 1535: The Portuguese in Ternate depose Sultan Tabariji (or Tabarija) and send him to Portuguese Goa where he converts to Christianity and bequeaths his Portuguese godfather Jordao de Freitas the island of Ambon. Hairun becomes the next sultan.
- 1536: Catherine of Aragon dies in Kimbolton Castle, in England.
  Territorial expansion of the Ottoman Empire under Suleiman (in red and orange)
- 1536: In England, Anne Boleyn is beheaded for adultery and treason.
- 1536: Establishment of the Inquisition in Portugal.
- 1536: Foundation of Buenos Aires (in present-day Argentina) by Pedro de Mendoza.
- 1537: The Portuguese establish Recife in Pernambuco, north-east of Brazil.
- 1537: William Tyndale's partial translation of the Bible into English is published, which would eventually be incorporated into the King James Bible.
- 1538: Gonzalo Jiménez de Quesada founds Bogotá.
- 1538: Spanish–Venetian fleet is defeated by the Ottoman Turks at the Battle of Preveza.
- 1539: Hernando de Soto explores inland North America.

=== 1540s ===
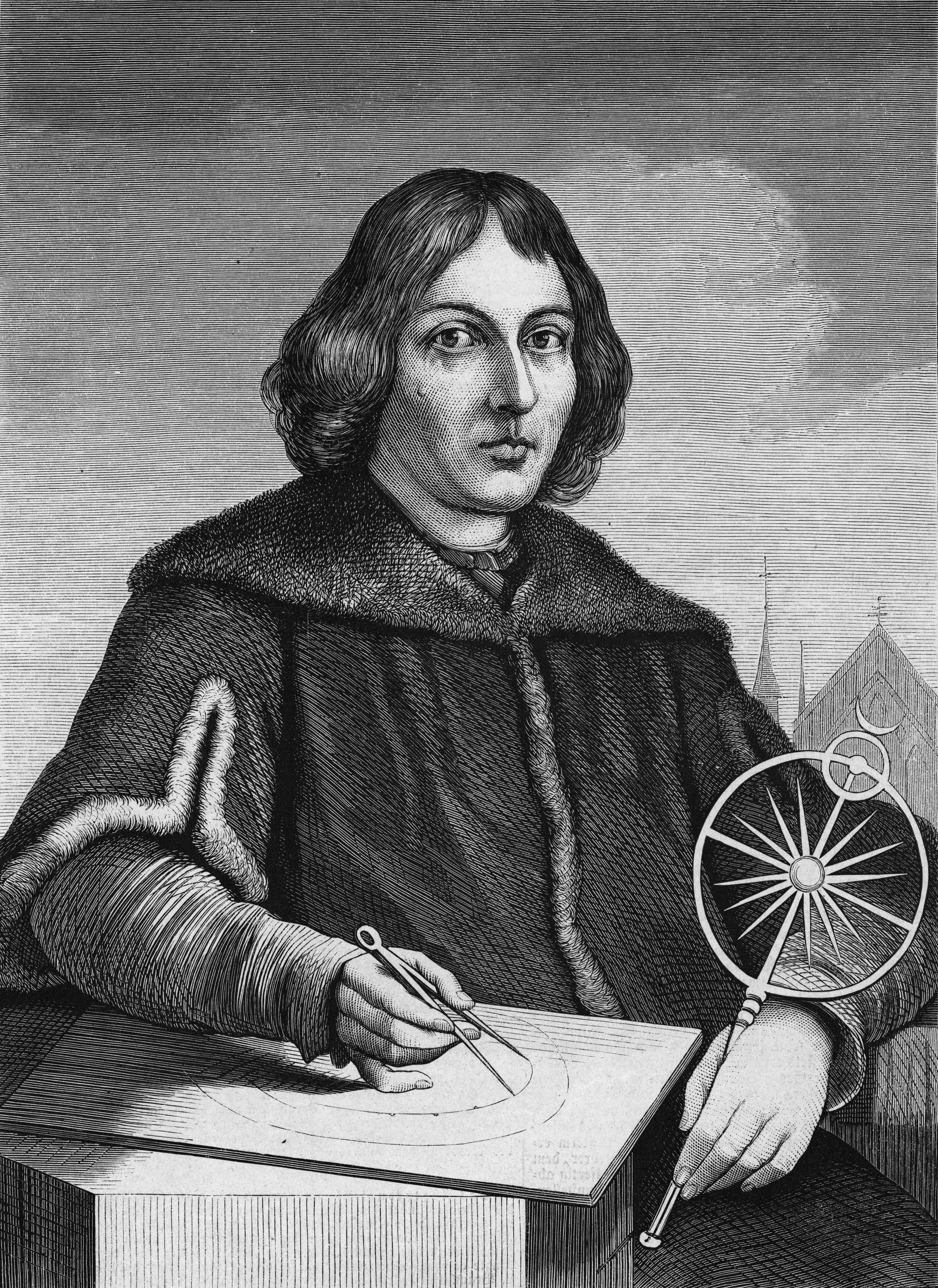
Nicolaus Copernicus

- 1540: The Society of Jesus, or the Jesuits, is founded by Ignatius of Loyola and six companions with the approval of Pope Paul III.
- 1540: Sher Shah Suri founds the Suri dynasty in South Asia, an ethnic Pashtun (Pathan) of the house of Sur, who supplanted the Mughal dynasty as rulers of North India during the reign of the relatively ineffectual second Mughal emperor Humayun. Sher Shah Suri decisively defeats Humayun in the Battle of Bilgram (May 17, 1540).
- 1541: Pedro de Valdivia founds Santiago in Chile.
- 1541: An Algerian military campaign by Charles V of Spain (Habsburg) is unsuccessful.
- 1541: Amazon River is encountered and explored by Francisco de Orellana.
- 1541: Capture of Buda and the absorption of the major part of Hungary by the Ottoman Empire.
- 1541: Sahib I Giray of Crimea invades Russia.
- 1542: The Italian War of 1542–1546 War resumes between Francis I of France and Emperor Charles V. This time Henry VIII is allied with the Emperor, while James V of Scotland and Sultan Suleiman I are allied with the French.
- 1542: Akbar The Great is born in the Rajput Umarkot Fort
- 1542: Spanish explorer Ruy López de Villalobos named the island of Samar and Leyte Las Islas Filipinas honoring Philip II of Spain and became the official name of the archipelago.
- 1543: Ethiopian/Portuguese troops defeat the Adal army led by Imam Ahmad Gurey at the Battle of Wayna Daga; Imam Ahmad Gurey is killed at this battle.
- 1543: Copernicus publishes his theory that the Earth and the other planets revolve around the Sun
- 1543: The Nanban trade period begins after Portuguese traders make contact with Japan.
- 1544: The French defeat an Imperial–Spanish army at the Battle of Ceresole.
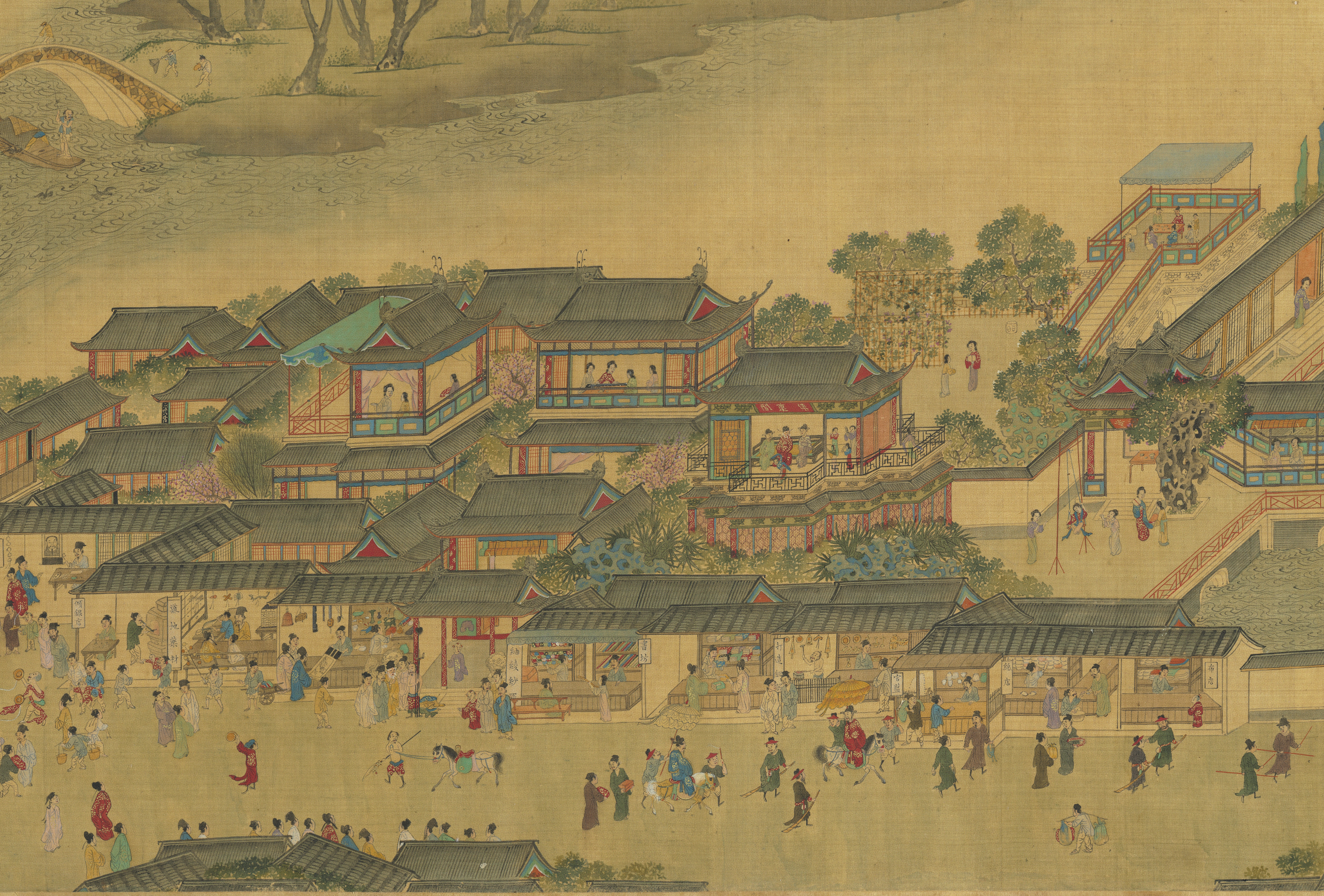
  Scenes of everyday life in Ming China, by Qiu Ying
- 1544: Battle of the Shirts in Scotland. The Frasers and Macdonalds of Clan Ranald fight over a disputed chiefship; reportedly, 5 Frasers and 8 Macdonalds survive.
- 1545: Songhai forces sack the Malian capital of Niani
- 1545: The Council of Trent meets for the first time in Trent (in northern Italy).
- 1546: Michelangelo Buonarroti is made chief architect of St. Peter's Basilica.
- 1546: Francis Xavier works among the peoples of Ambon, Ternate and Morotai (Moro) laying the foundations for a permanent mission. (to 1547)
- 1547: Henry VIII dies in the Palace of Whitehall on 28 January at the age of 55.
- 1547: Francis I dies in the Château de Rambouillet on 31 March at the age of 52.
- 1547: Edward VI becomes King of England and Ireland on 28 January and is crowned on 20 February at the age of 9.
- 1547: Emperor Charles V decisively dismantles the Schmalkaldic League at the Battle of Mühlberg.
- 1547: Grand Prince Ivan the Terrible is crowned tsar of (All) Russia, thenceforth becoming the first Russian tsar.
- 1548: Battle of Uedahara: Firearms are used for the first time on the battlefield in Japan, and Takeda Shingen is defeated by Murakami Yoshikiyo.
- 1548: Askia Daoud, who reigned from 1548 to 1583, establishes public libraries in Timbuktu (in present-day Mali).
- 1548: The Ming dynasty government of China issues a decree banning all foreign trade and closes down all seaports along the coast; these Hai jin laws came during the Wokou wars with Japanese pirates.
- 1549: Tomé de Sousa establishes Salvador in Bahia, north-east of Brazil.
- 1549: Arya Penangsang with the support of his teacher, Sunan Kudus, avenges the death of Raden Kikin by sending an envoy named Rangkud to kill Sunan Prawoto by Keris Kyai Satan Kober (in present-day Indonesia).

=== 1550s ===
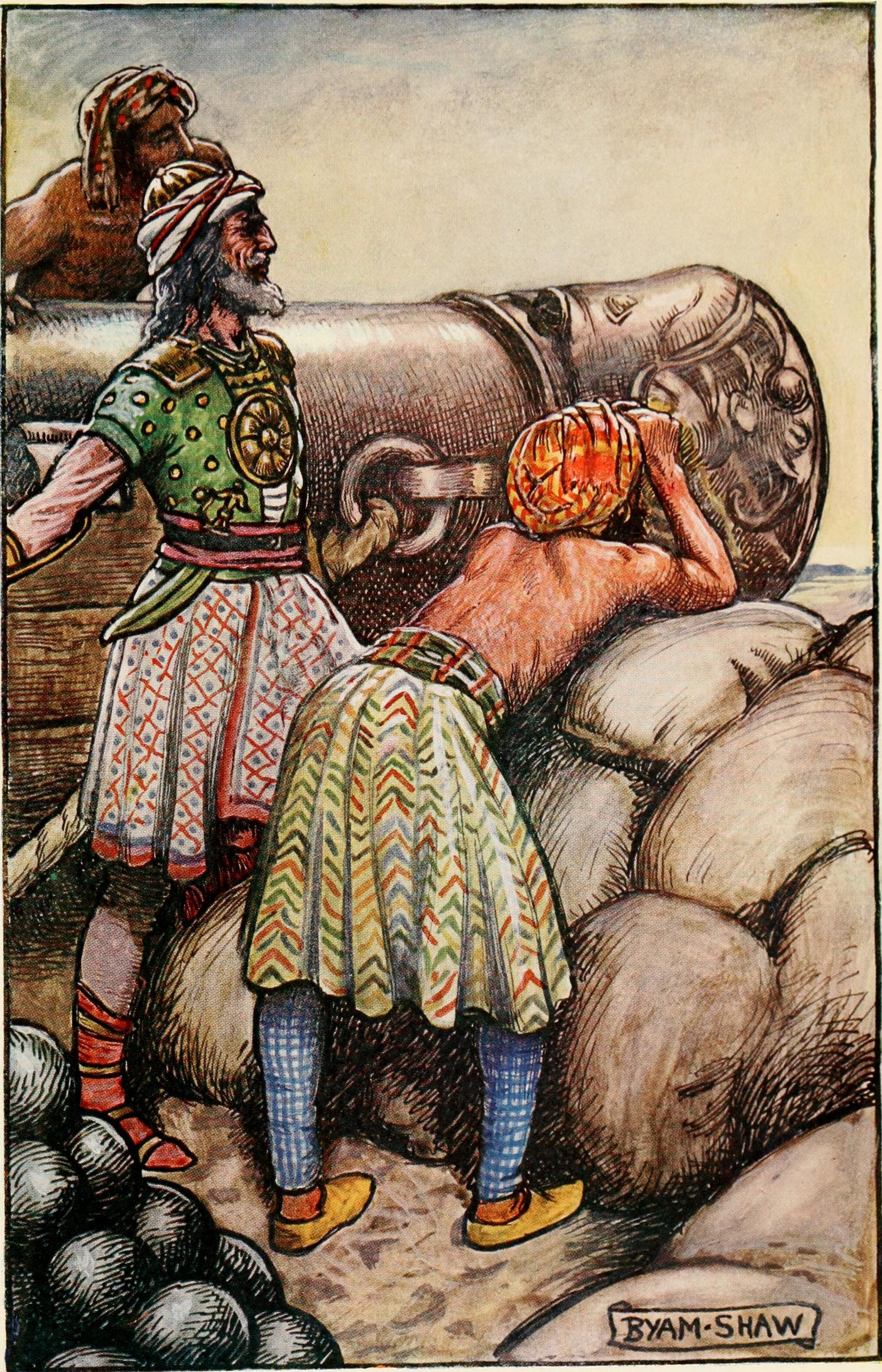
The Islamic gunpowder empires: Mughal Army artillerymen during the reign of Jalaluddin Akbar

- 1550: The architect Mimar Sinan builds the Süleymaniye Mosque in Istanbul.
- 1550: Mongols led by Altan Khan invade China and besiege Beijing.
- 1550–1551: Valladolid debate concerning the human rights of the Indigenous people of the Americas.
- 1551: Fifth outbreak of sweating sickness in England. John Caius of Shrewsbury writes the first full contemporary account of the symptoms of the disease.
- 1551: North African pirates enslave the entire population of the Maltese island Gozo, between 5,000 and 6,000, sending them to Libya.
- 1552: Russia conquers the Khanate of Kazan.
- 1552: Jesuit China Mission, Francis Xavier dies.
- 1553: Mary Tudor becomes the first queen regnant of England and restores the Church of England under Papal authority.
- 1553: The Portuguese found a settlement at Macau.
- 1554: Missionaries José de Anchieta and Manuel da Nóbrega establishes São Paulo, southeast Brazil.
- 1554: Princess Elizabeth is imprisoned in the Tower of London upon the orders of Mary I for suspicion of being involved in the Wyatt rebellion.
- 1555: The Muscovy Company is the first major English joint stock trading company.
- 1556: Publication in Venice of Delle Navigiationi et Viaggi (terzo volume) by Giovanni Battista Ramusio, secretary of Council of Ten, with plan La Terra de Hochelaga, an illustration of the Hochelaga.
- 1556: The Shaanxi earthquake in China is history's deadliest known earthquake during the Ming dynasty.
- 1556: Georgius Agricola, the "Father of Mineralogy", publishes his De re metallica.
- 1556: Akbar defeats Hemu at the Second battle of Panipat.
- 1556: Russia conquers the Astrakhan Khanate.
- 1556–1605: During his reign, Akbar expands the Mughal Empire in a series of conquests (in the Indian subcontinent).
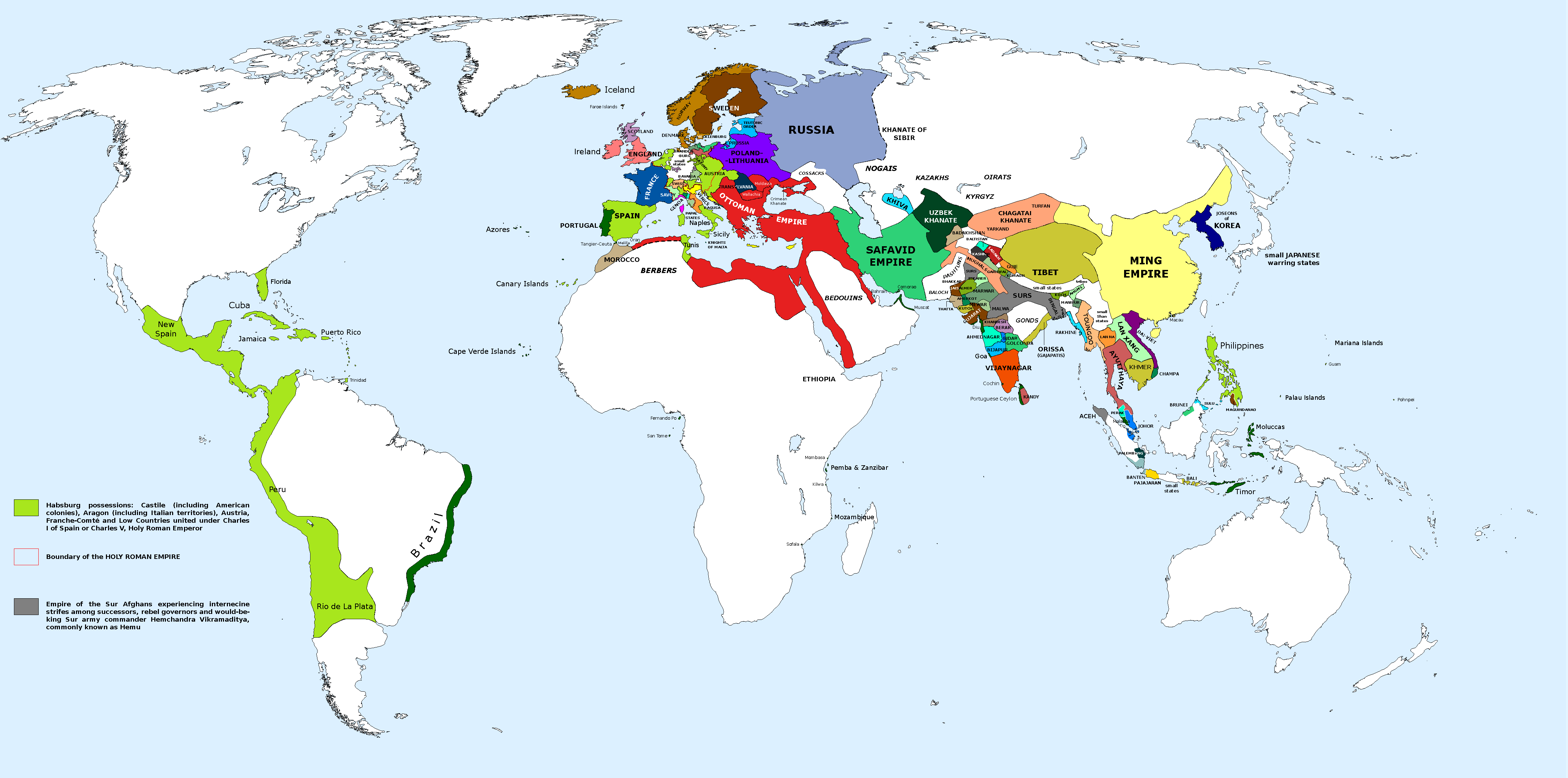
  Political map of the world in 1556
- 1556: Mir Chakar Khan Rind captures Delhi with Humayun.
- 1556: Pomponio Algerio, radical theologian, is executed by boiling in oil as part of the Roman Inquisition.
- 1557: Habsburg Spain declares bankruptcy. Philip II of Spain had to declare four state bankruptcies in 1557, 1560, 1575 and 1596.
- 1557: The Portuguese settle in Macau (on the western side of the Pearl River Delta across from present-day Hong Kong).
- 1557: The Ottomans capture Massawa, all but isolating Ethiopia from the rest of the world.
- 1558: Elizabeth Tudor becomes Queen Elizabeth I at age 25.
- 1558–1603: The Elizabethan era is considered the height of the English Renaissance.
- 1558–1583: Livonian War between Poland, Grand Principality of Lithuania, Sweden, Denmark and Russia.
- 1558: After 200 years, the Kingdom of England loses Calais to France.
- 1559: With the Peace of Cateau Cambrésis, the Italian Wars conclude.
- 1559: Sultan Hairun of Ternate (in present-day Indonesia) protests the Portuguese's Christianisation activities in his lands. Hostilities between Ternate and the Portuguese.

=== 1560s ===
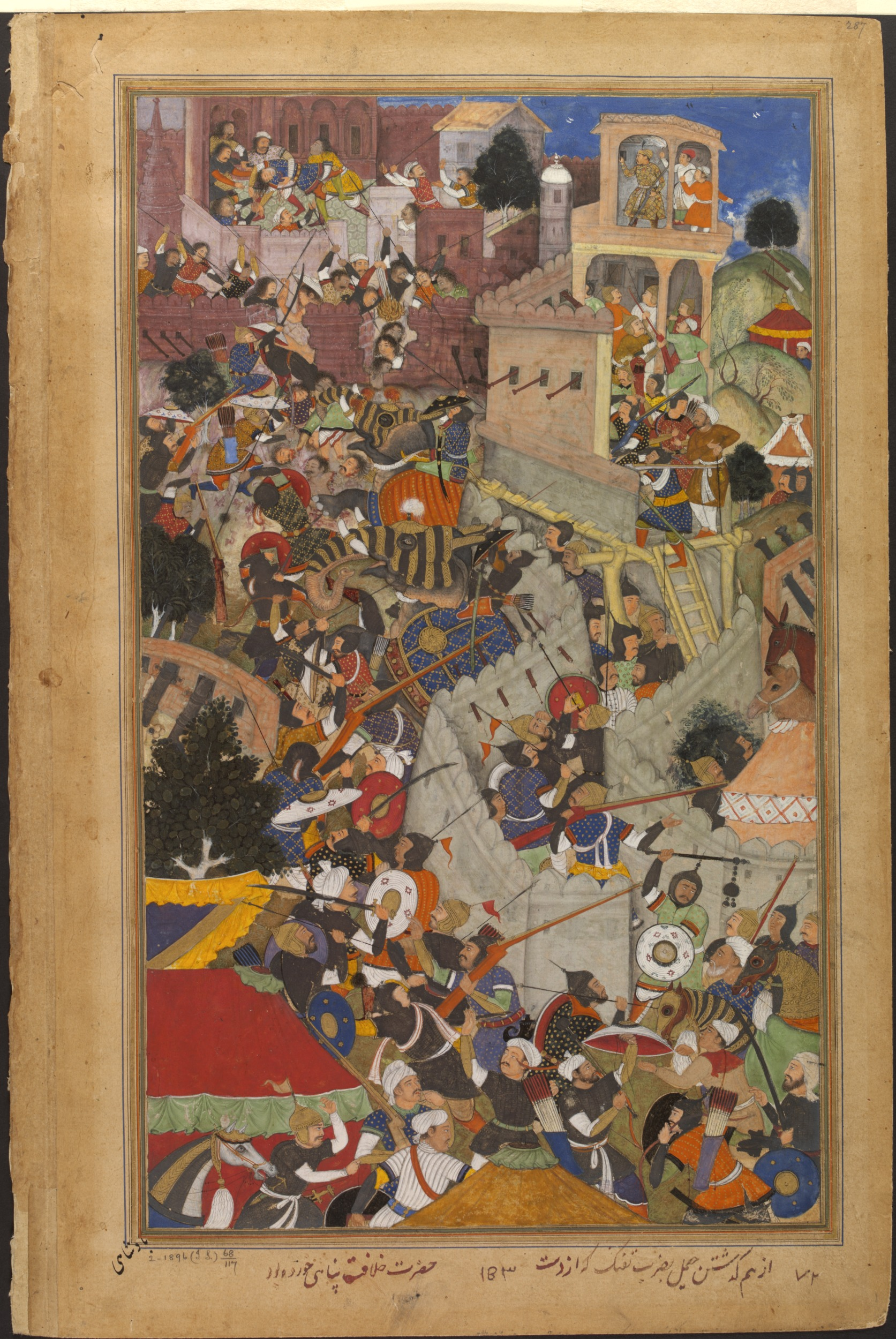
The Mughal Emperor Akbar shoots the Rajput warrior Jaimal during the Siege of Chittorgarh in 1567

- 1560: Ottoman navy defeats the Spanish fleet at the Battle of Djerba.
- 1560: Elizabeth Bathory is born in Nyirbator, Hungary.
- 1560: By winning the Battle of Okehazama, Oda Nobunaga becomes one of the pre-eminent warlords of Japan.
- 1560: Jeanne d'Albret declares Calvinism the official religion of Navarre.
- 1560: Lazarus Church, Macau
- 1561: Sir Francis Bacon is born in London.
- 1561: The fourth battle of Kawanakajima between the Uesugi and Takeda at Hachimanbara takes place.
- 1561: Guido de Bres draws up the Belgic Confession of Protestant faith.
- 1562: Mughal emperor Akbar reconciles the Muslim and Hindu factions by marrying into the powerful Rajput Hindu caste.
- 1562–1598: French Wars of Religion between Catholics and Huguenots.
- 1562: Massacre of Wassy and Battle of Dreux in the French Wars of Religion.
- 1562: Portuguese Dominican priests build a palm-trunk fortress which Javanese Muslims burned down the following year. The fort was rebuilt from more durable materials and the Dominicans commenced the Christianisation of the local population.
- 1563: Plague outbreak claimed 80,000 people in Elizabethan England. In London alone, over 20,000 people died of the disease.
- 1564: Galileo Galilei born on February 15
- 1564: William Shakespeare baptized 26 April
- 1565: Deccan sultanates defeat the Vijayanagara Empire at the Battle of Talikota.
- 1565: Mir Chakar Khan Rind dies at aged 97.
- 1565: Estácio de Sá establishes Rio de Janeiro in Brazil.
- 1565: The Hospitallers, a Crusading Order, defeat the Ottoman Empire at the siege of Malta (1565).
- 1565: Miguel López de Legazpi establishes in Cebu the first Spanish settlement in the Philippines starting a period of Spanish colonization that would last over three hundred years.
- 1565: Spanish navigator Andres de Urdaneta discovers the maritime route from Asia to the Americas across the Pacific Ocean, also known as the tornaviaje.
- 1565: Royal Exchange is founded by Thomas Gresham.
- 1566: Suleiman the Magnificent, ruler of the Ottoman Empire, dies on September 7, during the battle of Szigetvar.
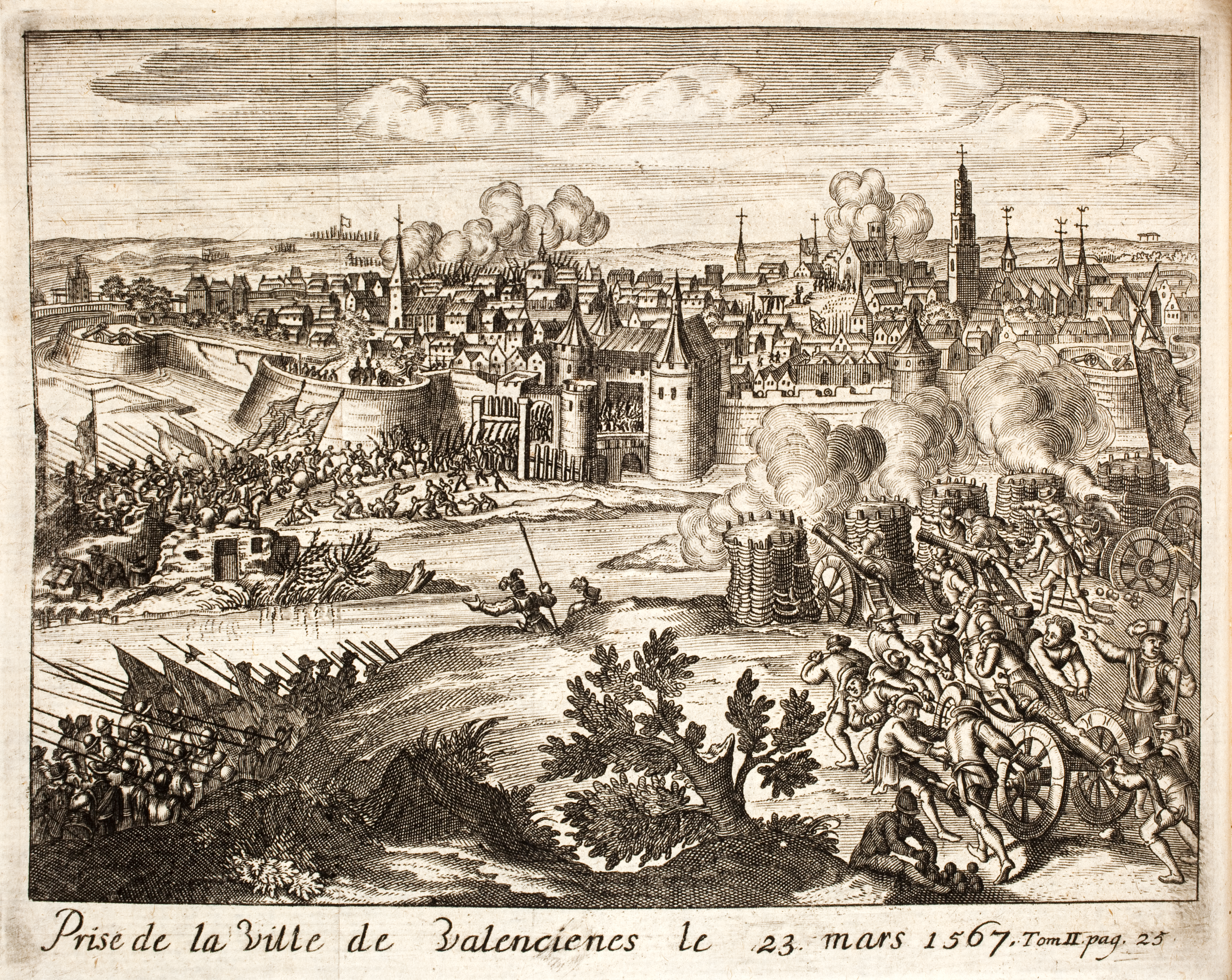
  Siege of Valenciennes during the Dutch War of Independence in 1567
- 1566–1648: Eighty Years' War between Spain and the Netherlands.
- 1566: Da le Balle Contrade d'Oriente, composed by Cipriano de Rore.
- 1567: After 45 years' reign, Jiajing Emperor died in the Forbidden City, Longqing Emperor ascended the throne of Ming dynasty.
- 1567: Mary, Queen of Scots, is imprisoned by Elizabeth I.
- 1568: The Transylvanian Diet, under the patronage of the prince John Sigismund Zápolya, the former king of Hungary, inspired by the teachings of Ferenc Dávid, the founder of the Unitarian Church of Transylvania, promulgates the Edict of Torda, the first law of freedom of religion and of conscience in the World.
- 1568–1571: Morisco Revolt in Spain.
- 1568–1600: The Azuchi-Momoyama period in Japan.
- 1568: Hadiwijaya sent his adopted son and son in-law Sutawijaya, who would later become the first ruler of the Mataram dynasty of Indonesia, to kill Arya Penangsang.
- 1569: Rising of the North in England.
- 1569: Mercator 1569 world map published by Gerardus Mercator.
- 1569: The Polish–Lithuanian Commonwealth is created with the Union of Lublin, which lasts until 1795.
- 1569: Peace treaty signed by Sultan Hairun of Ternate and Governor Lopez de Mesquita of Portugal.

=== 1570s ===
The Battle of Lepanto

- 1570: Ivan the Terrible, tsar of Russia, orders the massacre of inhabitants of Novgorod.
- 1570: Pope Pius V issues Regnans in Excelsis, a papal bull excommunicating all who obeyed Elizabeth I and calling on all Catholics to rebel against her.
- 1570: Sultan Hairun of Ternate (in present-day Indonesia) is killed by the Portuguese. Babullah becomes the next Sultan.
- 1570: 20,000 inhabitants of Nicosia in Cyprus were massacred and every church, public building, and palace was looted. Cyprus fell to the Ottoman Turks the following year.
- 1571: Pope Pius V completes the Holy League as a united front against the Ottoman Turks, responding to the fall of Cyprus to the Ottomans.
- 1571: The Spanish-led Holy League navy destroys the Ottoman navy at the Battle of Lepanto.
- 1571: Crimean Tatars attack and sack Moscow, burning everything but the Kremlin.
- 1571: American Indians kill Spanish missionaries in what would later be Jamestown, Virginia.
- 1571: Spanish conquistador Miguel López de Legazpi establishes Manila, Philippines as the capital of the Spanish East Indies.
- 1572: Brielle is taken from Habsburg Spain by Protestant Watergeuzen in the Capture of Brielle, in the Eighty Years' War.
- 1572: Spanish conquistadores apprehend the last Inca leader Tupak Amaru at Vilcabamba, Peru, and execute him in Cuzco.
- 1572: Jeanne d'Albret dies aged 43 and is succeeded by Henry of Navarre.
- 1572: Catherine de' Medici instigates the St. Bartholomew's Day massacre, which takes the lives of Protestant leader Gaspard de Coligny and thousands of Huguenots. The violence spreads from Paris to other cities and the countryside.
- 1572: First edition of the epic The Lusiads of Luís Vaz de Camões, three years after the author returned from the East.
- 1572: The 9 years old Taizi, Zhu Yijun ascended the throne of Ming dynasty, known as Wanli Emperor.
- 1573: After heavy losses on both sides the siege of Haarlem ends in a Spanish victory.
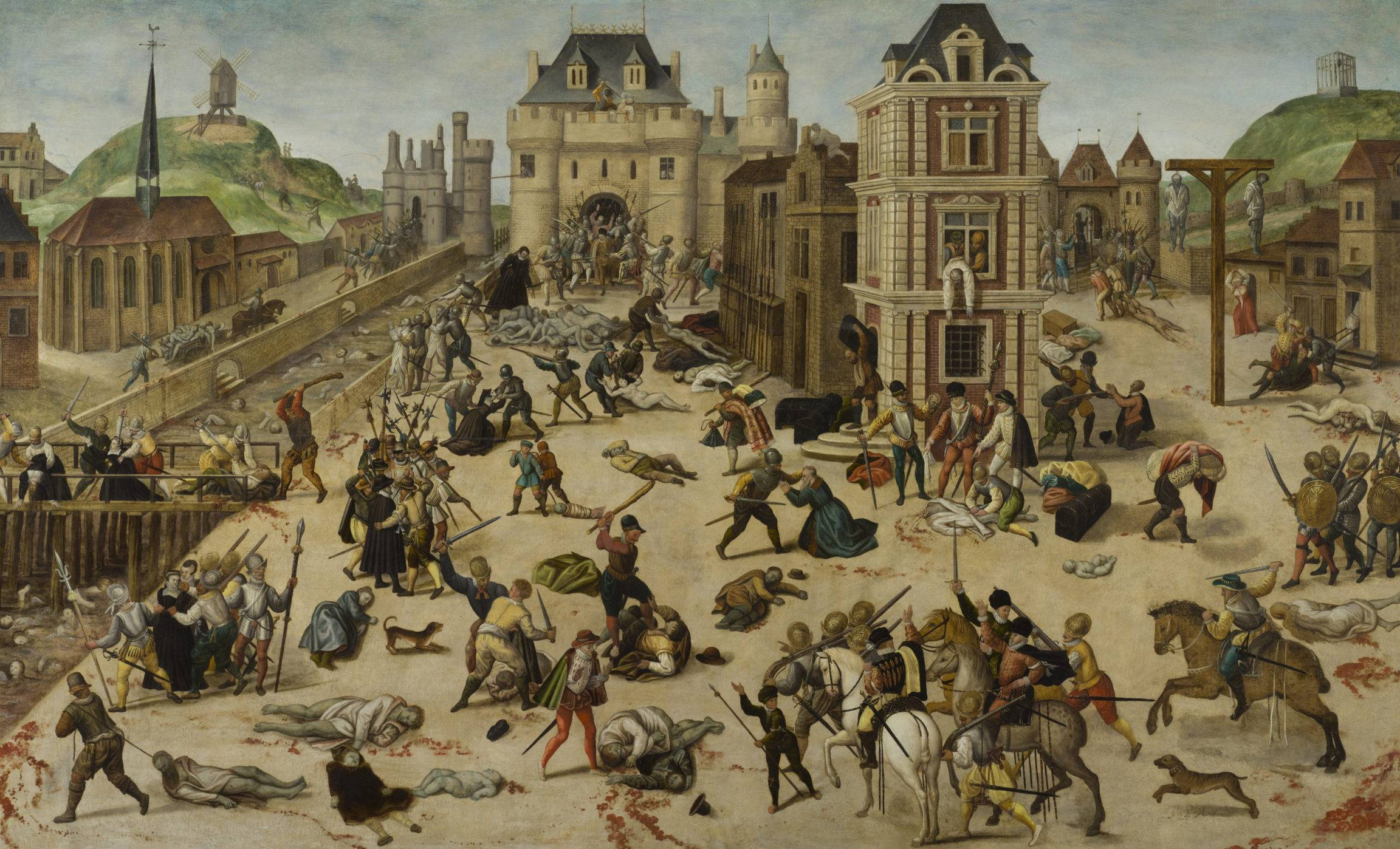
  St. Bartholomew's Day massacre of French Protestants
- 1574: in the Eighty Years' War the capital of Zeeland, Middelburg declares for the Protestants.
- 1574: After a siege of 4 months the siege of Leiden ends in a comprehensive Dutch rebel victory.
- 1575: Oda Nobunaga finally captures Nagashima fortress.
- 1575: Following a five-year war, the Ternateans under Sultan Babullah defeated the Portuguese.
- 1576: Tahmasp I, Safavid shah, dies.
- 1576: The Battle of Haldighati is fought between the ruler of Mewar, Maharana Pratap and the Mughal Empire's forces under Emperor Akbar led by Raja Man Singh.
- 1576: Sack of Antwerp by badly paid Spanish soldiers.
- 1577–1580: Francis Drake circles the world.
- 1577: Ki Ageng Pemanahan built his palace in Pasargede or Kotagede.
- 1578: King Sebastian of Portugal is killed at the Battle of Alcazarquivir.
- 1578: The Portuguese establish a fort on Tidore but the main centre for Portuguese activities in Maluku becomes Ambon.
- 1578: Sonam Gyatso is conferred the title of Dalai Lama by Tumed Mongol ruler, Altan Khan. Recognised as the reincarnation of two previous Lamas, Sonam Gyatso becomes the third Dalai Lama in the lineage.
- 1578: Governor-General Francisco de Sande officially declared war against Brunei in 1578, starting the Castilian War of 1578.
- 1579: The Union of Utrecht unifies the northern Netherlands, a foundation for the later Dutch Republic.
- 1579: The Union of Arras unifies the southern Netherlands, a foundation for the later states of the Spanish Netherlands, the Austrian Netherlands and Belgium.
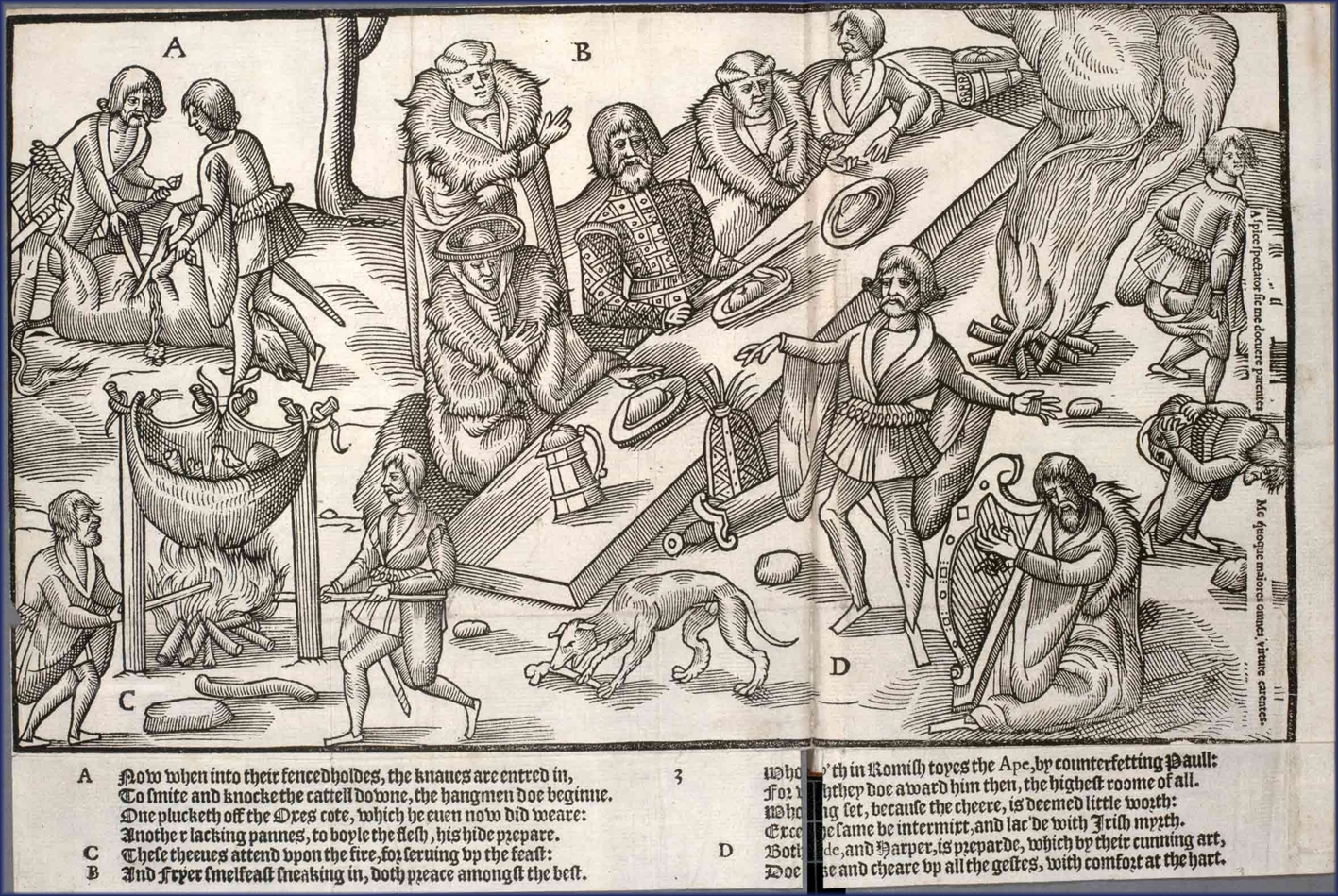
  The Irish Gaelic chieftain's feast, from The Image of Ireland
- 1579: The British navigator Sir Francis Drake passes through Maluku and transit in Ternate on his circumnavigation of the world. The Portuguese establish a fort on Tidore but the main centre for Portuguese activities in Maluku becomes Ambon.

=== 1580s ===
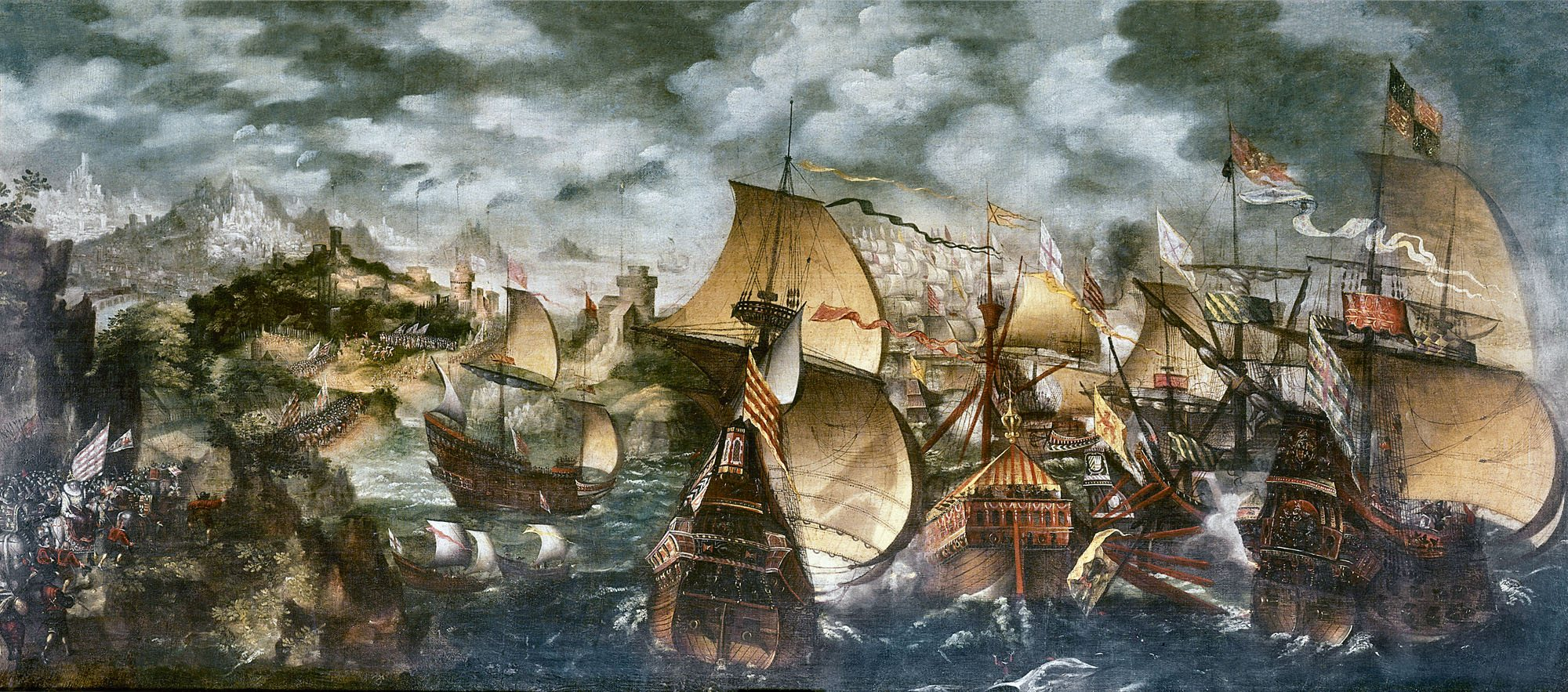
The fall of Spanish Armada

- 1580: Drake's royal reception after his attacks on Spanish possessions influences Philip II of Spain to build up the Spanish Armada. English ships in Spanish harbours are impounded.
- 1580: Spain unifies with Portugal under Philip II. The struggle for the throne of Portugal ends the Portuguese Empire. The Spanish and Portuguese crowns are united for 60 years, i.e. until 1640.
- 1580–1587: Nagasaki comes under control of the Jesuits.
- 1581: Dutch Act of Abjuration, declaring abjuring allegiance to Philip II of Spain.
- 1581: Bayinnaung dies at the age of 65.
- 1582: Oda Nobunaga commits seppuku during the Honnō-ji Incident coup by his general, Akechi Mitsuhide.
- 1582: Pope Gregory XIII issues the Gregorian calendar. The last day of the Julian calendar was Thursday, 4 October 1582 and this was followed by the first day of the Gregorian calendar, Friday, 15 October 1582
- 1582: Yermak Timofeyevich conquers the Siberia Khanate on behalf of the Stroganovs.
- 1583: Denmark builds the world's first theme park, Bakken.
- 1583: Death of Sultan Babullah of Ternate.
- 1584–1585: After the siege of Antwerp, many of its merchants flee to Amsterdam. According to Luc-Normand Tellier, "At its peak, between 1510 and 1557, Antwerp concentrated about 40% of the world trade...It is estimated that the port of Antwerp was earning the Spanish crown seven times more revenues than the Americas."
- 1584: Ki Ageng Pemanahan died. Sultan Pajang raised Sutawijaya, son of Ki Ageng Pemanahan as the new ruler in Mataram, titled "Loring Ngabehi Market" (because of his home in the north of the market).
- 1585: Akbar annexes Kashmir and adds it to the Kabul Subah
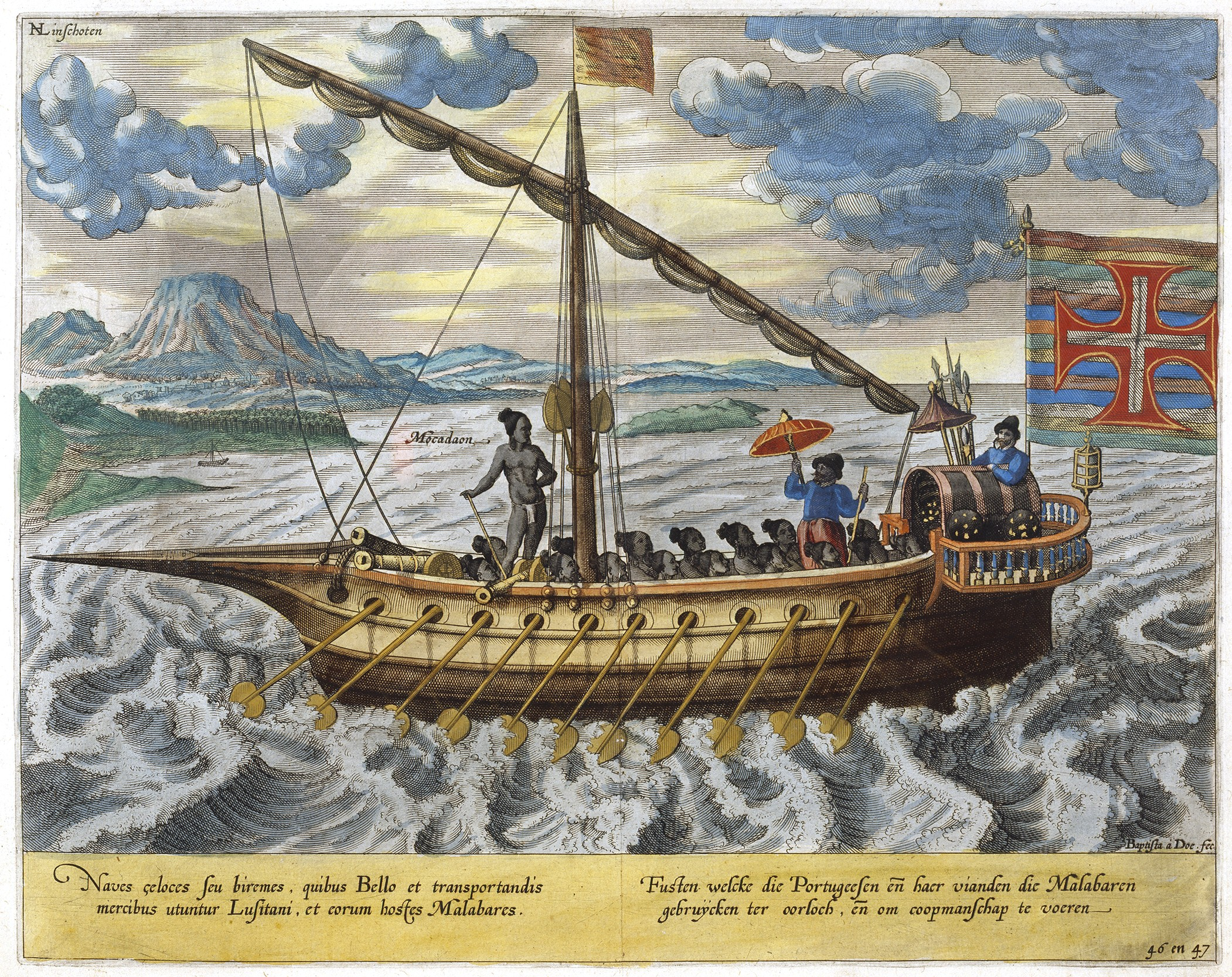
  Portuguese fusta in India from a book by Jan Huygen van Linschoten
- 1585: Colony at Roanoke founded in North America.
- 1585–1604: The Anglo-Spanish War is fought on both sides of the Atlantic.
- 1587: Mary, Queen of Scots is executed by Elizabeth I.
- 1587: The reign of Abbas I marks the zenith of the Safavid dynasty.
- 1587: Troops that would invade Pajang Mataram Sultanate storm ravaged the eruption of Mount Merapi. Sutawijaya and his men survived.
- 1588: Mataram into the kingdom with Sutawijaya as Sultan, titled "Senapati Ingalaga Sayidin Panatagama" means the warlord and cleric Manager Religious Life.
- 1588: England repulses the Spanish Armada.
- 1589: Spain repulses the English Armada.
- 1589: Catherine de' Medici dies at aged 69.

=== 1590–1600 ===
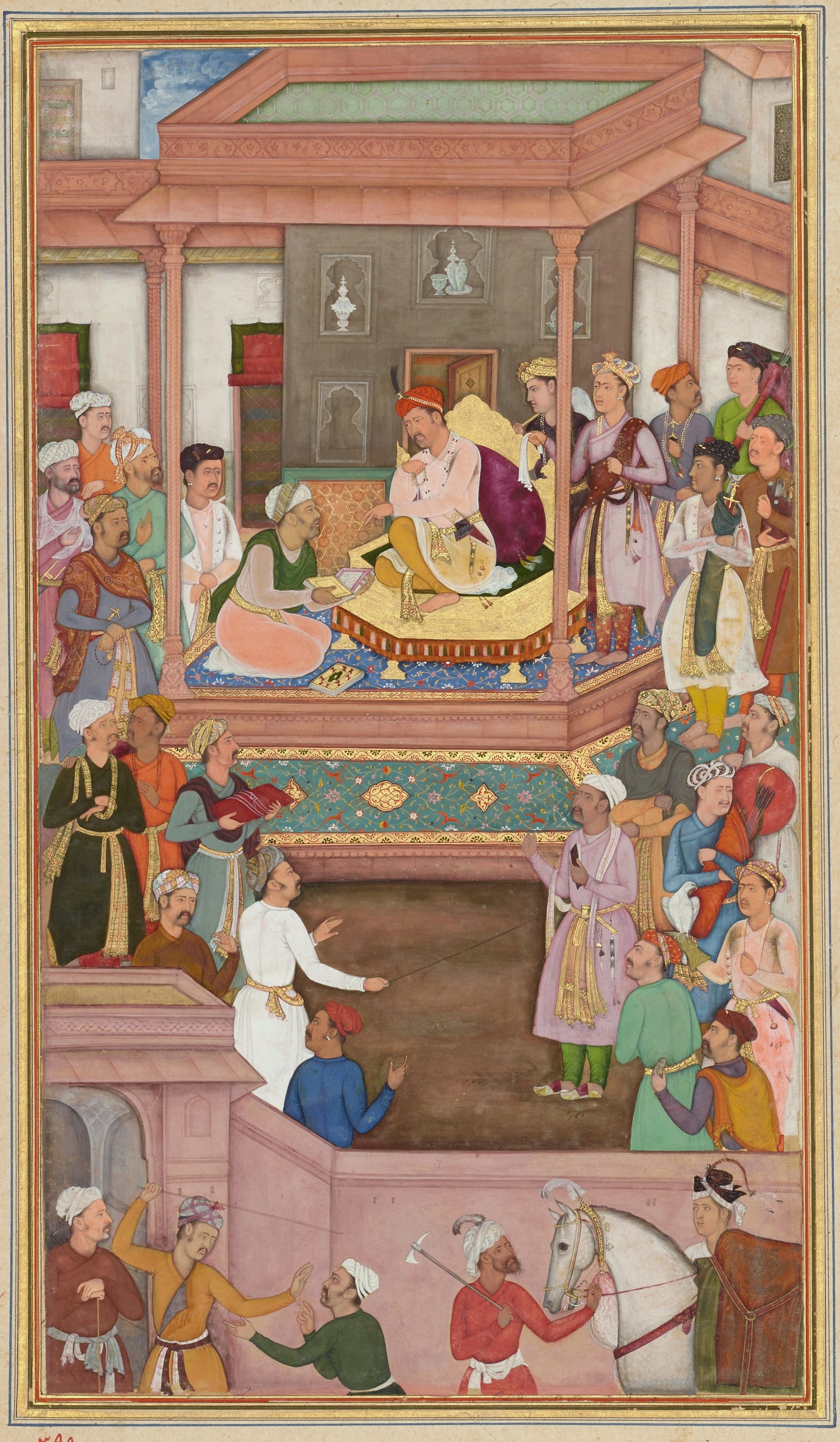
Abu'l-Fazl ibn Mubarak presenting Akbarnama to Mughal Azam Akbar, Mughal miniature

- 1590: Siege of Odawara: the Go-Hojo clan surrender to Toyotomi Hideyoshi, and Japan is unified.
- 1591: Gazi Giray leads a huge Tatar expedition against Moscow.
- 1591: In Mali, Moroccan forces of the Sultan Ahmad al-Mansur led by Judar Pasha defeat the Songhai Empire at the Battle of Tondibi.
- 1592–1593: John Stow reports 10,675 plague deaths in London, a city of approximately 200,000 people.
- 1592–1598: Korea, with the help of Ming dynasty China, repels two Japanese invasions.
- 1593–1606: The Long War between the Habsburg monarchy and the Ottoman Turks.
- 1594: St. Paul's College, Macau, founded by Alessandro Valignano.
- 1595: First Dutch expedition to Indonesia sets sail for the East Indies with two hundred and forty-nine men and sixty-four cannons led by Cornelis de Houtman.
- 1596: Birth of René Descartes.
- 1596: June, de Houtman's expedition reaches Banten the main pepper port of West Java where they clash with both the Portuguese and Indonesians. It then sails east along the north coast of Java losing twelve crew to a Javanese attack at Sidayu and killing a local ruler in Madura.
- 1597: Romeo and Juliet is published.
- 1597: Cornelis de Houtman's expedition returns to the Netherlands with enough spices to make a considerable profit.
- 1598: The Edict of Nantes ends the French Wars of Religion.
- 1598: Abbas I moves Safavids capital from Qazvin to Isfahan in 1598.
- 1598–1613: Russia descends into anarchy during the Time of Troubles.
- 1598: The Portuguese require an armada of 90 ships to put down a Solorese uprising. (to 1599)
- 1598: More Dutch fleets leave for Indonesia and most are profitable.
  Edo period screen depicting the Battle of Sekigahara
- 1598: The province of Santa Fe de Nuevo México is established in Northern New Spain. The region would later become a territory of Mexico, the New Mexico Territory in the United States, and the US State of New Mexico.
- 1598: Death of Toyotomi Hideyoshi, known as the unifier of Japan.
- 1599: The Mali Empire is defeated at the Battle of Jenné.
- 1599: The van Neck expedition returns to Europe. The expedition makes a 400 per cent profit. (to 1600)
- 1599: March, Leaving Europe the previous year, a fleet of eight ships under Jacob van Neck was the first Dutch fleet to reach the ‘Spice Islands’ of Maluku.
- 1600: Giordano Bruno is burned at the stake for heresy in Rome.
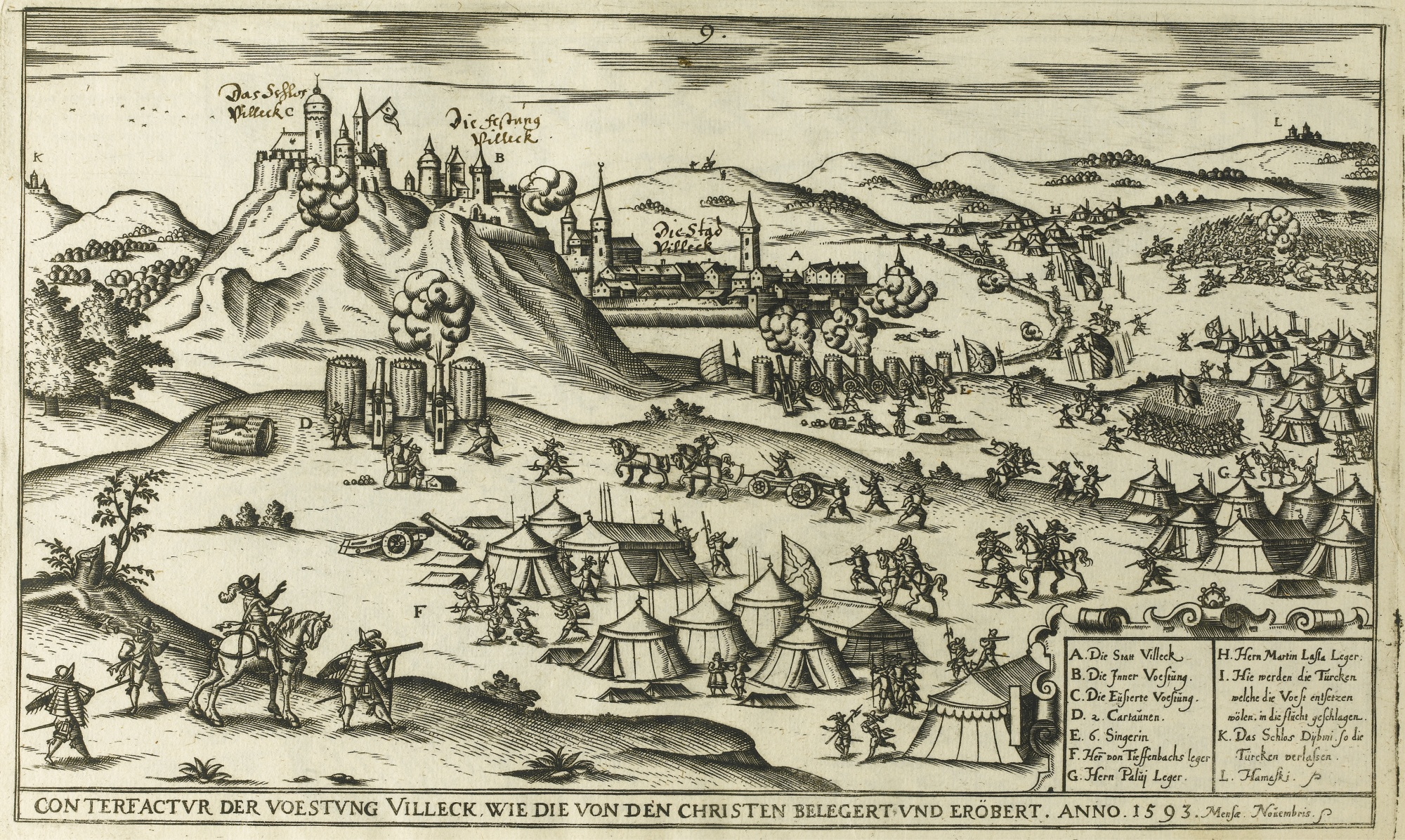
  Siege of Fiľakovo castle during the Long Turkish War
- 1600: Battle of Sekigahara in Japan. End of the Warring States period and beginning of the Edo period.
- 1600: The Portuguese win a major naval battle in the bay of Ambon. Later in the year, the Dutch join forces with the local Hituese in an anti-Portuguese alliance, in return for which the Dutch would have the sole right to purchase spices from Hitu.
- 1600: Elizabeth I grants a charter to the British East India Company beginning the English advance in Asia.
- 1600: Michael the Brave unifies the three principalities: Wallachia, Moldavia and Transylvania after the Battle of Șelimbăr from 1599.

=== Undated ===
- Polybius' The Histories translated into Italian, English, German and French.
- Mississippian culture disappears.
- Medallion rug, variant Star Ushak style, Anatolia (modern Turkey), is made. It is now kept at the Saint Louis Art Museum.

== Gallery ==
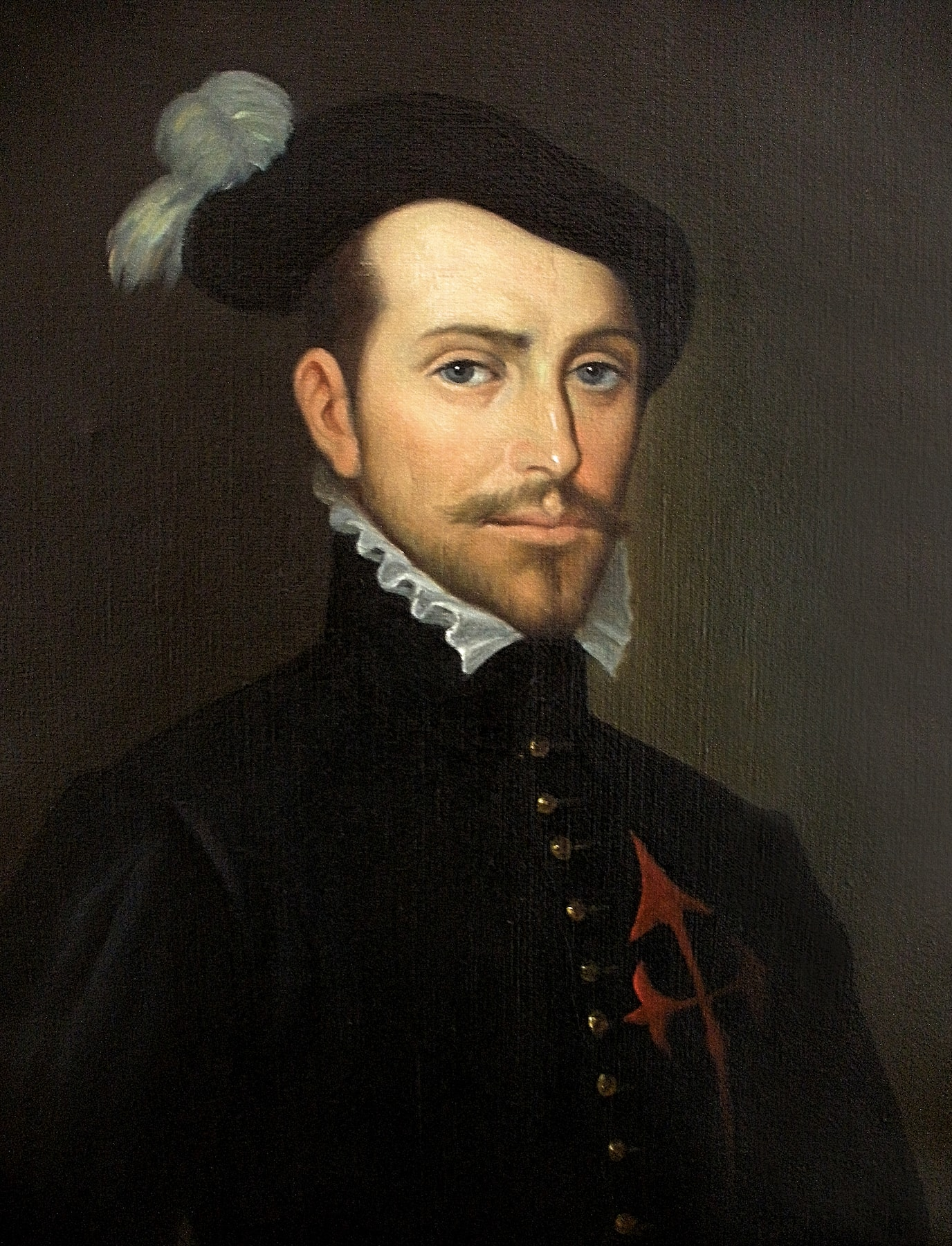
Hernan Cortes (1485–1547)

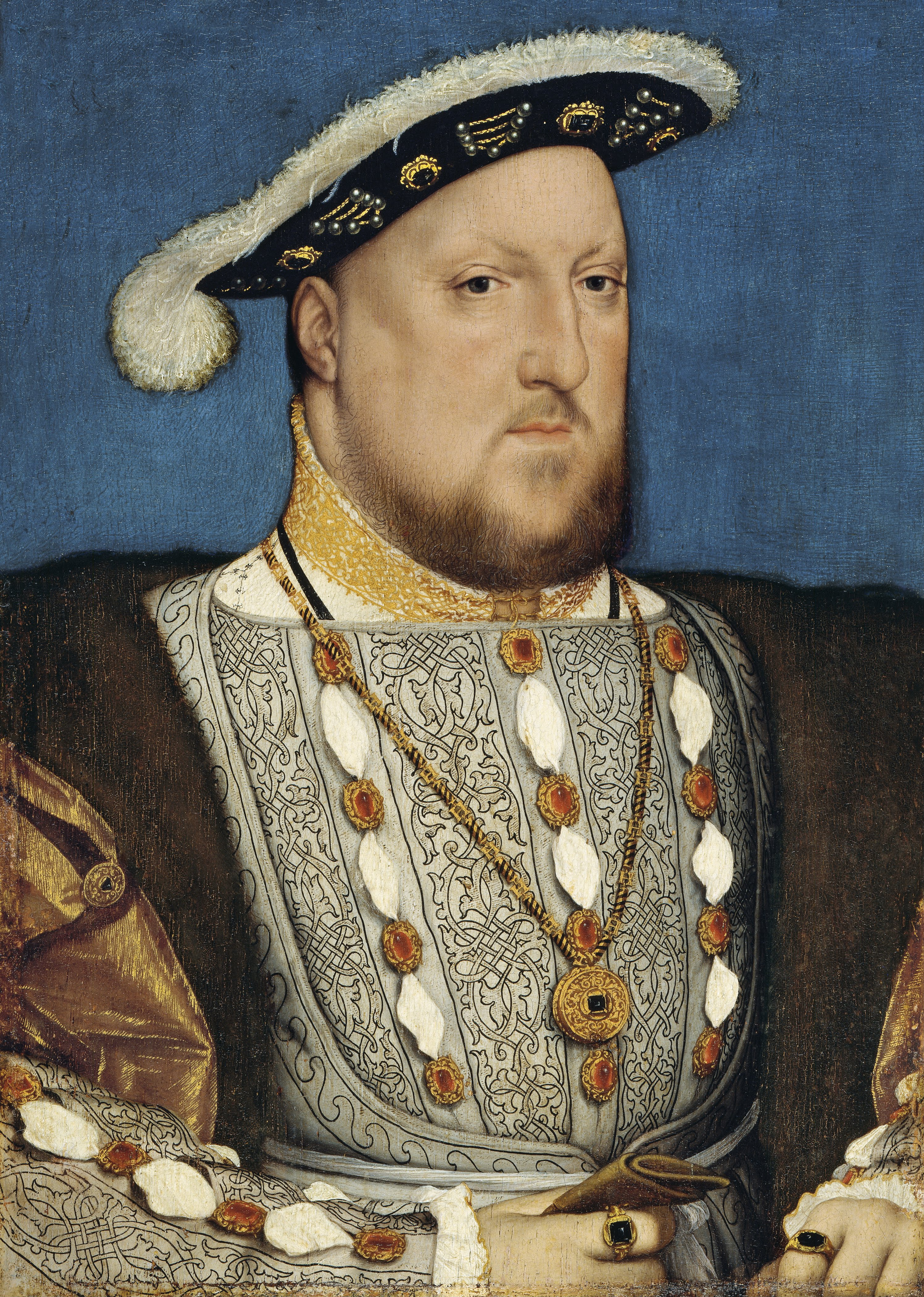
Henry VIII, (1491–1547) King of England and Ireland

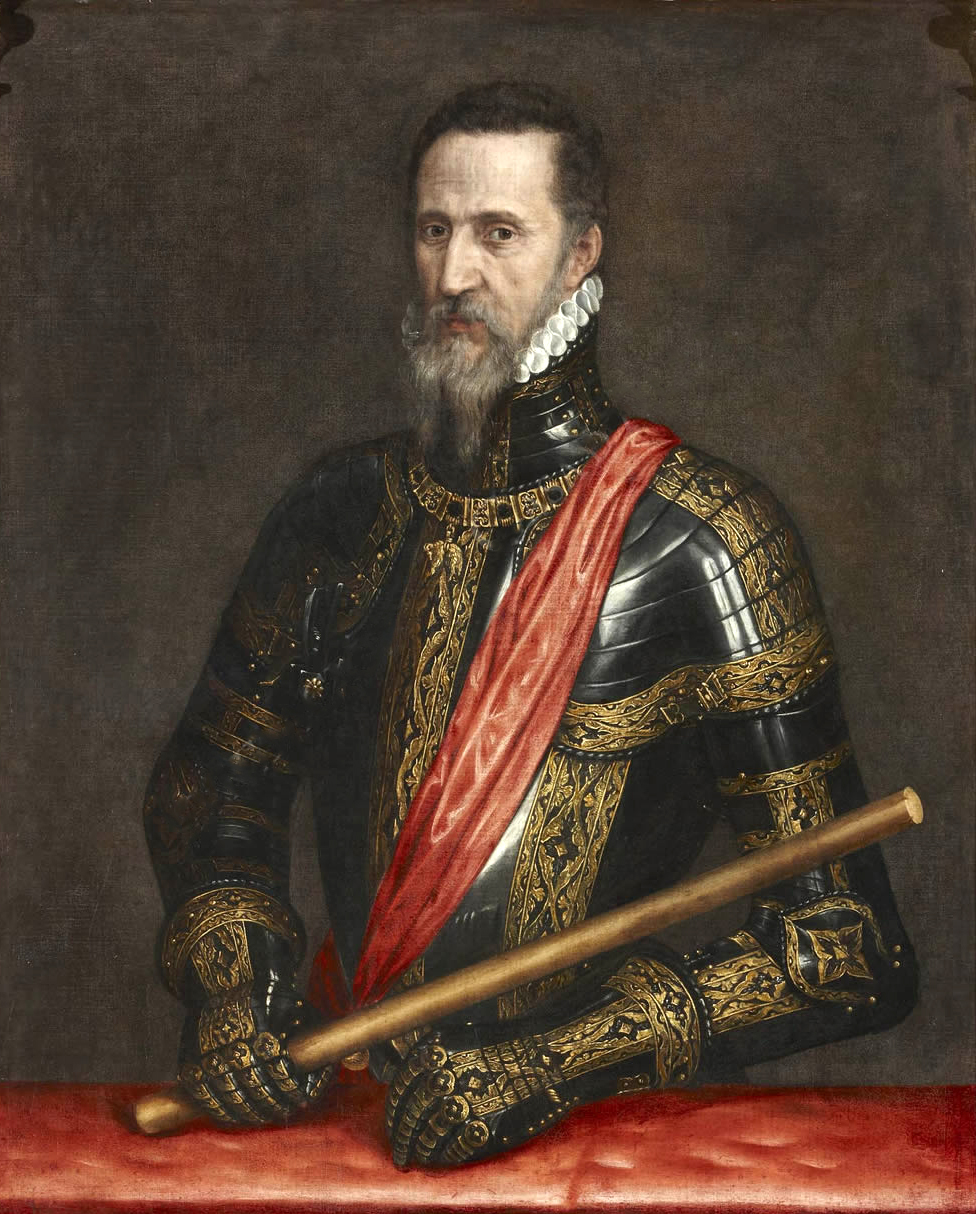
Don Fernando Álvarez de Toledo (1507–1582)

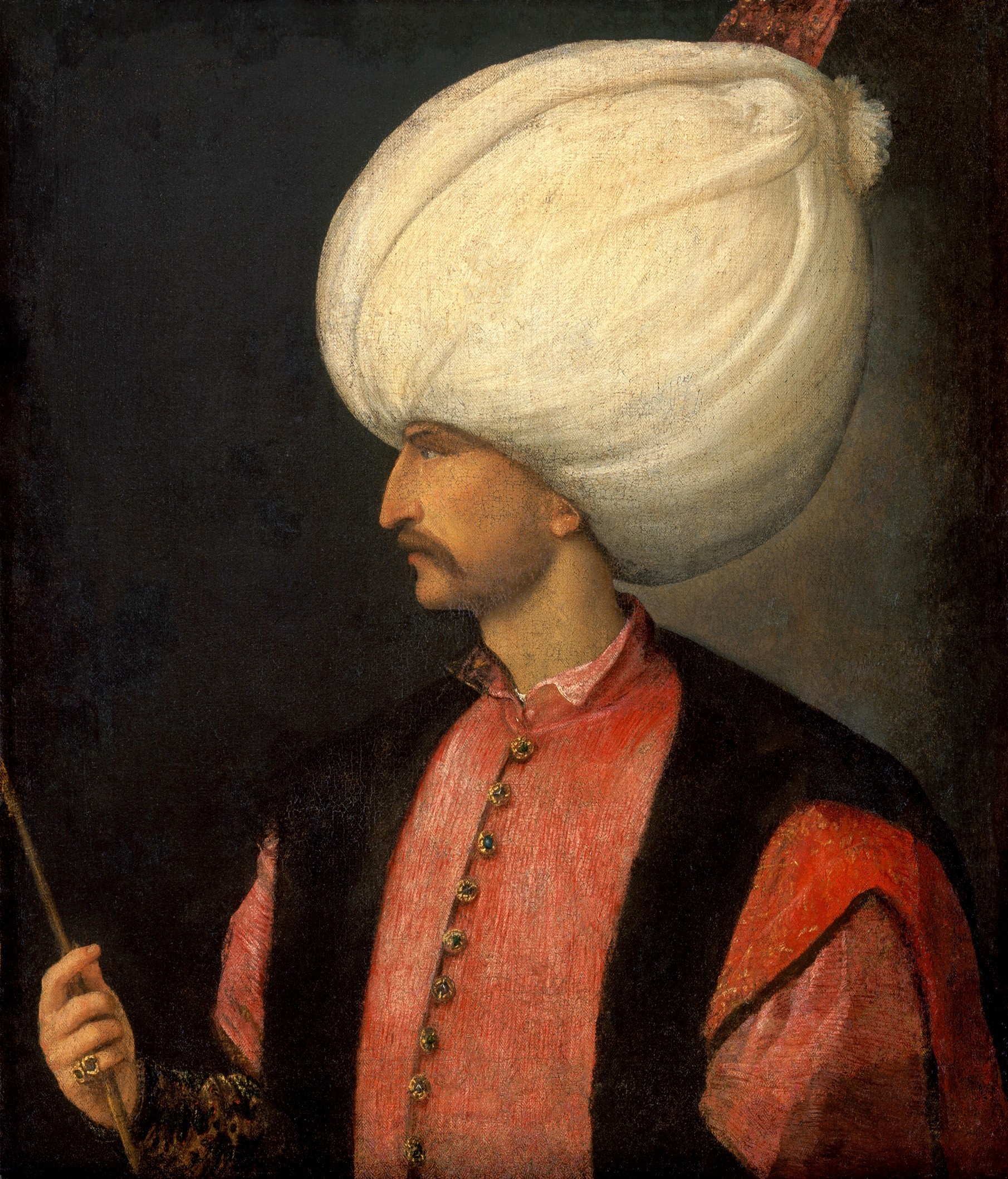
Suleiman the Magnificent, Sultan of the Ottoman Empire (1520–1566)

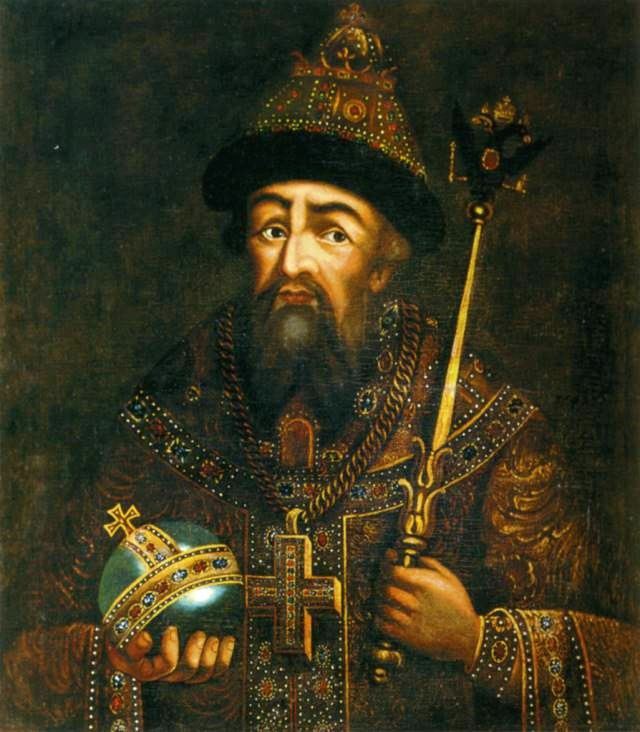
Ivan the Terrible (1530–1584)

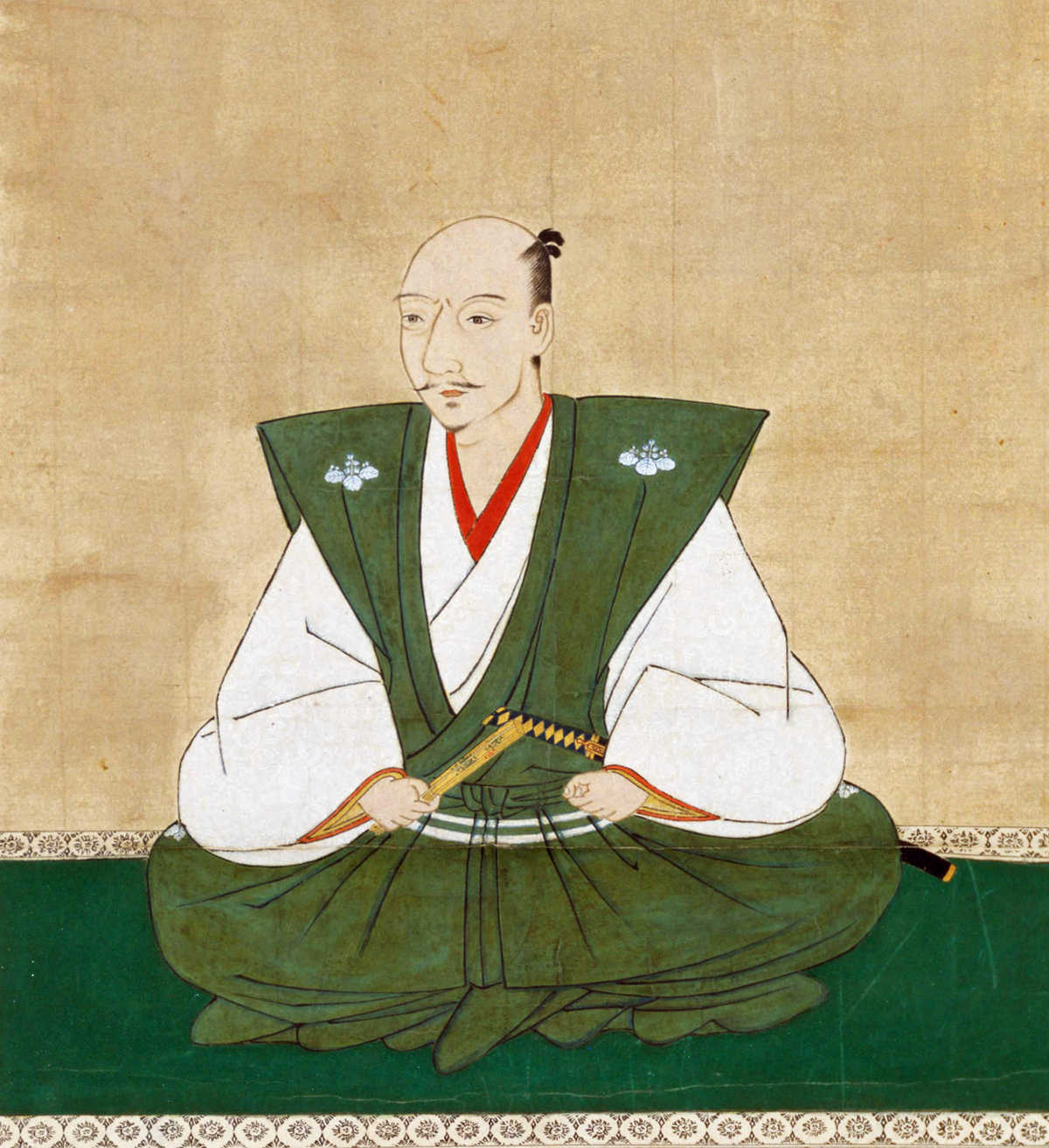
Oda Nobunaga (1534–1582)

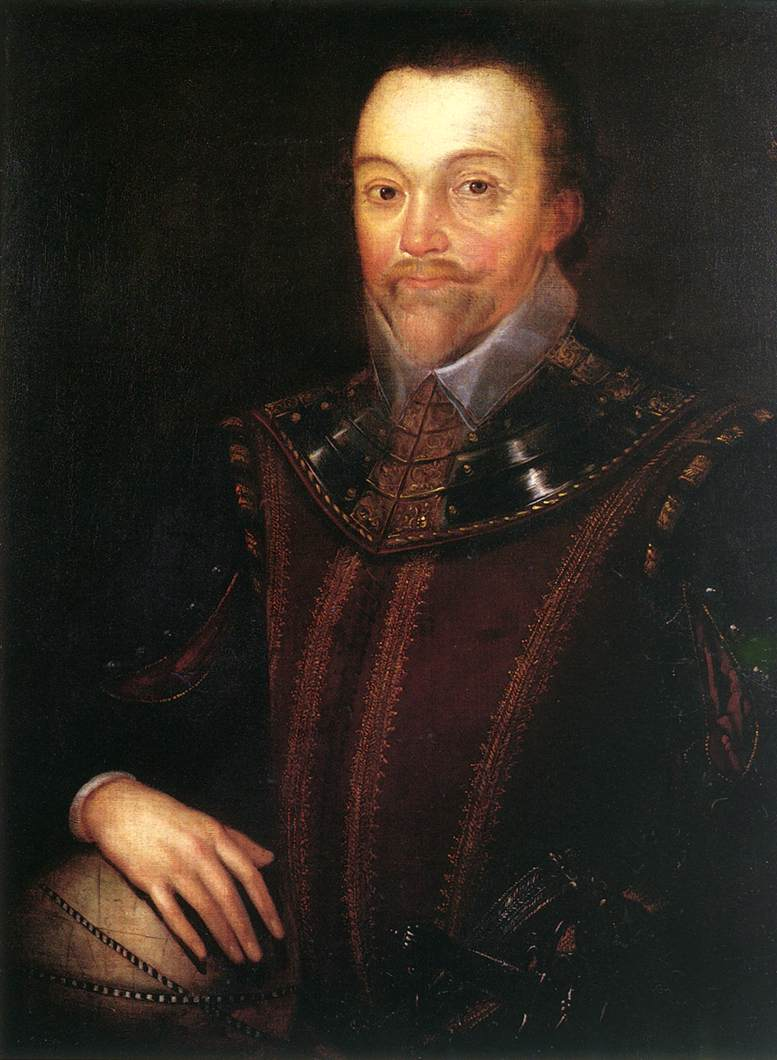
Sir Francis Drake (c. 1540 – 1596)

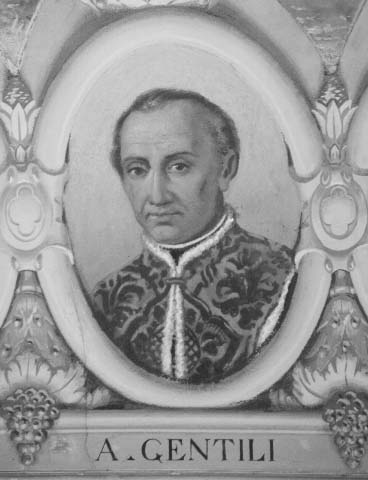
Alberico Gentili, (1552–1608) the Father of international law

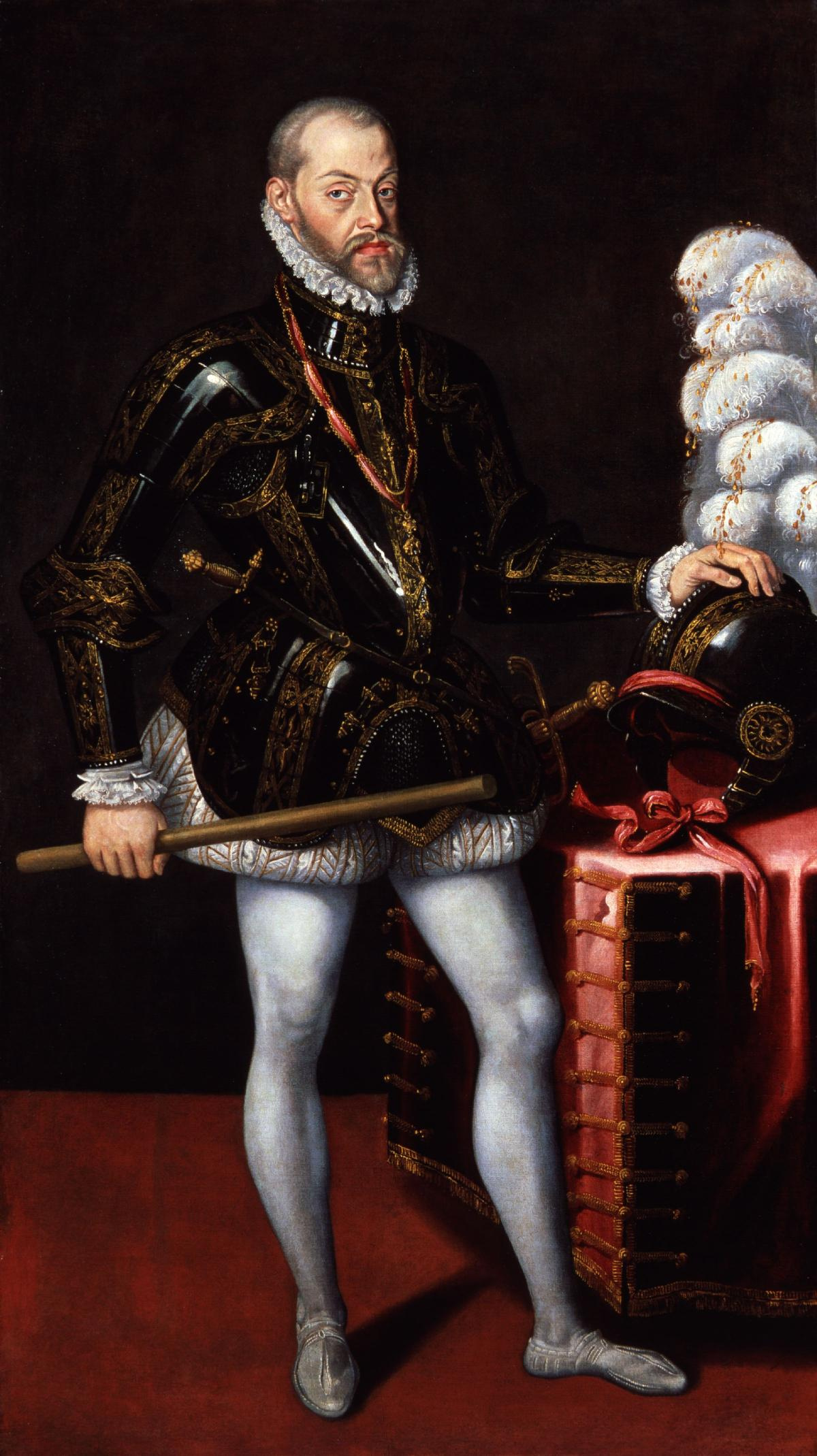
Philip II of Spain, King of Spain (1556–1598)

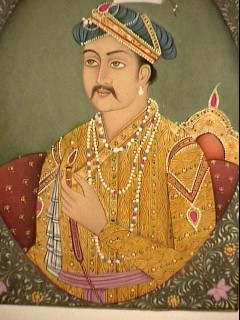
Akbar the Great, Mughal emperor (1556–1605)

== Inventions, discoveries, introductions ==
Related article: List of 16th century inventions.

- The Columbian Exchange introduces many plants, animals and diseases to the Old and New Worlds.
- Introduction of the spinning wheel revolutionizes textile production in Europe.
- The letter J is introduced into the English alphabet.
- The Age of Sail began, encompassing the period of roughly 1571–1862, when large, sail-powered wooden naval warships dominated the high seas, mounting a large variety of types and sizes of cannon as their main armament.
- 1500: First portable watch is created by Peter Henlein of Germany.
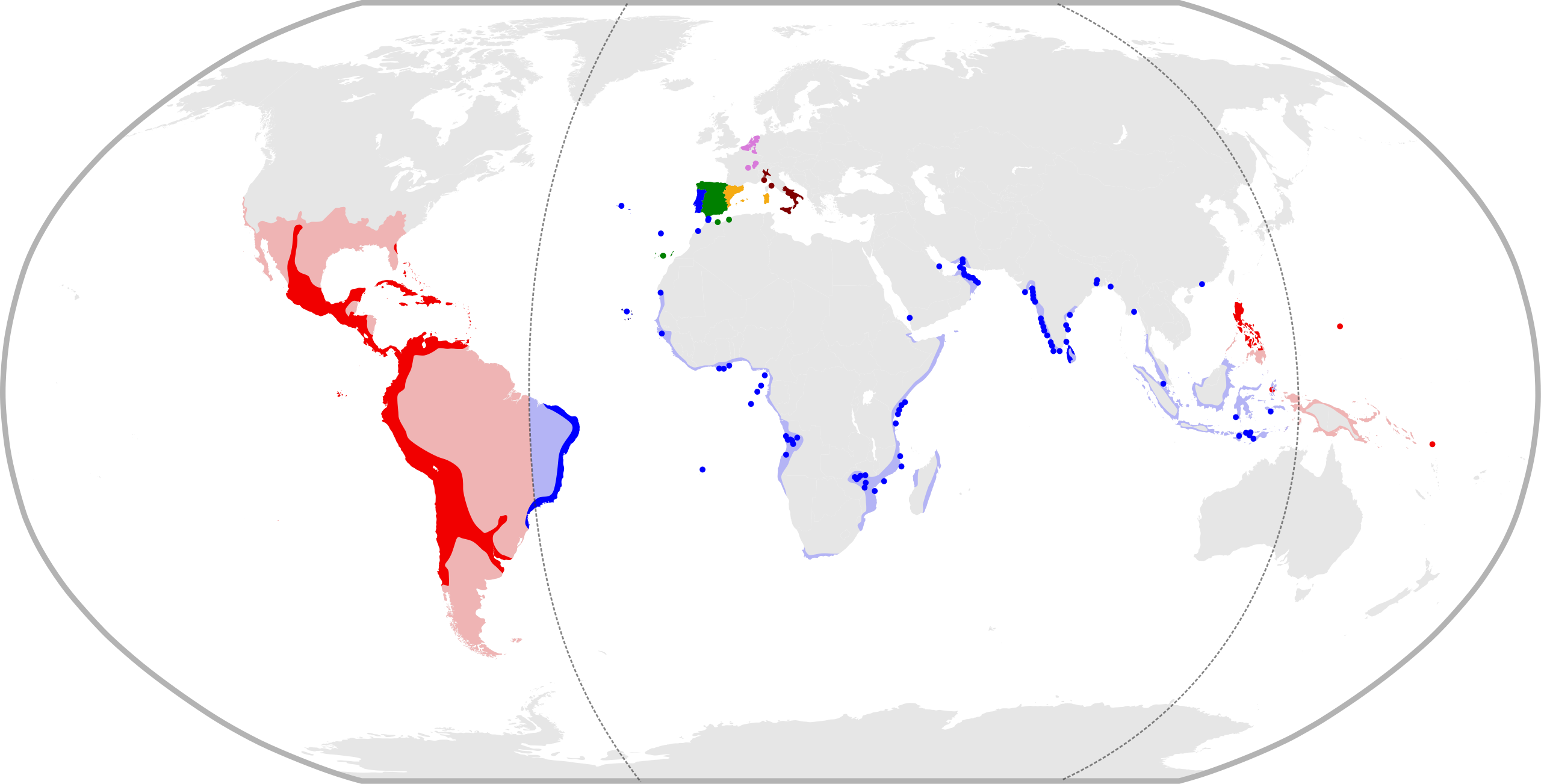
  The Iberian Union in 1598, under Philip II, King of Spain and Portugal
- 1513: Juan Ponce de León sights Florida and Vasco Núñez de Balboa sights the eastern edge of the Pacific Ocean.
- 1519–1522: Ferdinand Magellan and Juan Sebastián Elcano lead the first circumnavigation of the world.
- 1519–1540: In America, Hernando de Soto expeditions map the Gulf of Mexico coastline and bays.
- 1525: Modern square root symbol (√)
- 1540: Francisco Vásquez de Coronado sights the Grand Canyon.
- 1541–42: Francisco de Orellana sails the length of the Amazon River.
- 1542–43: Firearms are introduced into Japan by the Portuguese.
- 1543: Copernicus publishes his theory that the Earth and the other planets revolve around the Sun
- 1545: Theory of complex numbers is first developed by Gerolamo Cardano of Italy.
- 1558:
  - Camera obscura is first used in Europe by Giambattista della Porta of Italy.
  - The first edition of Giambattista della Porta's popular science book, Magia Naturalis, is published in Naples.
- 1559–1562: Spanish settlements in Alabama/Florida and Georgia confirm dangers of hurricanes and local native warring tribes.
- 1565: Spanish settlers outside New Spain (Mexico) colonize Florida's coastline at St. Augustine.
- 1565: Invention of the graphite pencil (in a wooden holder) by Conrad Gesner. Modernized in 1812.
- 1568: Gerardus Mercator creates the first Mercator projection map.
- 1572: Supernova SN 1572 is observed by Tycho Brahe in the Milky Way.
- 1582: Gregorian calendar is introduced in Europe by Pope Gregory XIII and adopted by Catholic countries.
- c. 1583: Galileo Galilei of Pisa, Italy identifies the constant swing of a pendulum, leading to development of reliable timekeepers.
- 1585: earliest known reference to the 'sailing carriage' in China.
- 1589: William Lee invents the stocking frame.
- 1591: First flush toilet is introduced by Sir John Harrington of England, the design published under the title 'The Metamorphosis of Ajax'.
- 1593: Galileo Galilei invents a thermometer.
- 1596: William Barents discovers Spitsbergen.
- 1597: Opera in Florence by Jacopo Peri.

== See also ==
- Entertainment in the 16th century
