= Entertainment in the 16th century =

British Entertainment in the 16th century included art, fencing, painting, the stocks and even executions.

While the 16th century and early 17th century squarely fall into the Renaissance period in Europe, that period was not only one of scientific and cultural advance, but also involved the development of changing forms of entertainment – both for the masses and for the elite.

Despite the great breadth of advancements in the arts during this time, the economic conditions of this period affected the types of entertainment available. There were three classes in society: A wealthy nobility, a merchant class, and the peasantry, who were typically poor.

== Aristocratic entertainment ==
The nobility could commission artisans to entertain them with works of art, music and theatre (Kareti, 1997). They would also enjoy or participate in the sports of fencing, falconry, horse riding and hunting; they enjoyed extravagant parties and dances, attended the opera house, and had the best seats in the theater. At that time Cricket was also a game associated with the nobility. In 1563, Lawrence Humphrey praised the five classic sports of Greece for the nobility – "whirling, leaping, casting the darte, wrestling, running" and derided "dauncing, fayninge to instrumentes, playe at dise, chesse, or tennes."

== Entertainment for merchants ==
The middle class of merchants, wrights, inn keepers and the like, would occasionally enjoy the fine arts, for example the theater. Blood sports were popular – including bear baiting, bull baiting, dog fighting and cockfighting. Travelling troupes of actors entertained the masses. Enterprising bards would settle and build theaters – such as William Shakespeare’s Globe Theater (The Old Globe Theater History, 2005) in London.

== Entertainment for the poor ==
The poor could rarely afford the theater, generally having to stand as groundlings. Executions were seen as a form of entertainment (Alchin, 2005), as was attending public humiliations in the stocks.

== Bibliography ==
- Kareti, K. "Elizabethan England". Springfield.k12.il.us. Archived from the original on 2017-07-17.
- "The OLD GLOBE THEATER History". William-shakespeare.info.
- Alchin, L.K. (July 16, 2005). "Executions and Beheading at the Tower of London". Castles.me.uk.
- Lambert, T. (2007). "The Witch Trials". Localhistories.org.
