= Princess Ning'an =

Princess Ning'an 寧安公主
- Born: 1539
- Died: 1607 (aged 67–68)
- Spouse: Li He (李和)
- Issue: Li Cheng'en (李承恩)
Names
- Zhu Luzheng (朱祿媜)
- House: Zhu
- Father: Jiajing Emperor
- Mother: Consort Duan

Princess Ning'an was a Ming dynasty princess and the third daughter of the Jiajing Emperor to survive infancy.

== Biography ==
The princess was born in 1539 to the Jiajing Emperor's favoured concubine Consort Duan, and given the personal name Luzheng. After the Renyin palace rebellion in 1542, Empress Fang sentenced Consort Duan to death by slow-slicing, however, it was later found that Consort Duan had not been involved with the uprising. Luzheng was only three years old at the time. After her mother's death, she was raised by Imperial Noble Consort Shen (沈).

Luzheng was granted the title Princess Ning'an in 1555, the same year that Li He of Ningjin County, Hebei as her husband. Only one of Princess Ning'an's children is recorded in the official histories; her son, Li Cheng'en. She later received the title of Dazhang (大长) Princess Ning'an.

== In fiction and popular culture ==
Portrayed by Fan Bingbing in the 2003 television series Famous Catcher in Kanto (名捕镇关东).
