= Empress Chen (Jiajing) =

Empress of China from 1522 to 1528

Empress Xiaojiesu 孝潔肅皇后
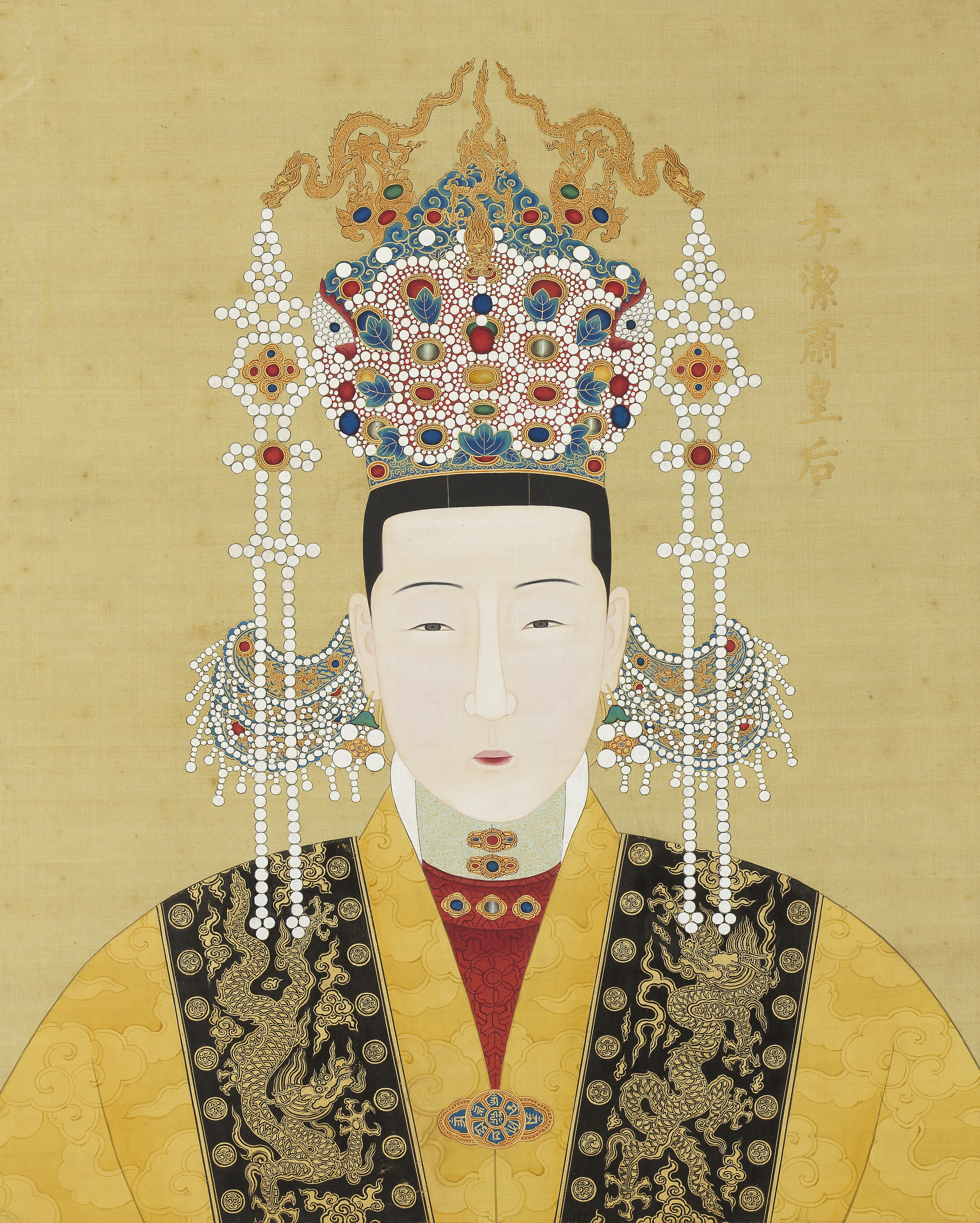

Empress consort of the Ming dynasty
- Tenure: 1522–1528
- Predecessor: Empress Xiaojingyi
- Successor: Empress Zhang
- Born: 1508; Yuancheng County, Zhili (present-day Daming County, Hebei)
- Died: 1528 (aged 19–20)
- Burial: Tianshou Mountain (before 1567); Yong Mausoleum (after 1567)
- Spouse: Jiajing Emperor (m. 1522)
Posthumous name
- Empress Xiaojie Gongyi Cirui Anzhuang Xiangtian Yisheng Su (孝潔恭懿慈睿安莊相天翊聖肅皇后)
- Clan: Chen (陳)
- Father: Chen Wanyan (陳萬言)

Empress Xiaojiesu (1508–1528), of the Chen clan, was a Chinese empress consort of the Ming dynasty, first empress to the Jiajing Emperor.

She was the daughter of a local scholar named Chen Wanyang (d. 1535). She was selected in to the palace of the Jiajing Emperor in 1522. Later that year, she was appointed empress upon the wish of the emperor's aunt, the Empress Dowager Zhang. Because of the tense personal relationship between the Emperor and his aunt, however, he did not take a liking to Chen. In 1528, she became pregnant. During her pregnancy, the Emperor kicked her repeatedly in a fit of rage and caused her to fatally miscarry.

The Emperor did not permit her to be buried in the imperial mausoleum: this was not done before 1567.

== Titles ==
- During the reign of the Zhengde Emperor (r. 1505–1521)
  - Lady Chen (陳氏; from 1508)
- During the reign of the Jiajing Emperor (r. 1521–1567)
  - Empress (皇后; from September 1521)
  - Empress Daoling (悼靈皇后, from October 1528)
  - Empress Xiaojie (孝潔皇后; from 1536)
- During the reign of the Longqing Emperor (r. 1567– 1572)
  - Empress Xiaojie Gongyi Cirui Anzhuang Xiangtian Yisheng Su (孝潔恭懿慈睿安莊相天翊聖肅皇后; from 1567)

== Issue ==
- As empress:
  - Miscarriage (1528)

== Notes ==
Chinese royalty
Preceded by Empress Xiaojingyi	Empress consort of China; 1522–1528	Succeeded by Empress Zhang
