= Empress Zhang (Jiajing) =

Empress of China from 1528 to 1534

Zhang Qijie 張七姐

Empress consort of the Ming dynasty
- Tenure: 1528–1534
- Predecessor: Empress Xiaojiesu
- Successor: Empress Xiaolie
- Died: 1537; Beijing
- Burial: Jinshan, Beijing
- Spouse: Jiajing Emperor (m. 1522)
- Clan: Zhang (張)
- Father: Zhang Ji (張楫)
- Mother: Lady Xue (薛氏)

Empress Zhang (died 1537), personal name Zhang Qijie (張七姐), was a Chinese empress consort of the Ming dynasty, second empress to the Jiajing Emperor. She was deprived of the title empress in 1534 because of conflicts within the family.

Empress Zhang was the daughter of a member of the Imperial guard. She was selected for the imperial harem in 1526. When the empress died in 1528, Zhang was chosen to replace her as empress on 8 January 1529. In 1534, she was deposed from her position as empress. No official reason was given. Unofficially, however, the reason was that the emperor disliked her favor with the Empress Xiaochengjing. She died three years after her demotion.

== Titles ==
- During the reign of the Zhengde Emperor (r. 1505–1521)
  - Lady Zhang (張氏)
- During the reign of the Jiajing Emperor (r. 1521–1567)
  - Consort Shun (順妃; from 1522)
  - Empress (皇后; from 1528)

== Notes ==
Chinese royalty
Preceded by Empress Xiaojiesu	Empress consort of China; 1528–1534	Succeeded by Empress Xiaolie
