= Empress Xiaolie =

Empress Xiaolie may refer to:

- Xiao Sagezhi (died 951), Empress Shizong of Liao's empress whose first posthumous name was Empress Xiaolie
- Empress Fang (1516–1547), wife of the Jiajing Emperor whose posthumous name was Empress Xiaolie
- Lady Abahai (1590–1626), Nurhaci's consort whose posthumous name was Empress Xiaolie Wu
