= Wang Mantang =

Wang Mantang 王滿堂
- Born: Bazhou, China
- Spouse: Zhengde Emperor

Wang Mantang (王满堂; 1471 – 1541), was a renowned beauty from Bazhou and an unofficial consort of the Zhengde Emperor. She is known for being called the Washing Clothes Empress (浣衣皇后).

== Biography ==
Despite the strict restrictions placed on women during the Ming dynasty, Wang Mantang's behavior was rebellious and was encouraged by her father. Her father was a writer for court judges and had several connections around town. When Wang Mantang grew up, she was known for her beauty and uniqueness.

The Zhengde Emperor liked to frequent brothels and created palaces called "Bao Fang" (豹房) outside the Imperial Palace for exotic animals such as tigers and leopards. He later used these palaces to house women, and as a result, searched for beautiful women. Wang Mantang wanted an opportunity to be his consort and went to the imperial selection. However, her young age and inexperience led to her not being selected to serve the emperor. Wang Mantang returned to home to the disappointment of her parents.

One day, she had a dream about becoming empress. Her father believed this as fate, and he told a monk about Wang Mantang's dream. The monk told his friend Duan Chang (段𬬮) about her prediction, and he believed it. Duan Chang had ambitions of becoming the emperor and faked his identity by using a prosperous name. Duan Chang approached Wang Mantang's father, who was delighted. Wang Mantang and Duan Chang soon married, and it was only after marriage that Wang Mantang's parents found out Duan Chang was in fact, a poor villager. Duan Chang spread the news that he was married to a future empress and the local villagers gathered around them for blessings.

The emperor heard of this incident, and he told his general to figure out who was causing the commotion. The general predicted a rebellion, but instead discovered Duan Chang wearing the emperor's robes. The emperor enslaved Wang Mantang and her husband. Along the way to the Inner City, the emperor took interest of Wang Mantang. He was going to let her reside in a Bao Fang, but she was thrown into the Imperial Palace's washing department. They later reunited and the emperor promised to make her empress and replace Empress Xia. He never achieved this promise since he soon died as a result of drowning. His successor, the Jiajing Emperor gave the Zhengde Emperor's consorts the title of consort dowagers. Since Wang Mantang didn't receive a title, she was forced to return to the washing department and was known by other palace maids as the Washing Clothes Empress.
