= Iron comb =

Iron comb may refer to:

- An iron comb used for combing wool
- A similar or identical instrument used for combing, a form of torture
- A hot comb used for straightening human hair
