= Zhaosi Hall =

Shuofang Town cultural site

- 昭嗣堂
- Interactive map of the Zhaosi Hall area
- Former names: Xiangnan ting (香楠廳)
- Alternative names: Fragrant Cedar Pavilion

General information
- Status: Major Historical and Cultural Site Protected at the National Level
- Type: Pavilion
- Architectural style: Ming dynasty, Jiangnan courtyard style
- Location: Yu'an Road, Shuofang Residential District, Wuxi, Jiangsu Province, China
- Coordinates: 31.452075°N 120.452084°E

Zhaosi Hall
- Traditional Chinese: 昭嗣堂
- Simplified Chinese: 昭嗣堂
Transcriptions
Standard Mandarin
- Hanyu Pinyin: Zhāosì táng
- Bopomofo: ㄓㄠ ㄙˋ ㄊㄤˊ
- Wade–Giles: Chao Ssu T'ang

Xiangnan ting
- Traditional Chinese: 香楠廳
- Simplified Chinese: 香楠厅
Transcriptions
Standard Mandarin
- Hanyu Pinyin: Xiāngnán tīng
- Bopomofo: ㄒㄧㄤ ㄋㄢˊ ㄊㄧㄥ
- Wade–Giles: Hsiang Nan T'ing

Zhaosi Hall is a cultural site protected at the national level in Shuofang Town, Wuxi, People's Republic of China.

== History ==
Zhaosi Hall was built by the father of Consort Duan, a Ming dynasty concubine of the Jiajing Emperor. The building was completed in 1528 and today lies in front of the home of the Cao family of Shuofang district. In 1748, descendants of the Cao family designated the building as an ancestral shrine.

Zhaosi Hall was designated a Cultural Site Protected at the Provincial Level (Chinese: 省级文物保护单位) in 1995.

== Architecture ==
Zhaosi Hall is typical of a Ming dynasty Jiangsu style courtyard house. The central hall is five rooms across, with a hill-shaped roof. The entire building is made from a very expensive and rare type of local cedar wood.

== Consort Duan's burial ==
In 2013, archaeologists observed that a stone archway near to Zhaosi Hall was built in the style of an imperial memorial, but lacked an inscription. Local people reported that there had been a grave tumulus near the arch that had been levelled, suggesting that the individual buried there was the recipient of an imperial, uninscribed memorial. Additionally, the word cedar (Chinese: 楠; pinyin: nán) in the original name Xiangnan ting sounds similar to the word for daughter in the local dialect (Chinese: 囡; pinyin: nān). Consequently, the archway is popularly believed to have been erected by Cao Ji in memory of his daughter.
