= Consort Duan =

Ming dynasty concubine of the Jiajing Emperor (died 1542)

Consort Duan 端妃
- Born: Wuxi, Jiangxi
- Died: 1542; Shuntian
- Spouse: Jiajing Emperor
- Issue: Princess Chang'an; Princess Ning'an
- Clan: Cao (曹)
- Father: Cao Cha (曹察)

Consort Duan (曹端妃; d. 1542), of the Cao clan, was a Ming dynasty concubine of the Jiajing Emperor. She was one of the emperor's most beloved concubines, but was implicated in an assassination attempt and subsequently executed.

== Biography ==
Cao was born the daughter of an official in Wuxi, modern Jiangsu Province. It is unknown when she entered the Ming Palace, but she was initially titled Lady Cao (Chinese: 淑人曹氏).

In 1536, Lady Cao gave birth to the emperor's first daughter, Shouying (Chinese: 壽媖), Princess Chang'an. The same year, she was promoted to Imperial Concubine Duan (Chinese: 端嬪) and her father was made a member of the Jinyiwei with authority over 1,000 households. After the first month of his daughter's birth, the emperor held a lavish feast to celebrate.

In 1537, Imperial Concubine Duan was promoted to Consort Duan. She gave birth to the emperor's third daughter in 1539, Luzheng (Chinese: 禄媜).

== Palace women uprising ==
On 27 November 1542, a group of palace women attempted to murder the emperor when he was staying in Consort Duan's quarters. They pretended to wait on him whilst there, tied a rope around his neck and attempted to strangle him. They failed to do so and, in the meantime, a palace woman named Zhang Jinlian (Chinese: 張金蓮) alerted Empress Fang. The palace eunuchs revived the emperor and arrested the palace women.

After the attack, the Jiajing Emperor was unconscious for several days, so Empress Fang ordered the palace women executed. As the attack had taken place in Consort Duan's palace, the empress determined that she had conspired with the palace women and sentenced her to death by slow slicing in the marketplace. Her body was then displayed, alongside those of Imperial Concubine Ning and the other palace women. 10 members of the women's families were also beheaded, while a further 20 were enslaved and given to ministers. It was later determined that Consort Duan had not been involved, but she was not granted a posthumous title.

== Burial ==
Zhaosi Hall, a national-level protected site near Shuofang in Wuxi New Area, was owned by Consort Duan's father. An archway near to it is built in the style of an imperial memorial, but has no inscription. Local people reported the presence of a grave tumulus near the arch that had been levelled and, as cedar (Chinese: 楠; pinyin: nán) sounds similar to the local dialect's word for daughter (Chinese: 囡; pinyin: nān), the archway is popularly believed to have been erected by Cao in memory of his daughter.

== Titles ==
- During the reign of the Zhengde Emperor (r. 1505–1521)
  - Lady Cao (曹氏; from Unknown Date)
- During the reign of the Jiajing Emperor (r. 1521–1567)
  - Woman of Gentleness (淑女: from Before 1535)
  - Concubine Duan (端嫔; from 1535)
  - Consort Duan (端妃; from 1537)

== Issues ==
As Concubine Duan:

- Zhu Shaoying, Princess Chang'an (常安公主 朱壽媖; 1536–1549), Jiajing's first daughter

As Consort Duan:

- Zhu Luzheng, Princess Ning'an (寧安公主 朱祿媜; 1539–1607), Jiajing's third daughter
