= Lingchi =

Archaic Chinese method of torture and execution

Chinese name
- Traditional Chinese: 凌遲
- Simplified Chinese: 凌迟
Transcriptions
Standard Mandarin
- Hanyu Pinyin: língchí
- Wade–Giles: ling^{2}-ch'ih^{2}
- IPA: [lǐŋ.ʈʂʰɨ̌]
Yue: Cantonese
- Yale Romanization: lìhng-chìh
- Jyutping: ling^{4}-ci^{4}
- IPA: [lɪŋ˩.tsʰi˩]
Southern Min
- Tâi-lô: lêng-tî

Vietnamese name
- Vietnamese alphabet: tùng xẻo lăng trì
- Hán-Nôm: 叢刟 凌遲

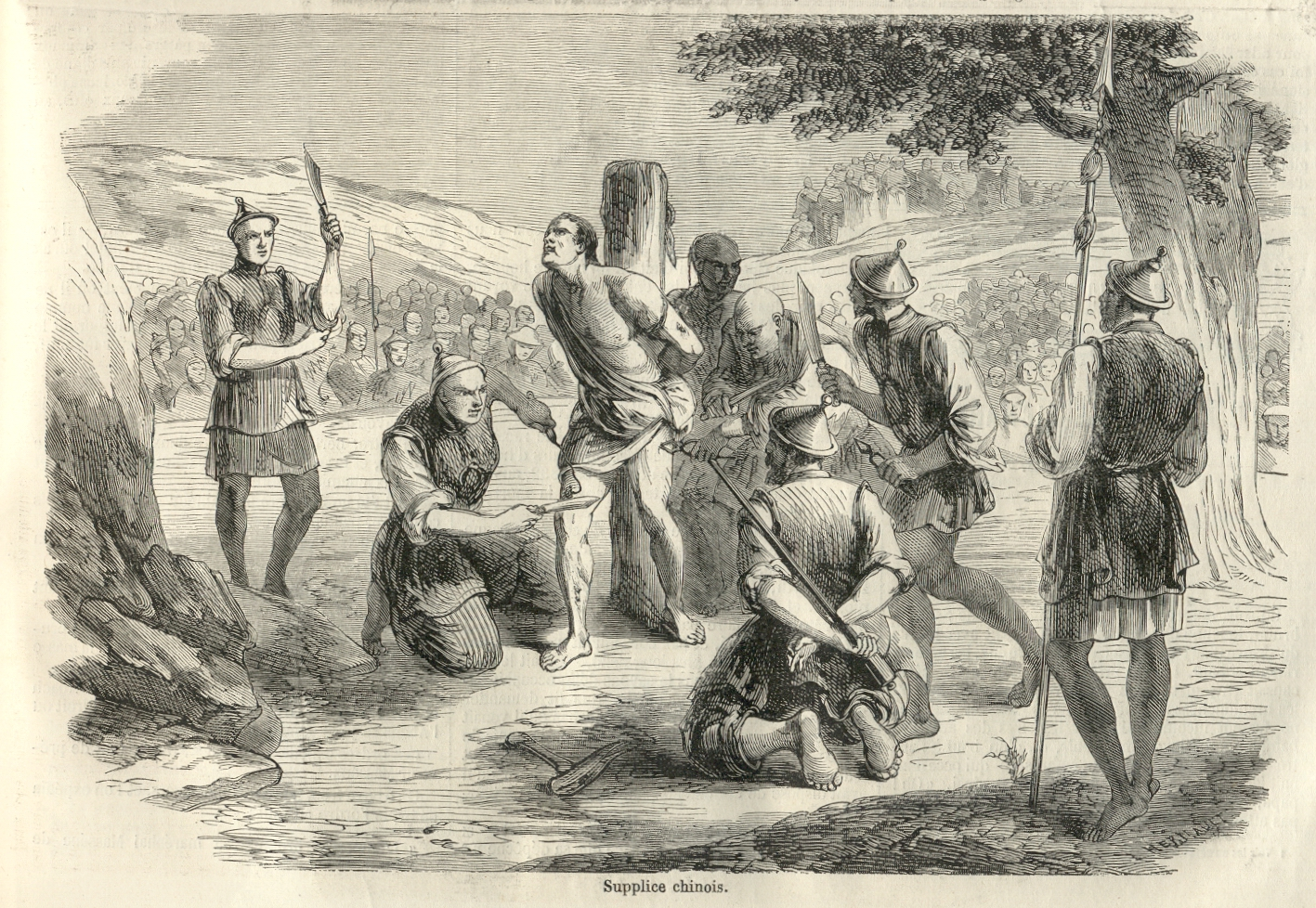
An 1858 illustration from the French newspaper Le Monde illustré, of the lingchi execution of a French missionary, Auguste Chapdelaine, in China

Lingchi (IPA: [lǐŋ.ʈʂʰɨ̌], Chinese: 凌遲), usually translated "slow slicing" or (incorrectly) "death by a thousand cuts", is a form of torture and execution that was used in China from c. 900 until it was banned in 1905. It was also used in Vietnam and Korea. In this form of execution, a knife is used to methodically remove portions of the body over an extended period of time, eventually resulting in death. Lingchi was reserved for crimes viewed as especially heinous, such as treason. Even after the practice was outlawed, the concept itself has still appeared across many types of media.

== Etymology ==
The word was used to describe the prolonging of a person's agony when the person is being killed. One theory suggests that it grew to be a specific torture technique. An alternative theory suggests that the term originated from the Khitan language, as the penal meaning of the word emerged during the Khitan Liao dynasty.

== Description ==
The process involved tying the condemned prisoner to a wooden frame, usually in a public place. The prisoner's flesh was then progressively sliced off from the body in a process that was not specified in detail in Chinese law, and therefore most likely varied. The punishment worked on three levels: as a form of public humiliation, as a slow and lingering death, and as a punishment after death.

According to the Confucian principle of filial piety, to alter one's body or to cut the body are considered unfilial practices. Lingchi therefore contravenes the demands of filial piety. In addition, to be cut to pieces meant that the body of the victim would not be "whole" in spiritual life after death. This method of execution became a fixture in the image of China among some Westerners.

Lingchi could be used for the torture and execution of a person, or applied as an act of humiliation after death. It was meted out for major offences such as high treason, mass murder, patricide/matricide, or the murder of one's master or employer (once-known as petty treason, in English). However, emperors used it to threaten people and sometimes ordered it for minor offences or for family members of their enemies.

While it is difficult to obtain accurate details of how the executions took place, they generally consisted of cuts to the arms, legs, and chest, leading to amputation of limbs, followed by decapitation or a stab to the heart. If the crime was less serious or the executioner merciful, the first cut would be to the throat causing death; subsequent cuts served solely to dismember the corpse. The family of the condemned could sometimes offer—were they able to afford it—a bribe in order to have a stab to the heart inflicted first.

Art historian James Elkins argues that extant photos of the execution clearly show that the "death by division" (as it was termed by German criminologist Robert Heindl) involved some degree of dismemberment while the subject was living. Elkins also argues that, contrary to the apocryphal version of "death by a thousand cuts", the actual process could not have lasted long. The condemned individual is not likely to have remained conscious and aware (even if still alive) after one or two severe wounds, so the entire process could not have included more than a "few dozen" wounds.

In the Yuan dynasty, 100 cuts were inflicted but by the Ming dynasty there were records of 3,000 incisions. A mid-19th-century account, conversely, describes the process as being a relatively quick one—lasting no longer than four or five minutes. Some emperors ordered three days of cutting while others may have ordered specific tortures before the execution, or a longer execution. For example, records showed that during Yuan Chonghuan's execution, Yuan was heard shouting for half a day before his death.

The flesh of the victims may also have been sold as medicine. As an official punishment, death by slicing may also have involved slicing the bones, cremation, and scattering of the deceased's ashes.

Both men and women could be sentenced to this punishment. In a Peking Gazette of 1879, a case mentioned a married woman and her lover who brutally murdered her father-in-law, fearing he would expose their affair and lead to harsh punishment according to Qing era's anti-adultery law. Consequently, the woman was executed by lingchi, and her paramour by decapitation. The husband of the woman was exposed in the cangue for not exercising proper control over his wife.

== History ==
Execution of Joseph Marchand in Vietnam, 1835

Lingchi existed under the earliest emperors, although similar but less cruel tortures were often prescribed instead. During the reign of Qin Er Shi, the second emperor of the Qin dynasty, various tortures were used to punish officials. The arbitrary, cruel, and short-lived Liu Ziye was apt to kill innocent officials by lingchi. Gao Yang killed only six people by this method, and An Lushan killed only one man. Lingchi was known in the Five Dynasties period (907–960); but, in one of the earliest such acts, Shi Jingtang abolished it. Other rulers continued to use it.

The method was prescribed in the Liao dynasty law codes, and was sometimes used. Emperor Tianzuo often executed people in this way during his rule. It became more widely used in the Song dynasty under Emperor Renzong and Emperor Shenzong.

Another early proposal for abolishing lingchi was submitted by Lu You (1125–1210) in a memorandum to the imperial court of the Southern Song dynasty. Lu You there stated, "When the muscles of the flesh are already taken away, the breath of life is not yet cut off, liver and heart are still connected, seeing and hearing still exist. It affects the harmony of nature, it is injurious to a benevolent government, and does not befit a generation of wise men." Lu You's elaborate argument against lingchi was dutifully copied and transmitted by generations of scholars, among them influential jurists of all dynasties, until the late Qing dynasty reformist Shen Jiaben (1840–1913) included it in his 1905 memorandum that obtained the abolition. This anti-lingchi trend coincided with a more general attitude opposed to "cruel and unusual” punishments (such as the exposure of the head) that the Tang dynasty had not included in the canonic table of the Five Punishments, which defined the legal ways of punishing crime. Hence the abolitionist trend is deeply ingrained in the Chinese legal tradition, rather than being purely derived from Western influences.

Under later emperors, lingchi was reserved for only the most heinous acts, such as treason, a charge often dubious or false, as exemplified by the deaths of Liu Jin, a Ming dynasty eunuch, and Yuan Chonghuan, a Ming dynasty general. In 1542, lingchi was inflicted on a group of palace women who had attempted to assassinate the Jiajing Emperor. The bodies of the women were then displayed in public. Reports from Qing dynasty jurists such as Shen Jiaben show that executioners' customs varied, as the regular way to perform this penalty was not specified in detail in the penal code.

Lingchi was also known in Vietnam, notably being used as the method of execution of the French missionary Joseph Marchand, in 1835, as part of the repression following the unsuccessful Lê Văn Khôi revolt. An 1858 account by Harper's Weekly claimed the martyr Auguste Chapdelaine was also killed by lingchi but in China; in reality he was beaten to death.

Lingchi became an incredibly common punishment during the Qing dynasty as the Manchu court attempted to force the country to submit through fear.

As Western countries moved to abolish similar punishments, some Westerners began to focus attention on the methods of execution used in China. As early as 1866, the time when Britain began to abolish hanging, drawing, and quartering, Thomas Francis Wade, then serving with the British diplomatic mission in China, unsuccessfully urged the abolition of lingchi. Lingchi remained in the Qing dynasty's code of laws for persons convicted of high treason and other serious crimes, but the punishment was abolished as a result of the 1905 revision of the Chinese penal code by Shen Jiaben.

=== Western perceptions ===
The Western perception of lingchi has often differed considerably from actual practice, and some misconceptions persist to the present. The distinction between the Western conception and the Chinese reality was noted by Westerners as early as 1895. That year, Australian traveller and later representative of the government of the Republic of China George Ernest Morrison—who claimed to have obtained his information from an eyewitness to such an execution—wrote that lingchi was "commonly, and quite wrongly, translated as 'death by slicing into 10,000 pieces' – a truly awful description of a punishment whose cruelty has been extraordinarily misrepresented ... The mutilation is ghastly and excites our horror as an example of barbarian cruelty; but it is not cruel, and need not excite our horror, since the mutilation is done, not before death, but after."

John Morris Roberts, in Twentieth Century: The History of the World, 1901 to 2000 (2000), writes "the traditional punishment of death by slicing ... became part of the Western image of Chinese backwardness as the 'death of a thousand cuts'." Roberts then notes that slicing "was ordered, in fact, for K'ang Yu-Wei, a man termed the 'Rousseau of China', and a major advocate of intellectual and government reform in the 1890s".

Although officially outlawed by the government of the Qing dynasty in 1905, lingchi became a widespread Western symbol of the Chinese penal system from the 1910s on, and in Zhao Erfeng's administration. Three sets of photographs shot by French soldiers in 1904–05 were the basis for later mythification. The abolition was immediately enforced, and definite: no official sentences of lingchi were performed in China after April 1905.

Regarding the use of opium, as related in the introduction to Morrison's book, Meyrick Hewlett insisted that "most Chinese people sentenced to death were given large quantities of opium before execution, and Morrison avers that a charitable person would be permitted to push opium into the mouth of someone dying in agony, thus hastening the moment of decease." At the very least, such tales were deemed credible to Western observers such as Morrison.

== People put to death by lingchi ==
=== Ming dynasty ===
- Fang Xiaoru: trusted bureaucrat of the Hanlin Academy relied upon by the Jianwen Emperor, put to death by lingchi in 1402 outside of Nanjing's Jubao Gate due to his refusal to draft an edict confirming the ascendance of the Yongle Emperor to the throne. He was forced to witness the brutal, special ten familial exterminations, where his family, friends and students were all executed, before he himself was killed.
- Cao Jixiang (曹吉祥): important eunuch serving under Emperor Yingzong of Ming, put to death by lingchi in 1461 for leading an army in rebellion.
- Sang Chong (桑沖): put to death by lingchi during the reign of the Chenghua Emperor for the rape of 182 women.
- Zheng Wang: peasant from Beijing, put to death by lingchi in 1506 for claiming that the newly enthroned Zhengde Emperor's birth mother was not Empress Zhang (Hongzhi), but Zheng Jinlian, Zheng Wang's daughter, causing massive controversy.
- Liu Jin: important eunuch serving under the Zhengde Emperor, put to death by lingchi in 1510 for arrogating power. Legend has it that the punishment was carried out across 3 days, with 3300 slices in total. It was reported that when Liu Jin returned to prison after the first day, he continued to eat white porridge. After the punishment was completed, the people of Beijing, especially those persecuted under Liu Jin and their families, haggled for pieces of his flesh for a wen, and ate them with wine, to vent their anger.
- Palace plot of Renyin year: the 16 palace maids involved, including Yang Jinying and Huang Yulian, along with Imperial Concubine Wang Ning and Consort Duan were all put to death by lingchi in 1542 for the attempted assassination of the Jiajing Emperor.
- Wang Gao (王杲): a Jianzhou Jurchen awarded a position of command in Jianzhou. He was put to death by lingchi at Beijing in 1575 due to repeated raids into Ming border territories. He is said to be Nurhaci's maternal great-grandfather or maternal grandfather.
- Zheng Man (鄭鄤): a shujishi during the reign of the Chongzhen Emperor, who was defamed by Chief Grand Secretary Wen Tiren and charged with the crimes of "causing his mother to be caned (due to fuji), and raping his younger sister and daughter-in-law". Executed by lingchi in 1636.
- Yuan Chonghuan: famous general during the reign of the Chongzhen Emperor, entrusted with defence against the Jurchens. The Emperor reportedly fell for the Jurchens' stratagem of sowing discord, and sentenced him to death by lingchi for the crime of attempting to rebel with the help of the Jurchens. It is said that the people of Beijing, not knowing of Yuan's innocence, fought to eat pieces of his flesh.

=== Qing dynasty ===
- Geng Jingzhong: one of the rulers of the Three Feudatories during the reign of the Kangxi Emperor. He was put to death by lingchi after their revolt failed.
- He Luohui (何洛會) and Hu Ci (胡錫): put to death by lingchi due to their earlier defamation of Hooge, Prince Su.
- Zhu Yigui: duck farmer in Taiwan during the reign of the Kangxi Emperor. Unhappy with the local governor's indulgence of his son's excesses, he revolted to re-establish the Ming dynasty by claiming to be a descendant of the Hongwu Emperor. After the revolt failed, he was transported to Beijing and put to death by lingchi.
- On 1 November 1728, after the Qing reconquest of Lhasa in Tibet, several Tibetan rebels were sliced to death by Qing Manchu officers and officials in front of the Potala Palace. Qing Manchu President of the Board of Civil Office, Jalangga, Mongol sub-chancellor Sen-ge and brigadier-general Manchu Mala ordered Tibetan rebels Lum-pa-nas and Na-p'od-pa to be sliced. Tibetan rNam-rgyal-grva-ts'an college administrator (gner-adsin) and sKyor'lun Lama were tied together with Lum-pa-nas and Na-p'od-pa on four scaffolds (k'rims-sin) to be sliced. The Manchus used musket matchlocks to fire three salvoes and then the Manchus strangled the two lamas while slicing Lum-pa-nas and Na-p'od-pa to death. The Tibetan population was depressed by the scene and the writer of MBTJ continued to feel sad as he described it 5 years later. The public execution spectacle worked on the Tibetans since they were "cowed into submission" by the Qing. Even the Tibetan collaborator with the Qing, Polhané Sönam Topgyé (P'o-lha-nas), felt sad at his fellow Tibetans being executed in this manner and prayed for them. All of this was included in a report sent to the Qing Yongzheng Emperor.
- On 23 January 1751 (25/XII), Tibetan rebels who participated in the Lhasa riot of 1750 against the Qing were sliced to death by Qing Manchu general Bandi, similar to what happened on 1 November 1728. 6 Tibetan rebel leaders plus Tibetan rebel leader Blo-bzan-bkra-sis were sliced to death. Manchu General Bandi sent a report to the Qing Qianlong emperor on 26 January 1751 on how he carried out the slicing of the Tibetan rebels: dBan-rgyas (Wang-chieh), Padma-sku-rje-c'os-a['el (Pa-t'e-ma-ku-erh-chi-ch'un-p'i-lo) and Tarqan Yasor (Ta-erh-han Ya-hsün) were sliced to death for injuring the Manchu ambans with arrows, bows and fowling pieces during the Lhasa riot when they assaulted the building the Manchu ambans (Labdon and Fucin) were in; Sacan Hasiha (Ch'e-ch'en-ha-shih-ha) for murder of multiple individuals; Ch'ui-mu-cha-t'e and Rab-brtan (A-la-pu-tan) for looting money and setting fire during the attack on the Ambans; Blo-bzan-bkra-sis, the mgron-gner for being the overall leader of the rebels who led the attack which looted money and killed the Manchu ambans.
- Eledeng'e (額爾登額) or possibly 額爾景額): The Qianlong emperor ordered Manchu general Eledeng'e (also spelled E'erdeng'e 額爾登額) to be sliced to death after his commander Mingrui was defeated at the Battle of Maymyo in the Sino-Burmese War in 1768 because Eledeng'i was not able to help flank Mingrui when he did not arrive at a rendezvous.
- Wang Nangxian (w:zh:王囊仙), the female leader of the anti-Manchu White Lotus Rebellion in January 1797 during the Qing Dynasty. She was captured around August of 1797, during a skirmish at a Bouyei stronghold located in Dongsa, where Qing army used superior tactics to crush the rebellion's initial victory. She was considered a highly important prisoner, locked in a prison car, with governors required to document each time she enters or leaves a province. She was tried and sentenced to Lingchi in December of 1797, with her execution taking place in 1798. Following her execution, citizens of the Nanlong Prefecture (Renamed to Xingyi Prefecture) expressed their sorrow and set up incense tables in their homes for memorial ceremonies honoring her
- Chen De (陳德): a retrenched chef during the reign of the Jiaqing Emperor. Put to death by lingchi in 1803 for a failed assassination of the emperor outside the Forbidden City.
- Zhang Liangbi (張良璧): a child sexual abuser during the reign of the Jiaqing Emperor. He was 70 years old when caught. He was put to death by lingchi in 1811 for raping 16 underage girls, resulting in the deaths of 11 of them.
- Pan Zhaoxiang (潘兆祥): poisoned his father. Put to death by lingchi on 24 June in the fifth year of the reign of the Daoguang Emperor (1825).
- Jahangir Khoja: a Uyghur Muslim Sayyid and Naqshbandi Sufi rebel of the Afaqi suborder, Jahangir Khoja was sliced to death in 1828 by the Manchus for leading a rebellion against the Qing.
- Li Shangfa (李尚發): slashed his mother to death in a fit of hysteria. Put to death by lingchi in May of the 25th year of the reign of the Daoguang Emperor (1845). Three bystanders were sentenced to 100 strokes of the cane each for not moving to stop him.
- Shi Dakai: the most decorated general of the Taiping Heavenly Kingdom, proclaimed as the Wing King. He was trapped during a crossing of the Dadu River due to a sudden flood, and surrendered to Qing forces to save his army. He was put to death by lingchi together with his immediate subordinates. He chided his subordinates for crying in pain during their ordeal, and he himself said not a word during his turn.
- Hong Tianguifu: son of the Heavenly King Hong Xiuquan of the Taiping Heavenly Kingdom. He was captured by famous general Shen Baozhen and put to death by lingchi. He was possibly the youngest to ever have been subjected to lingchi, at 14 years old.
- Lin Fengxiang: general of the Taiping Heavenly Kingdom. Put to death by lingchi in March 1855 at the Beijing Caishikou Execution Grounds. Reportedly, the process was recorded.
- Kumud Pazik (古穆·巴力克): a chief of the Sakizaya people in Hualien County, Taiwan. He allied with the Kavalan people in armed rebellion against the Qing's expansionist policies against the Taiwanese indigenous peoples (a result of the Japanese invasion of Taiwan in 1874). He was publicly put to death by lingchi on 9 September 1878 as a warning to the various villages in the aftermath of the Karewan Incident.
- Kang Xiaoba (康小八): a bandit who robbed and killed countless innocents, armed with a gun stolen from Westerners. He caused disturbances in Beijing, managing to scare Empress Dowager Cixi, before he was caught and put to death by lingchi.
- Wang Weiqin (王維勤): an influential landowner in his village in Shandong who masterminded the killings of a rival family of twelve. He was put to death by lingchi in October 1904. He rode a chariot to the execution grounds, so he was suspected to have much influence. French soldiers took photos of the execution, and it is believed that this is the first time photographs of lingchi spread overseas.
- Fu Zhuli (富珠哩): a Mongol prince's slave, who reportedly rebelled against said prince because the prince tried to force himself upon Fu Zhuli's wife. He was put to death by lingchi on 10 April 1905. Lingchi was abolished as a punishment two weeks later, due to pressure by Westerners, in part because French soldiers took clear photos of Fu Zhuli's execution.
- Xu Xilin: a member of the Guangfuhui; put to death by lingchi on 6 July 1907.

=== Republican era ===
- Ling Fushun (凌福順): soldier of the Chinese Communist Party, who was caught at Puyuanzhen in Zhouning County after returning from soliciting donations in Jian'ou. He was put to death by lingchi by Republican forces on 25 April 1936.

== Published accounts ==
- Thomas Taylor Meadows, The Chinese and Their Rebellions, Viewed in Connection with Their National Philosophy, Ethics, Legislation, and Administration (1851). Meadows—a sinologist and member of the British diplomatic corps—visited an execution-ground in Canton whereat a captured bandit was to be executed by lingchi; the members of Meadows' party were able to observe "[...] the two cuts across the forehead, the cutting off of the left breast, and slicing of the flesh from the front of the thighs," though they "could not see all the horrible operation." Meadows ends with an estimation that from "the first stroke of the knife till the moment the body was cut down from the cross and decapitated, about four or five minutes [had] elapsed."
- Sir Henry Norman, The People and Politics of the Far East (1895). Norman was a Liberal British Parliamentarian and government minister whose collection is now owned by the University of Cambridge. Norman gives an eyewitness account of various physical punishments and tortures inflicted in a magistrate's court (yamen) and of the execution by beheading of 15 men. He gives the following graphic account of a lingchi execution but does not claim to have witnessed such an execution himself. "[The executioner] grasping handfuls from the fleshy parts of the body such as the thighs and breasts slices them away ... the limbs are cut off piecemeal at the wrists and ankles, the elbows and knees, shoulders and hips. Finally the condemned is stabbed to the heart and the head is cut off."
- George Ernest Morrison, An Australian in China (1895), differs from some other reports in stating that most lingchi mutilations are in fact made postmortem. Morrison wrote his description based on an account related by a claimed eyewitness: "The prisoner is tied to a rude cross: he is invariably deeply under the influence of opium. The executioner, standing before him, with a sharp sword makes two quick incisions above the eyebrows, and draws down the portion of skin over each eye, then he makes two more quick incisions across the breast, and in the next moment he pierces the heart, and death is instantaneous. Then he cuts the body in pieces; and the degradation consists in the fragmentary shape in which the prisoner has to appear in heaven."
- The Times (9 December 1927); a journalist reported from Canton that the Communists were targeting Christian priests, and that: "It was announced that Father Wong was to be publicly executed by the slicing process."
- George de Roerich, Trails to Inmost Asia (1931), p . 119, relates the story of the assassination of Yang Tseng-hsin, Governor of Sinkiang in July 1928, by the bodyguard of his foreign minister Fan Yao-han. Fan was seized, and he and his daughter were both executed by lingchi, the minister forced to watch his daughter's execution first. Roerich was not an eyewitness to this event, having already returned to India by the date of the execution.
- George Ryley Scott, in History of Torture (1940), claims that many were executed this way by the Chinese Communist insurgents; he cites claims made by the Nanking government in 1927. It is likely that these claims were anti-communist propaganda. Scott also uses the term "the slicing process" and differentiates between the different types of execution in different parts of the country. There is no mention of opium. Riley's book contains a picture of a sliced corpse (with no mark to the heart) that was killed in Guangzhou (Canton) in 1927. It gives no indication of whether the slicing was done post-mortem. Scott claims it was common for the relatives of the condemned to bribe the executioner to kill the condemned before the slicing procedure began.

=== Photographs ===
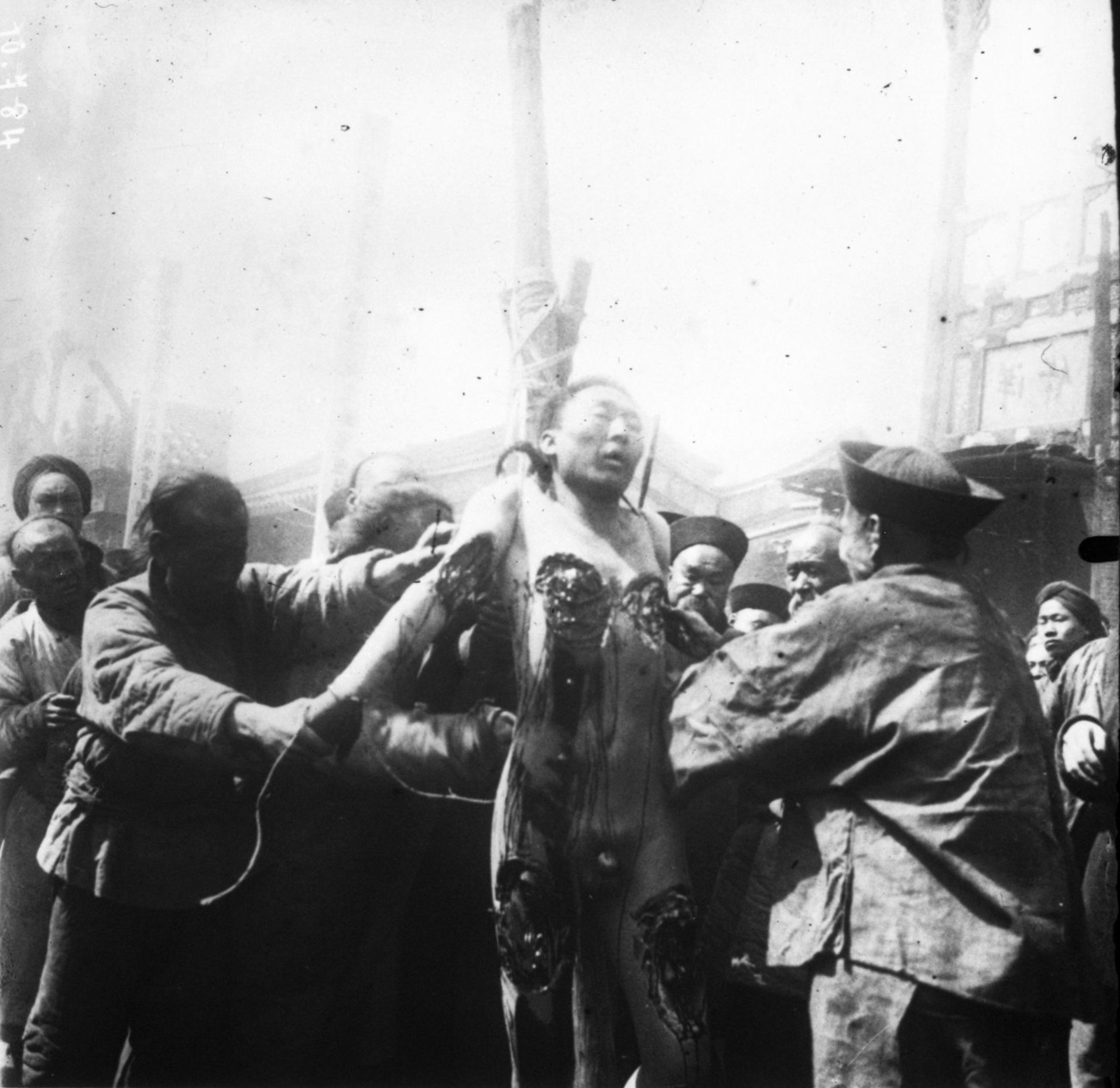
Lingchi execution in Beijing c. April 1905, apparently of Fou-Tchou-Li

The first Western photographs of lingchi were taken in Canton in 1890 by William Arthur Curtis of Kentucky.

French soldiers stationed in Beijing had the opportunity to photograph three different lingchi executions in 1904 and 1905:

- Wang Weiqin (王維勤), a former official who killed two families, executed on 31 October 1904.
- Unknown, reason unknown, possibly a young deranged boy who killed his mother, and was executed in January 1905. Photographs were published in various volumes of Georges Dumas' Nouveau traité de psychologie, 8 vols., Paris, 1930–1943, and again nominally by Bataille (in fact by Lo Duca), who mistakenly appended abstracts of Fou-tchou-li's executions as related by Carpeaux (see below).
- Fou-tchou-li or Fuzhuli (符珠哩), a Mongol guard who killed his master, the Prince of the Aohan Banner of Inner Mongolia, and who was executed on 10 April 1905; as lingchi was to be abolished two weeks later, this was presumably the last attested case of lingchi in Chinese history, or said Kang Xiaoba (康小八). Photographs appeared in books by Matignon (1910), and Carpeaux (1913), the latter claiming (falsely) that he was present. Carpeaux's narrative was mistakenly, but persistently, associated with photographs published by Dumas and Bataille. Even related to the correct set of photos, Carpeaux's narrative is highly dubious; for instance, an examination of the Chinese judicial archives shows that Carpeaux bluntly invented the execution decree. The proclamation is reported to state: "The Mongolian princes demand that the aforesaid Fou-Tchou-Le, guilty of the murder of Prince Ao-Han-Ouan, be burned alive, but the Emperor finds this torture too cruel and condemns Fou-Tchou-Li to slow death by leng-tch-e (different spelling of lingchi, cutting into pieces)."

== Popular culture ==
Accounts of lingchi or the extant photographs have inspired or referenced in numerous artistic, literary, and cinematic media:

=== Nonfiction ===
Susan Sontag mentions the 1905 case in Regarding the Pain of Others (2003). One reviewer wrote that though Sontag includes no photographs in her book—a volume about photography—"she does tantalisingly describe a photograph that obsessed the philosopher Georges Bataille, in which a Chinese criminal, while being chopped up and slowly flayed by executioners, rolls his eyes heavenwards in transcendent bliss." Bataille wrote about lingchi in L'expérience intérieure (1943) and in Le coupable (1944). He included five pictures in his The Tears of Eros (1961; translated into English and published by City Lights in 1989).

=== Music ===
Naked City's album Leng Tch'e is about this form of torture. The tenth song on Taylor Swift's seventh album, Lover, is entitled "Death by a Thousand Cuts" and compares the singer's heartbreak to this punishment.

=== Literature ===
The "death by a thousand cuts" with reference to China is mentioned in Amy Tan's novel The Joy Luck Club, and Robert van Gulik's Judge Dee novels. The 1905 photos are mentioned in Thomas Harris' novel Hannibal, in Julio Cortázar's novel Hopscotch and are also a central topic in Salvador Elizondo's Farabeuf, where the procedure is carried out by the protagonist. Agustina Bazterrica mentioned the torture in her book Tender is the Flesh, as the method used by the sister of the protagonist to make the meat served at the memorial party fresh and tasty. The Chinese idiom "千刀萬剮" qiāndāo wànguǎ is also a reference to linchi.

=== Film ===
A scene of Lingchi appeared in the 1966 film The Sand Pebbles. Inspired by the 1905 photos, Chinese artist Chen Chieh-jen created a 25-minute, 2002 video called Lingchi – Echoes of a Historical Photograph, which has generated some controversy. The 2007 film The Warlords, which is loosely based on historical events during the Taiping Rebellion, ended with one of its main characters executed by Lingchi.

== See also ==
- Death by a Thousand Cuts – a 2008 book that examines the practice of lingchi
- Combing (torture)
- Flaying
- Hanged, drawn and quartered – an English method of torturous execution
- Lethal injection
- Scaphism – an alleged ancient Persian method of torturous execution
- Sinophobia
- Tameshigiri – in Japan, cuts for testing swords, sometimes used on people
- Waist chop – a form of execution in China, also noted for causing a lingering death
- Yellow Peril
