= Palace plot of Renyin year =

1544 Chinese imperial assassination plot

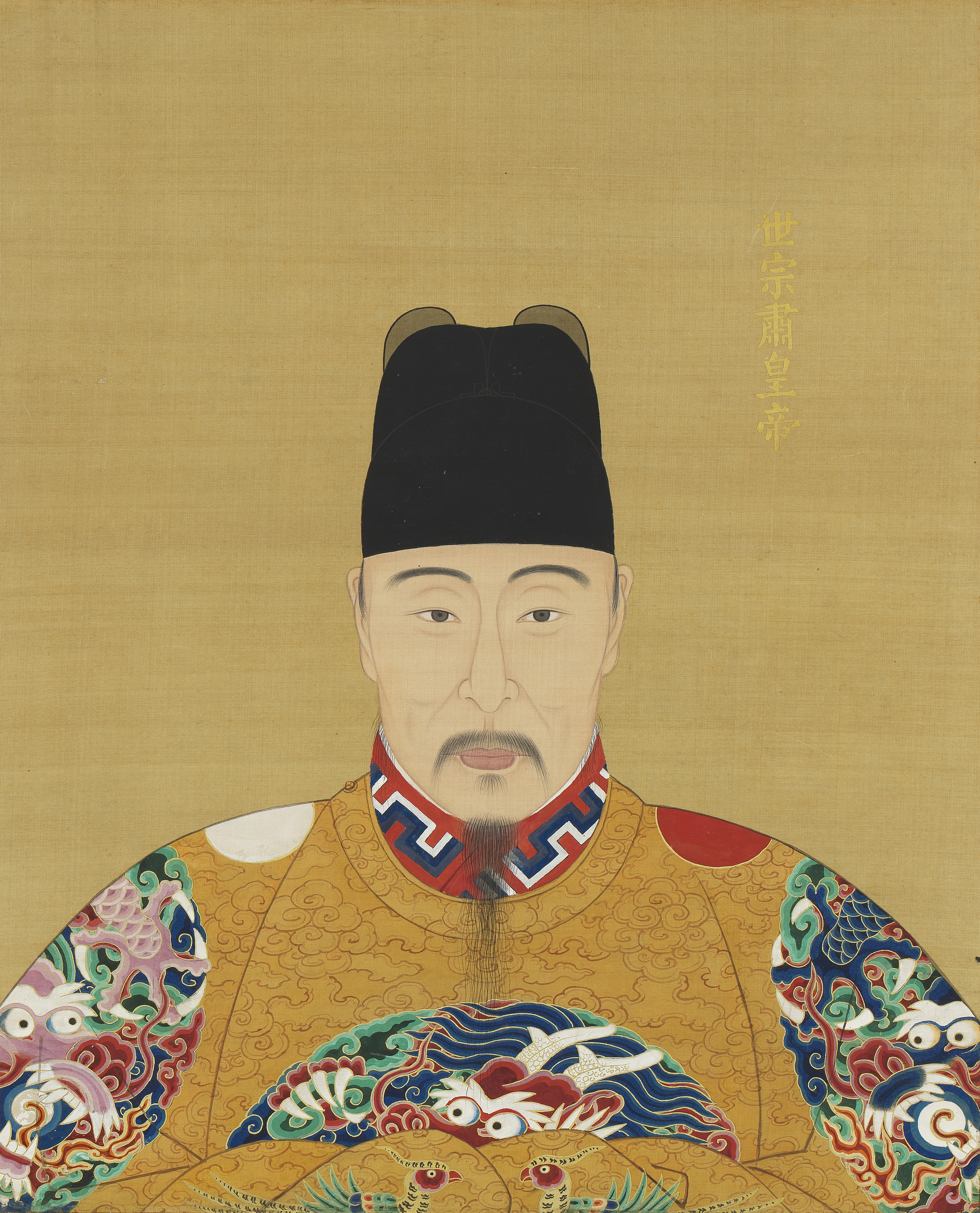
- Portrait of the Jiajing Emperor, kept in the National Palace Museum, Taipei
- Location: Forbidden City
- Date: 27 November 1542
- Target: Jiajing Emperor
- Attack type: Political assassination; regicide; hanging
- Deaths: 17
- Injuries: 1

The Palace plot of Renyin year (simplified Chinese: 壬寅宫变; traditional Chinese: 壬寅宮變), also known as the Palace Women's Uprising (宮女起義), was a Ming dynasty plot against the Jiajing Emperor, where sixteen palace women attempted to murder him. It occurred in 1542, the 21st year of the reign of the Jiajing Emperor and the renyin year of the sexagenary cycle, hence its name.

== Causes ==
The Jiajing Emperor has been called the "Taoist emperor", due to his adherence to Taoist beliefs, particularly divination and alchemy. One of the alchemical concoctions he took to prolong his life, at the urging of a Taoist priest in his court, was a substance made from the menstrual blood of virgins called "red lead" (紅鉛). Girls aged 13–14 were kept for this purpose, and were fed only mulberry leaves and rainwater. Any girls who developed illnesses were expelled. It has been suggested that this maltreatment led to the uprising. "Hiding in the inner chambers, they harbored resentment from the shadows of the imperial harem", wrote the late Ming historian Tan Qian.

Another version of the story is that the Jiajing Emperor's garden had many banana trees, and the morning dew collected from the leaves tasted sweet and refreshing. The Jiajing Emperor thus drank the water, believing it would promote longevity. Young girls in the palace were made to collect the dew every morning, and many of them fell ill due to the cold.

Sometimes older women were sent to collect the dew as a form of punishment. One time, the Emperor was given a "longevity turtle" dyed in five different colors, and he ordered his lower-ranking concubines to care for the animal. However, the turtle died, and the furious Emperor ordered the concubines to collect the morning dew. Around the same time, Concubine Ning was spreading rumors that the emperor had lost the mandate of Heaven because he had been enchanted by Consort Duan. The rumor alleged that Consort Duan was actually a fox spirit and her spell on the Emperor offended Heaven. When the Emperor found out, he ordered Concubine Ning to collect the dew as punishment. When in the garden, Concubine Ning met other concubines who had been similarly punished, and they hatched a plan. If the Emperor were found dead in Consort Duan's quarters, the incident of the dead turtle would be forgotten and Concubine Ning would be vindicated for saying that the Emperor had lost Heaven's favor due to Consort Duan.

== Events ==
In 1542, the Emperor was staying in Consort Duan's quarters. A group of palace women who were pretending to wait on him tied a hemp rope around his neck and attempted to strangle him. The rope was mis-tied, failing to kill the Emperor and instead only causing him to faint from fright. Realizing that the plot had failed, Zhang Jinlian became frightened and went to alert Empress Fang. The Empress hurried over, and the eunuchs revived the Emperor. The palace women were all arrested.

=== Participants ===
The role of each individual in the attempt on the emperor's life was judged and recorded as below:

- Concubine Ning, of the Wang clan (宁嫔 王氏), head of the plot
- Consort Duan, the assault happened in her quarters
- Chen Juhua (陈菊花), personally involved in strangling the Emperor
- Deng Jinxiang (邓金香), conspired to murder the Emperor
- Guan Meixiu (关梅秀), personally involved in strangling the Emperor
- Huang Yulian (黄玉莲), conspired to murder the Emperor
- Liu Miaolian (刘妙莲), personally involved in strangling the Emperor
- Su Chuanyao (苏川药), personally involved in strangling the Emperor
- Wang Xiulan (王秀兰), personally involved in strangling the Emperor
- Xing Cuilian (邢翠莲), personally involved in strangling the Emperor
- Xu Qiuhua (徐秋花), conspired to murder the Emperor
- Yang Cuiying (杨翠英), personally involved in strangling the Emperor
- Yang Jinying (杨金英), personally involved in strangling the Emperor
- Yang Yuxiang (杨玉香), personally involved in strangling the Emperor
- Yao Shucui (姚淑翠), personally involved in strangling the Emperor
- Zhang Chunjing (张春景), conspired to murder the Emperor
- Zhang Jinlian (张金莲), reported the plot to Empress Fang

== Aftermath ==
After the attack, the Jiajing Emperor was unconscious for several days, so Empress Fang set the punishment for the palace women. She ordered all of them, including Zhang Jinlian, who had informed her of the attack, to public death by slow slicing. Although Consort Duan had not been present, the Empress decided that she had been involved with the plot and sentenced her to death too. The bodies of the palace women, Concubine Ning, and Consort Duan were then displayed on hooks. Ten members of the women's families were also beheaded, while a further twenty were enslaved and gifted to ministers, with their properties seized and given to the families of officials loyal to the Emperor.

== Consequences ==
Although the Jiajing Emperor had been incapacitated at the time, he resented Empress Fang for having killed his favorite Consort Duan. He later determined Consort Duan had been innocent and suspected the Empress of using the situation to rid herself of a hated rival. In 1547, when a fire destroyed parts of the palace, the Emperor refused to have Empress Fang rescued, and she burned to death. The Emperor claimed that this was the will of Heaven.

After the uprising, the Jiajing Emperor did not stop creating red lead. Instead, he ordered restrictions on girls entering the palace to be tightened. In 1547, 300 girls between the ages of 11 and 14 were selected as new palace women. In 1552, a further 200 girls were selected to serve in the palace, but the minimum age limit was reduced to eight years old. Three years later, in 1555, 150 girls below the age of eight were taken into the palace to be used for making the Emperor's medicine.
