= Combing (torture) =

Form of torture using iron combs

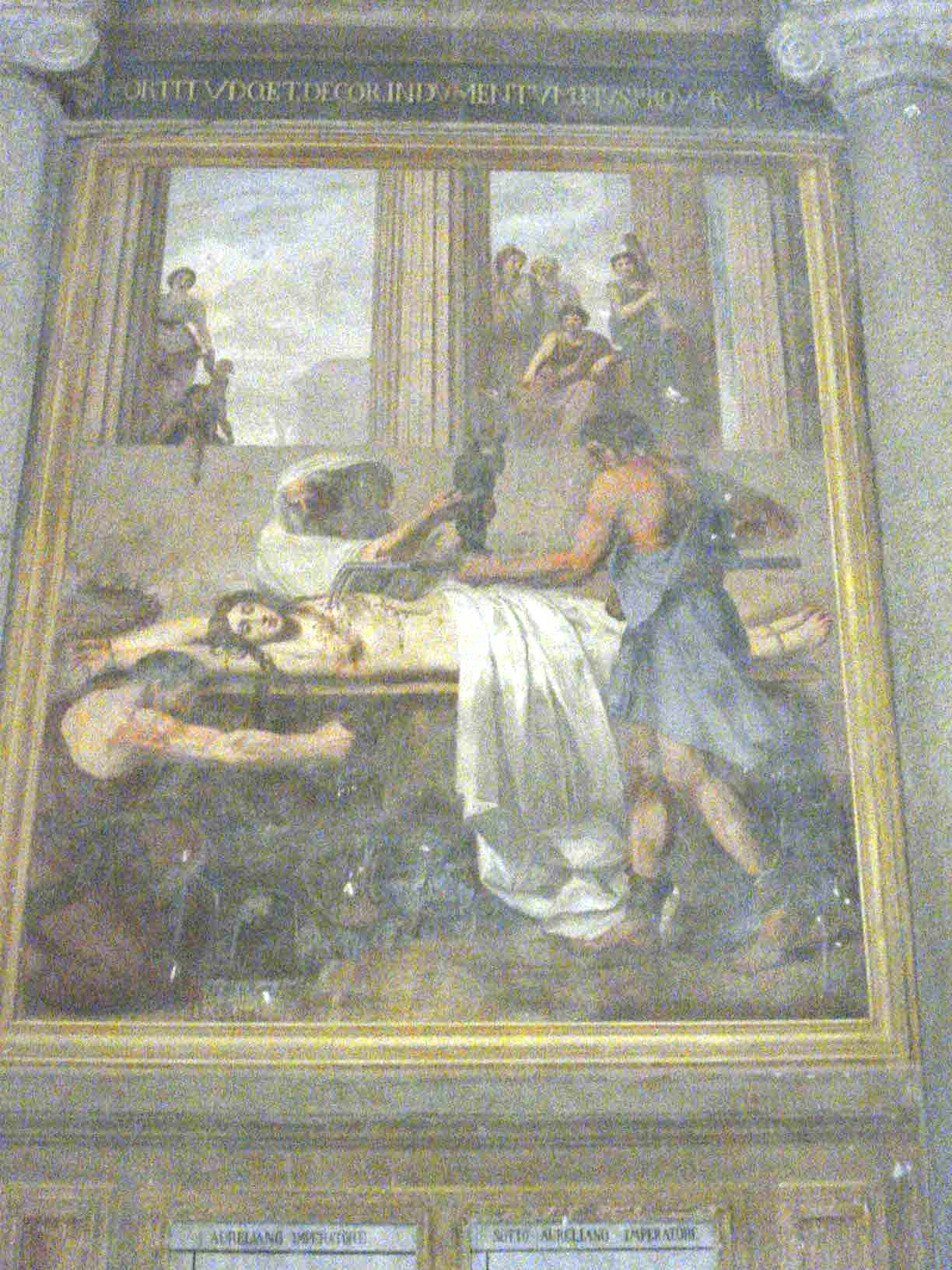
A painting depicting the torture of Saint Margaret with iron hooks

Combing, sometimes known as carding (not to be confused with fibre carding), is a sometimes-fatal form of torture in which iron combs designed to prepare wool and other fibres for woolen spinning are used to scrape, tear, and flay the victim's flesh.

== History ==
The tradition that a torturous death by combing with a knaphos was inflicted by Croesus was recorded by Herodotus. Later mentions from the Middle East and Asia Minor often associate combing with heroic martyrdom for the sake of belief in the Abrahamic God and loyalty to one's Jewish, Christian, or Muslim faith. Specific episodes of combing are mentioned in the Talmud.

== Notable victims ==
In the 6th century BC, when Croesus's half-brother Pantaleon failed to seize and hold the throne of the Lydian Empire, one of his supporters was captured. According to the description given by Herodotus, Croesus tortured the life out of his captive by having him "hauled over a comb".

As described in the Mishnah, Rabbi Akiva, a Jewish sage of the latter part of the 1st century and the beginning of the 2nd century, said the Shema prayer as he was combed to death by agents of Ancient Rome.

Combing continued to be used as a means of torture during the persecution of early Christians in the Roman Empire. The Acts of St. Blaise, a Greek text describing the 3rd-century Armenian bishop Saint Blaise, recount how he was captured by the governor of Cappadocia and beaten, combed, and beheaded for not renouncing Christianity. Eventually becoming a popular saint in Medieval Europe and venerated as one of the Fourteen Holy Helpers, he became the patron saint of wool combers and even the general wool trade, due to the iron combs throughout his iconography.

St. Antonius of Beba, a martyr venerated in the Coptic Orthodox Church, was also tortured with iron combs before being beheaded. St. Hilaria, another Coptic martyr, survived torture by combing and other sadistic methods before finally being dismembered, beheaded, and thrown into a fire. A third Coptic martyr, the ascetic virgin St. Febronia, in the reign of Emperor Diocletian lived through combing, being crushed by a wheel, and other tortures, before she too was beheaded.

== See also ==
- Lingchi
