= Empress Fang =

Empress of China from 1534 to 1547

Empress Xiaolie 孝烈皇后

Empress consort of the Ming dynasty
- Tenure: 1534–1547
- Predecessor: Empress Zhang
- Successor: Empress Xiao'an
- Born: 1516
- Died: 1547 (aged 30–31); Beijing
- Burial: Yong Mausoleum
- Spouse: Jiajing Emperor (m. 1530)
- Clan: Fang (方)
- Father: Fang Tai (方泰)

Empress Xiaolie (1516–1547), of the Fang clan, was a Chinese empress consort of the Ming dynasty, third empress to the Jiajing Emperor.

== Early life ==
Fang originated from the area of Nanjing. She was selected for palace service in 1531, and chosen as a concubine for the emperor.

She was described as beautiful and talented. However, she refused to use bribes to improve her chances of being selected to share the bed of the emperor, and as the emperor did not wish to have sexual intercourse with women over the age of fifteen, her chance to experience a sexual encounter with the emperor was therefore past, which reportedly caused her great sorrow and emotional loss.

== Empress ==
In 28 January 1534, nine days after the deposition of Empress Zhang, Fang was nevertheless chosen by the emperor to succeed as empress consort of the imperial court. She was forced to make the decision because she sided with him during his dispute with his officials over the rituals honoring the imperial ancestors.

=== Renyin palace rebellion ===
Empress Fang was described as the favorite spouse of the emperor, and saved the emperor's life during the Renyin palace rebellion. Emperor Jiajing, who was described as strict and liable to violent outbursts, was known for his cruelty toward his female staff and palace women, reportedly having had 200 women of the palace staff beaten to death during his reign. In October 1542, sixteen palace maids formed a conspiracy to assassinate the emperor; not for political reasons, but as retaliation for his abuse. One night when the emperor was in bed with his favorite concubine, Consort Duan, the sixteen maids attacked him in his bed and tried to strangle him. They stuffed his mouth, jabbed at his penis, tied a silk cord around his neck and pulled until he lost consciousness. At this moment, however, one of them, Zhang Jinlian (張金蓮), lost her nerve and left to alert the empress. Empress Fang rushed in, untied the knot and saved the emperor's life.

The emperor could not speak after the attack and was in a state of shock. Therefore, the empress acted on his behalf and had all the sixteen conspirators executed, as well as Consort Duan. When the emperor recovered, he could not believe that Duan had been involved as Duan had been his favorite. Although he was grateful to her for saving his life, and granted her official honors for this, he blamed her for Duan's death, and their personal relationship was permanently damaged. Fang was said to have become depressed as a result.

=== Death ===
Empress Fang died in a fire in 1547. When a eunuch asked the emperor if the trapped empress should be saved, the emperor refused to answer, and she therefore burned to death. He did nevertheless grant her all honors after her death.

== Titles ==
- During the reign of the Zhengde Emperor (r. 1505–1521):
  - Lady Fang (方氏)
- During the reign of the Jiajing Emperor (r. 1521–1567)
  - Concubine De (德嫔 from 1531)
  - Empress (皇后; from 1534)
  - Empress Xiaolie (孝烈皇后; from 1547)
  - Jiutian Jinque Yutang Fusheng Tianhou Zhangxian Miaohua Yuanjun (九天金闕玉堂輔聖天后掌仙妙化元君; from 1556)
- During the reign of the Longqing Emperor (r. 1567–1572)
  - Empress Xiaolie Duanshun Minhui Gongcheng Zhitian Weisheng (孝烈端順敏惠恭誠祗天衛聖皇后; from 1567)

== Notes ==
Chinese royalty
Preceded by Empress Zhang	Empress consort of China; 1534–1547	Succeeded by Empress Xiao'an
