= Empress Xia (Ming dynasty) =

Empress of China from 1506 to 1521

Empress Xiaojingyi 孝靜毅皇后
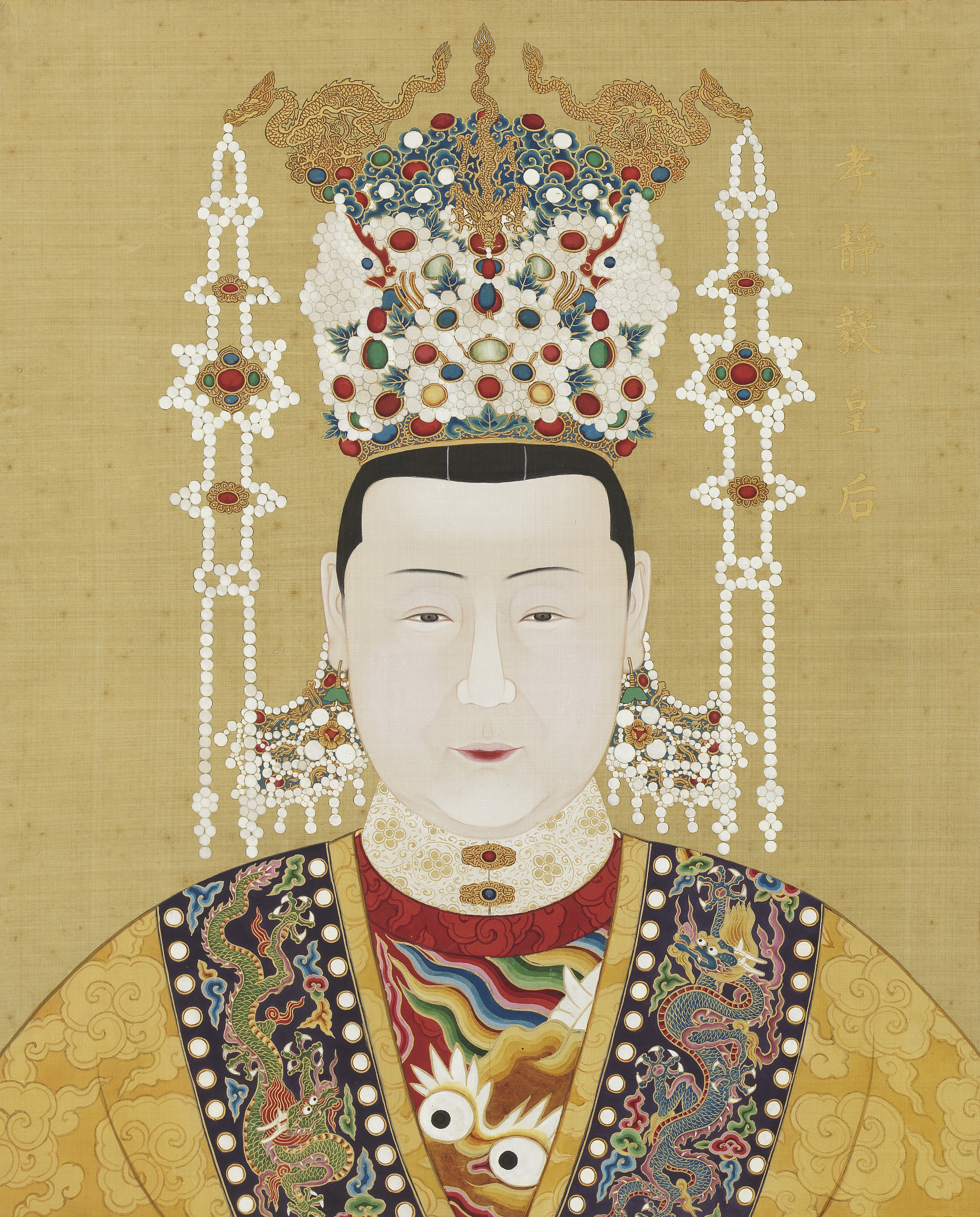

Empress consort of the Ming dynasty
- Tenure: 1506 – 20 April 1521
- Predecessor: Empress Xiaochengjing
- Successor: Empress Xiaojiesu
- Born: 1492
- Died: 26 February 1535 (age 42–43)
- Spouse: Zhengde Emperor (m. 1506; died 1521)
Posthumous name
- Empress Xiaojing Zhuanghui Ansu Wencheng Shuntian Xiesheng Yi (孝靜莊惠安肅溫誠順天偕聖毅皇后)
- Clan: Xia (夏)
- Father: Xia Ru, Count of Qingyang (慶陽伯 夏儒)
- Mother: Lady Ye (叶氏)

Empress Xiaojingyi (1492 – 26 February 1535), of the Xia clan, was a Chinese empress consort of the Ming dynasty, married to the Zhengde Emperor.

== Biography ==
Lady Xia was the daughter of Xia Ru (夏儒), a count. Her origins trace back to the district Shangyuan (in present Nanjing). In 1506, she was selected to become the first consort and empress of the emperor. She was praised for her virtue and elegance during her time as Empress consort however she remained childless. After 14 years of marriage, the Emperor died and was succeeded by his cousin the Jiajing Emperor. She could not receive the title of Empress Dowager as her mother in law, Empress Zhang was still living and was hence honoured with the title Empress Zhuangsu

Empress Zhuangsu died 14 years later from an unknown illness

== Titles ==
- During the reign of the Hongzhi Emperor (r. 1487–1505)
  - Lady Xia (夏氏; from 1492)
- During the reign of the Zhengde Emperor (r. 1505–1521)
  - Empress (皇后; from 1506)
- During the reign of the Jiajing Emperor (r. 1521–1567)
  - Empress Zhuangsu (莊肅皇后; from 27 May 1521)
  - Empress Xiaojing Zhuanghui Ansu Yi (孝靜莊惠安肅毅皇后; from 1535)
  - Empress Xiaojing Zhuanghui Ansu Wencheng Shuntian Xiesheng Yi (孝靜莊惠安肅溫誠順天偕聖毅皇后; from 1536)

== Notes ==
Chinese royalty
Preceded by Empress Xiaochengjing	Empress consort of China; 1506–1521	Succeeded by Empress Xiaojiesu
