= Empress Zhang (Hongzhi) =

Empress of China from 1487 to 1505

Empress Xiaochengjing 孝成敬皇后
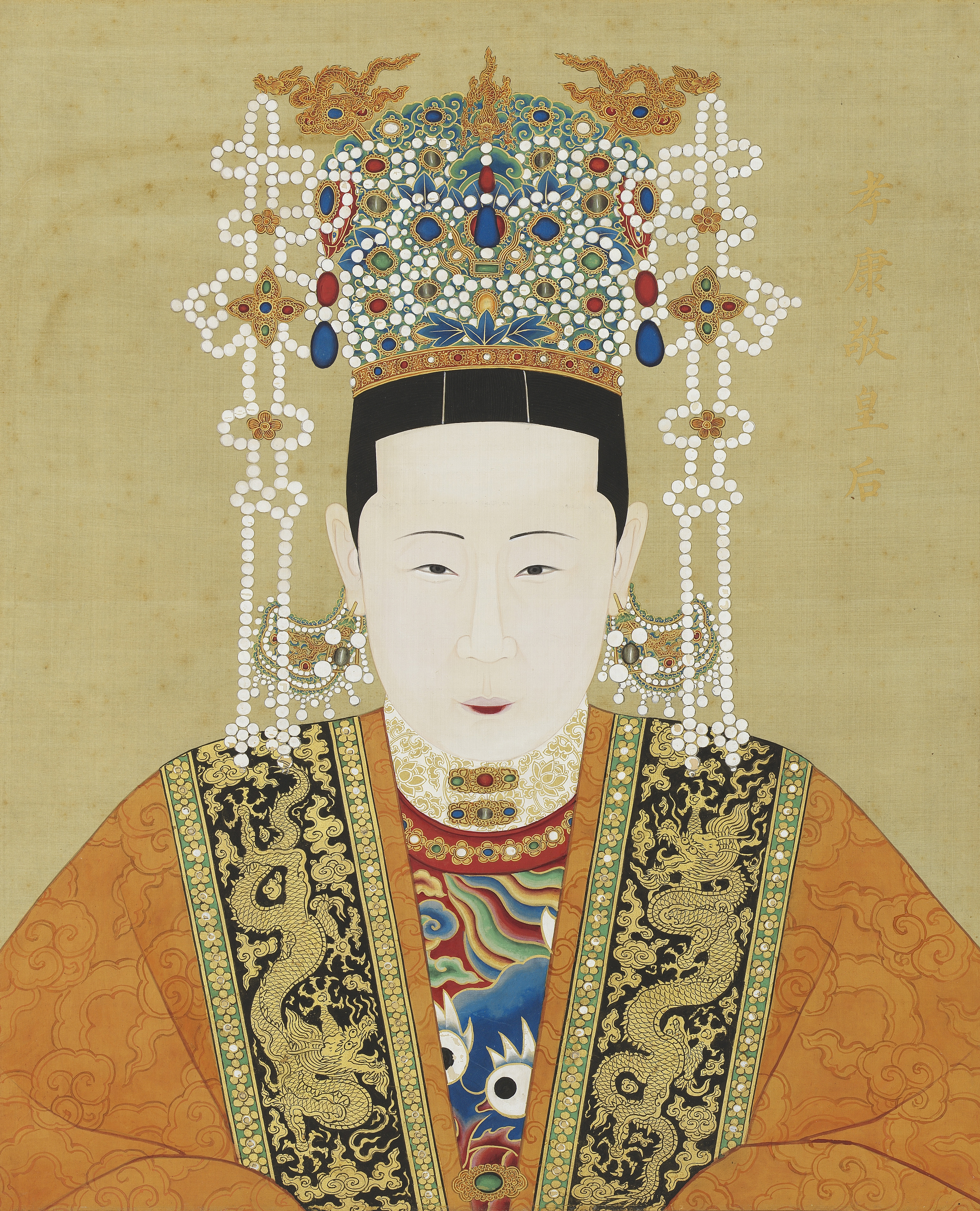

Empress dowager of the Ming dynasty
- Tenure: 19 June 1505 – 28 August 1541
- Predecessor: Empress Dowager Wang
- Successor: Empress Dowager Rensheng; Empress Dowager Cisheng

Empress consort of the Ming dynasty
- Tenure: 22 September 1487 – 8 June 1505
- Predecessor: Empress Xiaozhenchun
- Successor: Empress Xiaojingyi
- Born: 1471; Xingji County, Zhili (present-day Cang County, Hebei, China)
- Died: 28 August 1541 (aged 69–70)
- Burial: Tai Mausoleum
- Spouse: Hongzhi Emperor (m. 1487; died 1505)
- Issue Detail: Zhengde Emperor
Posthumous name
- Empress Xiàochéng Jìngsù Zhuāngcí Zhéyí Yìtiān Zànshèng Jìng (孝成靖肅莊慈哲懿翊天贊聖敬皇后)
- Clan: Zhang (張)
- Father: Zhang Luan, Duke of Chang (昌國公 張巒)
- Mother: Lady Jin (金氏)

Empress Xiaochengjing (1471– 28 August 1541), of the Zhang clan, was a Chinese empress consort of the Ming dynasty, married to the Hongzhi Emperor and mother of the Zhengde Emperor.

== Empress ==
Empress Zhang was the daughter of Zhang Luan (張巒). She was born in Xingji (nowadays Cang county, Hebei province). In 1487, she married then-Crown Prince Youcheng and was thus given the title of crown princess. She was created empress when her husband succeeded the throne later that year. She remains the only empress to an adult emperor who had no concubines in Chinese history. The emperor did not want other wives or concubines because he is said to have loved her sincerely.

Empress Zhang was described as a "foolish and demanding woman, capable of no more than petty faults", but those included a constant desire for expensive objects, credulity about the teachings of the most specious Buddhist and Taoïst clerics, and limitless favour for her family, especially her two unrestrainedly venal brothers. This pair, Zhang Heling (張鶴齡) and Zhang Yanling (張延齡), with the support of their sister the Empress and her mother, Lady Jin, made careers of misusing their high position.

In 1505, the Hongzhi Emperor died and her son ascended the throne as the Zhengde Emperor. Being his mother she was created empress dowager. In 1510 she was bestowed the title of Cishou (慈寿皇太后).

== Later Life ==
In 1521, the childless Zhengde Emperor died and his cousin, Zhu Houcong, ascended the throne as the Jiajing Emperor. It was thought that he would continue the line of succession in the role of the deceased emperor's adoptive younger brother and treat his aunt, Empress Dowager Zhang, and deceased uncle as father and mother. A crisis developed when Jiajing's mother, Lady Jiang, arrived at Tongzhou. She heard that she was to be received as a princess rather than as an empress and that her son was pressured to refer her as his aunt. She threatened to return to Anlu with her son, who informed Empress Dowager Zhang he intended to abdicate. An edict was issued under Empress Dowager Zhang's seal giving her an imperial title.

Empress Dowager Zhang, however, continued to regard Lady Jiang as an unimportant princess, receiving her with the courtesies proper for an imperial princess, her title of empress dowager notwithstanding. Her behaviour infuriated the emperor no less than it did his mother; henceforth, he used every means at his disposal to humiliate and intimidate Empress Dowager Zhang and her family.

In 1522, Jiajing married Lady Chen, who was chosen by Empress Dowager Zhang as his Empress. Jiajing did not warm to his new bride and had little to do with her. In the spring of 1524, the Jiajing emperor refused her a formal audience on the occasion of her birthday, whereas several weeks earlier he had arranged elaborate ceremonies in honor of his mother's birthday. The officials who protested were arrested, and the emperor let it be known that he would not tolerate further criticism of his private life. He clearly intended to honor his mother at his aunt's expense in this and court ceremonies.

The following year, April 15, 1525, a fire destroyed Empress Dowager Zhang's residential palace. She and her entourage had to move to a smaller palace while the old palace was rebuilt. At first the emperor approved a suggestion to rebuild the palace on a smaller scale, since materials were needed for his fathers temple, which was then under construction. But in late August, he suggested that work on the palace be stopped, ostensibly to ease the burden on his subjects. Grand secretary Fei Hung noted that Empress Dowager Zhang was not at ease in her quarters, but the emperor was unmoved. In October, when the minister of works suggested that several of the emperor's building projects be halted, he agreed on one condition: that work on Empress Dowager Zhang's palace be halted as well.

Empress Dowager Zhang died in 1541 and was buried, with the least possible ceremony, with her husband.

== Patronage of art ==
The art during the Ming dynasty reflected the power acquired by Empress Zhang and other courtly women during her reign. The most famous and arguably most important piece attributed to Empress Zhang is a handscroll known as the Ordination Scroll, which depicts her ordination as a Taoist priestess in 1493. The original artist seems to be unknown, and it is currently located at the San Diego Museum of Art. The exhibition Taoism and the Arts of China mentions that in addition to the empress, the scroll includes a group of divine women called "jade maidens" as well as the Taoist priest who ordained her and several deities.

The Ordination Scroll is not the only artwork associated with the empress. She was an influence on numerous artworks by Wu Wei and possibly his colleagues and paintings attributed to Zhang Lu. Another painting known as Su Shi Returning to Court, a handscroll commonly attributed to Zhang Lu, seems to pertain to Empress Zhang as well. It does not depict the empress herself, yet Jennifer Purtle argues that Empress Zhang used this painting to compare herself to historical empresses.

Empress Zhang understood the influence of art and how it could validate her own power. Purtle describes Empress Zhang's power as "dominated", defining it as a power that is subtle and indirect, which is reflected in her patronage of the arts. Her influence also cleared the way for other court women to gain power during the Ming dynasty.

== Titles ==
- During the reign of the Chenghua Emperor (r. 1464–1487)
  - Lady Zhang (張氏; from 1471)
  - Crown Princess (太子妃; from 1487)
- During the reign of the Hongzhi Emperor (r. 1487–1505)
  - Empress (皇后; from 22 September 1487)
- During the reign of the Zhengde Emperor (r. 1505–1521)
  - Empress dowager (皇太后; from 19 June 1505)
  - Empress Dowager Cishou (慈寿皇太后; from 1510)
- During the reign of the Jiajing Emperor (r. 1521– 1567)
  - Empress Dowager Zhaoshengcishou (昭圣慈寿皇太后; from 1521)
  - Empress Xiàokāng Jìngsù Zhuāngcí Zhéyí Yìtiān Zànshèng Jìng (孝康靖肅莊慈哲懿翊天贊聖敬皇后; from 28 August 1541)
- During the reign of the Hongguang Emperor (r. 1644–1645)
  - Empress Xiàochéng Jìngsù Zhuāngcí Zhéyí Yìtiān Zànshèng Jìng (孝成靖肅莊慈哲懿翊天贊聖敬皇后; from 1644)

== Issue ==
- As empress:
  - Zhu Houzhao, the Zhengde Emperor (正德帝 朱厚照; 26 October 1491 – 20 April 1521), the Hongzhi Emperor's first son
  - Zhu Houwei, Prince Dao of Wei (蔚悼王 朱厚煒; 1 January 1495 – 9 March 1496), the Hongzhi Emperor's second son
  - Princess Taikang (太康公主; 15 February 1497 – 1 October 1498), personal name Xiurong (秀榮), the Hongzhi Emperor's first daughter

== Sources ==
- The Cambridge history of China: volume 7, the Ming dynasty, 1368-1644 by Frederick W. Mote, Denis Twitchett
- Biographical dictionary of Chinese women, Tang through Ming 618-1644. edited by: Lily Xiao Honglee, Sue Willes
- Ming dynasty history of empresses and concubines (明史后妃传)

Chinese royalty
Preceded by Empress Xiaozhenchun	Empress consort of China; 1487–1505	Succeeded by Empress Xiaojingyi
