= Zhengde Emperor =

Emperor of China from 1505 to 1521

Zhengde Emperor 正德帝
- Palace portrait on a hanging scroll

Emperor of the Ming dynasty
- Reign: 8 June 1505 – 20 April 1521
- Enthronement: 19 June 1505
- Predecessor: Hongzhi Emperor
- Successor: Jiajing Emperor
- Born: 14 November 1491; Shuntian Prefecture, Beizhili, Ming dynasty (present-day Beijing, China)
- Died: 20 April 1521 (aged 29); Leopard Quarter, Ming dynasty
- Burial: Kang Mausoleum, Ming tombs, Beijing, China
- Spouse: Empress Xiaojingyi (m. 1506)
Era dates
- Zhengde: (Note: Chinese: 正德; pinyin: Zhèngdé) 24 January 1506 – 27 January 1522
Posthumous name
- Emperor Chengtian Dadao Yingsu Ruizhe Zhaode Xiangong Hongwen Sixiao Yi (Note: Simplified Chinese: 承天达道英肃睿哲昭德显功弘文思孝毅皇帝; traditional Chinese: 承天達道英肅睿哲昭德顯功弘文思孝毅皇帝 (conferred by the Jiajing Emperor in 1521))
Temple name
- Wuzong (Note: Chinese: 武宗; pinyin: Wǔzōng)
- House: Zhu
- Dynasty: Ming
- Father: Hongzhi Emperor
- Mother: Empress Zhang

Chinese name
- Chinese: 正德帝
Transcriptions
Standard Mandarin
- Hanyu Pinyin: Zhèngdé Dì
- Wade–Giles: Chêng^{4}-tê^{2} Ti^{4}
- IPA: [ʈʂə̂ŋ.tɤ̌ tî]

The Zhengde Emperor (14 November 1491 – 20 April 1521), personal name Zhu Houzhao, (Note: Chinese: 朱厚㷖; pinyin: Zhū Hòuzhào) was the 11th emperor of the Ming dynasty of China, reigning from 1505 to 1521. He succeeded his father, the Hongzhi Emperor.

The Zhengde Emperor was the eldest and only surviving son of the Hongzhi Emperor. As heir to the throne, he received a Confucian education and was known for his intelligence during his studies. However, upon taking power, it became evident that he had a strong aversion to the Confucian-oriented bureaucracy and rejected the rituals and duties associated with it. He frequently clashed with ministers and grand secretaries, instead relying on court eunuchs, particularly the "Eight Tigers", with whom he had grown up. From 1506 to 1510, the eunuch Liu Jin effectively controlled the government, appointing his allies and supporters to important positions. The Emperor even moved out of the Forbidden City to the newly built "Leopard Quarter" where he surrounded himself with eunuchs and officers. After Liu Jin's downfall, the actor Zang Xian and officers Qian Ning and Jiang Bin became the Emperor's favorites, while Grand Secretary Yang Tinghe managed the general administration.

Liu Jin's administration was marked by high tax pressure and a decline in the government's authority, which ultimately led to multiple large-scale rebellions. These included the Prince of Anhua rebellion, the rebellion of 1510, and the Prince of Ning rebellion, the last of which was eventually quelled by the statesman and philosopher Wang Yangming. Looking for new sources of income, the Emperor lifted the ban on private foreign trade. This coincided with the arrival of Portuguese sailors in southern China, who began trading with Chinese partners.

In 1517, the Emperor spent the majority of his time on the Sino-Mongol border northwest of Beijing, primarily in the garrison town of Datong. During this time, he successfully repelled a major Mongol raid led by Dayan Khan. In 1519, he traveled to Nanjing, remaining there for most of 1520. On his return journey, he fell into the water while drunk and became ill. He died a few months later, leaving no children. Yang Tinghe, with the support of the deceased emperor's mother, Empress Dowager Zhang, placed his closest male relative, his thirteen-year-old cousin Zhu Houcong, on the throne.

== Early life and accession ==
Zhu Houzhao, the future Zhengde Emperor, was born on 14 November 1491 as the eldest son of the Hongzhi Emperor, the tenth emperor of China's Ming dynasty, and Empress Zhang. In 1492, his father named him heir to the throne. The Hongzhi Emperor saw himself in his son and took Zhu Houzhao with him when he traveled, supporting his interests in riding and archery, and pampering him. Zhu Houzhao was an excellent student, fulfilling his duties with care and courtesy.

The Hongzhi Emperor died on 8 June 1505. On his deathbed, he called upon his closest aides, the grand secretaries Liu Jian (劉健), Li Dongyang, and Xie Qian (謝遷), to faithfully serve his son. He assessed Zhu Houzhao as an intelligent young man, but also fond of comfort and pleasure. Therefore, he asked the grand secretaries to guide his son. On 19 June 1505, Zhu Houzhao ascended the throne as the tenth Ming emperor. His era name, Zhengde, comes from a quote from the Book of Documents and means "the rectification (zheng) of the people's virtue (de)".

== Style of government ==
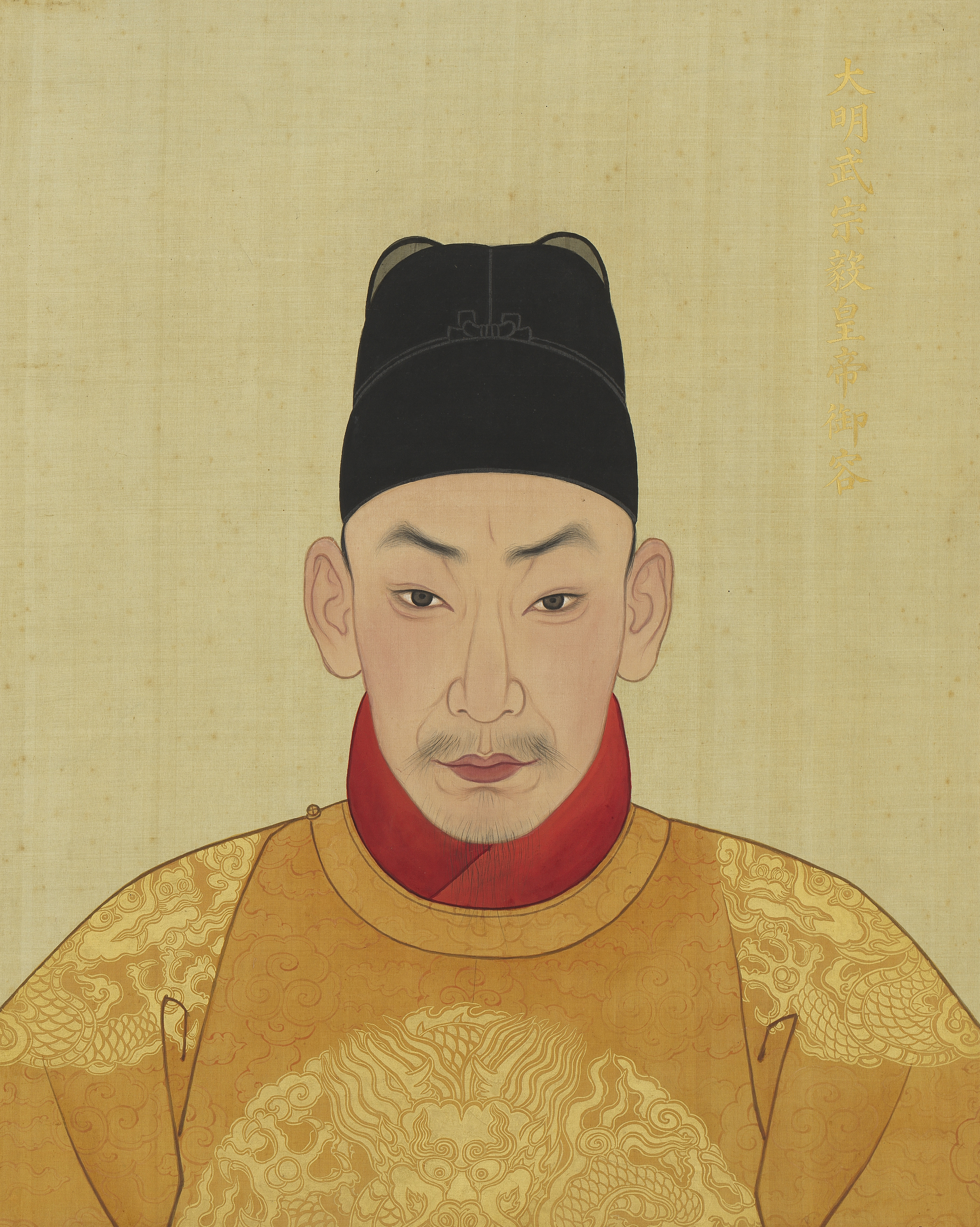
Portrait of the Zhengde Emperor

Upon ascending to the throne, the Zhengde Emperor inherited three major issues: insufficient state revenue, a vulnerable military presence on the northwestern border with the Mongols, and conflicts between the court eunuchs and officials regarding problem-solving methods. The Emperor tended to side with the eunuchs, disregarding the counsel of the grand secretaries. This disagreement between the ruler and his officials was partly due to a generational gap, as the Zhengde Emperor was young and the youngest grand secretary was fifty-six years old.

In contrast to his father, who exercised imperial authority sparingly, delegated power effectively, and dutifully fulfilled his responsibilities, the Zhengde Emperor showed little concern for state affairs. His restless spirit rebelled against official orthodoxy and he disregarded the meticulously prescribed ceremonial and ritual duties of an emperor. He resisted the objections and demands of officials, but readily fulfilled the requests and desires of the eunuchs. In the early years of his reign, he actively avoided official audiences and discussions on Confucian topics. This behavior was seen as a major concern for the Confucian-minded bureaucracy, as they believed that a monarch who adhered to all ceremonies, precedents, and duties was crucial for the functioning of the state. However, the Zhengde Emperor had a wide range of other interests, including riding, archery, hunting, and music. He was particularly fond of composing songs and singing, and he promoted music throughout the court. He also enjoyed playing games with his eunuchs, leading to the establishment of several imperial shops run by them. He supported various forms of entertainment, such as wrestling, acrobatics, magic, and fireworks. He often indulged in these activities with the eunuchs, neglecting his studies and getting drunk for days on end. He even refused to attend to state affairs, much to the dismay of the officials. He would often roam the streets of Beijing incognito in search of entertainment, causing great consternation among the officials.

One year after his accession, the Zhengde Emperor married an officer's daughter, Lady Xia, as his empress. He also took two other girls as consorts. However, he soon stopped living with the Empress. At the suggestion of Yu Yong (于永), a guard officer in Embroidered Uniform Guard who was of Central Asian origin, he summoned Uyghur dancers. His unrestrained behavior (Note: For example, once in a drunken state, he asked Yu Yong for his daughter, known for her beauty. Instead, Yu brought a girl from the neighborhood and resigned in favor of his son, to avoid being caught in a deceit. Other times, he pursued the wives of his officers, and was even charmed by the sister of a certain officer, who was already married and pregnant.) regularly shocked Confucian moralists, but it also made him famous in popular folklore.

Like his grandfather, the Chenghua Emperor, the Zhengde Emperor was drawn to Lamaism. He built a new temple for Tibetan monks in the Forbidden City and awarded them high titles and rewards. He also learned their script and participated in their ceremonies, even dressing in Tibetan clothing. He involved them in the rituals at the funeral of the Chenghua Emperor's widow, Grand Empress Dowager Wang, in 1518.

The Emperor held a negative view of officials, viewing them as corrupt and incompetent. He entrusted state affairs to eunuchs, appointing them to military and financial positions from the beginning of his reign. He actively avoided interacting with officials and instead relied on eunuchs to handle matters, as they never questioned his orders. He also valued their intelligence and entrusted them with supervising the armies on the borders and quelling rebellions within the country. They were also responsible for overseeing the production of silk and porcelain goods, as well as managing regional authorities. The Emperor generously rewarded them for their services, often granting their relatives aristocratic titles.

The Emperor's financial irresponsibility worsened the already dire state of state finances. While the Ministry of Revenue theoretically brought in 1.5 million liang in silver (equivalent to about 56 tons), the actual amount was much lower due to tax remissions and arrears. In the first year of his reign, the Emperor spent 1.4 million liang on donations and rewards, disregarding the advice of conservative officials who urged austerity. The eunuchs, on the other hand, were resourceful in finding new sources of revenue, such as transit taxes, taxes on pastures and wastelands, and levies on imperial estates. This further strengthened the Emperor's support for the eunuchs.

== Court under Liu Jin ==
Concerned about the Emperor's actions and the growing influence of eunuchs within his inner circle, particularly those led by Liu Jin, (Note: In 1506, Liu Jin convinced the Emperor that the lack of state revenue was due to the incompetence and corruption of officials responsible for finances. He proposed implementing controls and punishing any corrupt officials that were uncovered. In June 1506, to the dismay of the grand secretaries, he was tasked with overseeing the capital's garrison.) a group of high officials led by the grand secretaries Liu Jian and Xie Qian formed an alliance with senior eunuchs who also felt threatened by the same power shift. They accused the "Eight Tigers" (including Liu Jin and seven others), (Note: The remaining seven were Gu Dayong (谷大用), Zhang Yong, Gao Feng (高鳳), Ma Yongcheng (馬永成), Wei Bin (魏彬), Qiu Ju (丘聚), and Luo Xiang (羅祥).) who had served the Emperor since his childhood and entered his personal staff in 1505 after his accession, of wrongdoing. The officials demanded that Liu Jin be executed and the others punished. The senior eunuchs initially only wanted Liu Jin to be transferred to the south, but on 27 October 1506, Minister of Revenue Han Wen (韓文) petitioned for the execution of all eight. The Emperor refused to execute them but agreed to punish them. However, at the last minute, the Tigers convinced the Emperor that their accusers were conspiring against them in an attempt to gain power. Enraged, the Emperor exiled the eunuchs who had allied with Liu Jian and Xie Qian and promoted the Tigers. Liu Jian, Xie Qian, and others were forced to resign, while Li Dongyang remained in the Grand Secretariat, joined by allies of the Eight Tigers, including Jiao Fang (焦芳; 1436–1517), who had warned Liu Jin of the accusations.

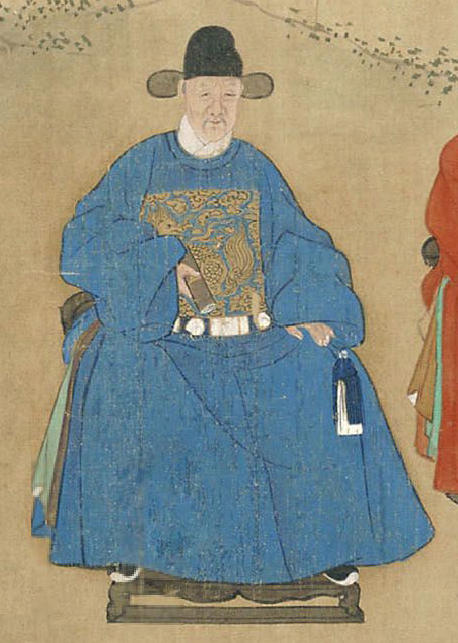
Portrait of Li Dongyang, c. 1503

From October 1506 to September 1510, the eunuch-official alliance, led by Liu Jin, dominated the court. During the initial months of his rule, Liu Jin eliminated his opponents from the Beijing authorities. In December 1506, Han Wen was dismissed due to accusations of abuse of power, and in February 1507, twenty-one officials who protested against the resignation of the grand secretaries were punished. Other officials were beaten, tortured, and dismissed. By the summer of 1507, Liu Jin had complete control over the government, and no important documents were approved without his consent.

The Emperor had been spending without any restrictions. In September 1507, he paid 350 thousand liang (13 tons) of silver just for the lanterns for the Lantern Festival. Additionally, the buildings in the imperial park south of Beijing were rebuilt, and he even built the "Leopard Quarter" (Bao Fang) northwest of the Forbidden City. Liu Jin focused on increasing the Emperor's income. He used the threat of heavy fines to force the officials responsible for finances and taxes to bring in the exact amount of money to Beijing. This caused great concern among government officials, as he also demanded levies and supplies from officials on the northern border and Beijing, which left their families impoverished. Furthermore, his agents extorted additional silver payments from mines in Fujian and Sichuan, and even organized illegal sales of salt beyond the quotas. When officials arrested them, they were arrested themselves.

The influence of the eunuchs continued to grow, as evidenced by the fact that in March 1507, the eunuch intendants in the provinces were granted equal status to the leading provincial officials. This gave them the authority to handle administrative and legal matters. Liu Jin attempted to reorganize the administration of the empire based on the principle of equality or even subordination of civilian and military officials to eunuchs. These reforms sparked strong opposition from officials, who were forced to comply through brutal terror. Liu Jin also faced hostility from other eunuchs, including the remaining seven "Tigers". He established a new agency to investigate the resistance among the eunuchs.

While Liu Jin focused on governing the state, the Emperor indulged in the pleasures of the new "Leopard Quarter", (Note: "Leopard Quarter" was the informal name given to the Zhengde Emperor's "New Palace", which was built northwest of the Forbidden City. This vast complex included an area for military exercises, a zoo, and a large park where the Emperor could enjoy hunting. In 1987, historian James Geiss presented the view in "The Leopard Quarter during the Cheng-te Reign" (Ming Studies, 1987, no. 24, pp. 1–38) that the Emperor's decision to move from the Forbidden City to the Leopard Quarter was a way to establish a new power center under his personal control, separate from the civilian bureaucratic apparatus. The purpose of this move was to restore the military foundation of imperial power, following the example of the first Ming emperors.) surrounded by flattering eunuchs, officers, musicians, lamas, and beauties. The Emperor had particular favorites, including Qian Ning, an officer of the "Embroidered Uniformed Guards" known for his strength and archery skills, and actor Zang Xian (臧賢), who was appointed deputy director of the Music Bureau for his musical talent. These favorites held significant influence over many officials and office seekers.

== Prince of Anhua rebellion and the fall of Liu Jin ==
Improving state income through higher taxation of military households caused widespread discontent in the borderlands. This led to a rebellion in Liaodong, which was eventually quelled by distributing 2,500 liang of silver among the malcontents. Zhu Zhifan, Prince of Anhua, took advantage of the discontent and attempted to seize power during rebellion in May 1510. Zhu Zhifan resided in Ningxia, a crucial fortress city on the Mongolian-Chinese border in northwestern Shaanxi. This city served as the headquarters for one of the nine border military regions. Believing himself to be a potential candidate for the throne, Zhu Zhifan gathered a group of loyalists, including officers from the Ningxia garrison and members of the local gentry. In the spring of 1510, he gained the support of other officers and on 12 May, he took control of Ningxia and its surrounding areas, declaring a campaign against Liu Jin, but the rebellion did not spread as the commanders of the garrisons in Lingzhou and Yansui opposed the rebels. By 30 May, the prince was captured by a pro-government general, who had apparently joined the uprising. The rebellion quickly collapsed and all the rebels were captured within days.

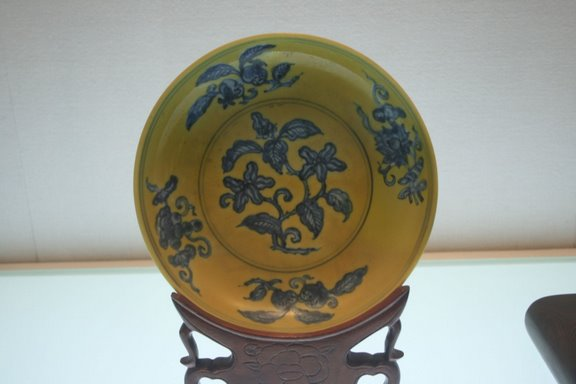
Porcelain plate from the Zhengde era; Nanjing Museum

The Emperor, after consulting with his grand secretaries and ministers, implemented a comprehensive set of counterinsurgency measures. He appointed Shen Ying (神英), Earl of Jingyang, and Censor-in-chief Yang Yiqing to oversee the situation in Ningxia. Both had previous experience in the region, making them well-equipped to handle the task successfully. In addition, he promoted several officers from the Ningxia garrison, offered amnesty to lower-ranking rebels, and promised rewards for those who returned to the government's side. He also allocated a significant sum of money for this purpose. As a precaution, he granted amnesty for minor offenses to all princes. Furthermore, he dispatched Zhang Yong, one of the Eight Tigers, to Ningxia with a force of 30,000 soldiers from the Beijing garrison. This was the first time in the history of the Ming dynasty that a eunuch had been given a separate command. To support the troops in Xuanfu, Datong, and Yansui, the commanders were provided with a million liang of silver to cover the costs of troop movements.

During the campaign, Yang Yiqing convinced Zhang Yong to turn against Liu Jin by warning him that his life was in danger due to Liu Jin's plans for another coup. Upon returning to Beijing, Zhang Yong joined forces with the other six "Tigers" and on 13 September 1510, they accused Liu Jin of plotting against the Emperor. It was reported that Liu Jin intended to assassinate the Emperor and place his own great-nephew on the throne. Despite the Emperor's initial reluctance to believe the accusations, the group was able to persuade him. The following day, Liu Jin was transferred to Nanjing and his property were seized. The Emperor ordered Liu's execution upon seeing the vast amount of weapons and treasures that Liu had accumulated, (Note: Different authors cite different numbers. Goodrich mentions 300,000 liang of gold, 50 million liang of silver, and 25 bushels of precious stones; Barmé reports 2.5 million liang of gold and silver, two golden suits of armor, 25 pounds of precious stones, 3,000 gold rings and brooches, 500 gold plates, and over 4,000 gem-encrusted belts; Eberhard lists 57,800 pieces of gold and 240,000 (ten times heavier) gold bars, 791,800 liang of silver and 5 million silver bars (in units of five liang), 3 bushels of precious stones, two golden armors, 3,000 gold rings, and many other items.) despite Liu's insistence on his innocence. Liu Jin was arrested on 16 September, and his three-day execution by lingchi, or "slow slicing", began on 27 September.

Liu's downfall led to the removal of his allies, and his reforms were reversed. Any documents related to his proposed reforms were destroyed, effectively rendering his efforts to change the administrative structure of the Ming dynasty and increase the Emperor's direct control through eunuch officials futile.

== Rebellions in northern and central China ==
The northern provinces of the Ming Empire were relatively poor, despite the presence of the capital city, and even the Beizhili metropolitan area was impoverished. Many poor men from the surrounding areas of Beijing chose to be castrated in hopes of gaining wealth and influence as eunuchs in the Emperor's court. During the Zhengde era, over 3,500 eunuchs applied for positions in the Forbidden City, but only a small percentage were successful. The majority of unsuccessful applicants were forced to live on the fringes of society or turn to a life of crime. The presence of imperial estates, the land of the imperial family, and the aristocracy further exacerbated the problems in the northern region. According to modern estimates, these estates covered 15–40% of the land in the Beizhili erea. These estates were often beyond the control of local authorities, as they were responsible for collecting taxes and levies themselves, which amounted to about a third of the harvest. On the other hand, the owners of these estates preferred to manage them directly, often hiring eunuchs and administrators to oversee their operations. These administrators often recruited individuals who were not registered in official population records, including deserters and local criminals.

In the summer of 1509, the security situation south of Beijing deteriorated as Liu Jin's attempts to raise levies on military households resulted in desertions. This led to banded deserters plundering the countryside. In 1510, a large number of these deserters organized into a unified group based in Wen'an, located 130 km south of Beijing, and began planning a rebellion. Although their leader was captured, the rebellion still flared up. By February 1511, the rebels had amassed several thousand horsemen and were attacking cities; however, the government's army sent to stop them was ineffective. The officials leading the troops preferred negotiations, and the soldiers avoided fighting. In August 1511, the rebels even besieged Wen'an. Reinforcements were called in from the borderlands and the command was changed, but there was no success. In one ambush, the bandits burned a thousand ships that were importing grain to the capital via the Grand Canal. In November 1511, the command of the government troops was once again changed, but it had little impact. In January 1512, the rebels launched an attack on Bazhou, which is located 100 km south of Beijing. The army received reinforcements from the borderlands—Xuanfu, Datong, and Liaodong—but it was not until the summer of 1512 that the rebels were finally defeated. Some of them retreated south across the Yangtze River to Jiangxi, while others went east to Shandong, and the remaining rebels headed southwest to the city of Wuhan on the Yangtze River. From there, with a force of 800 men, they sailed downstream and plundered before being destroyed by a typhoon off Tongzhou on 28 August. They were slaughtered by a government force at Langshan, near the mouth of the Yangtze River, on 7 September 1512, marking the formal end of the campaign.

The security and supply of the capital were no longer under threat, but banditry continued to be a problem in Jiangxi, Henan, and central Sichuan. The first instance of trouble with rebels occurred in Sichuan in 1508. By 1509, these rebels had joined forces with those from Shanxi, forming a single army of 100,000 men. This posed a threat not only to the security of Huguang, but also to the surrounding areas. The rebel leaders declared themselves kings (wang) and began to establish their own administrative systems. Another group of rebels was active in southern Sichuan and carried out raids in Guizhou and northern Sichuan. The government attempted to use non-Chinese tribes to fight against the rebels, but the Miao tribes instead joined forces with the southern Sichuan rebels. Despite this, the government was able to gradually suppress the rebellion in Sichuan and ultimately eliminate it by 1514.

In 1511, there were also rebel groups in the mountains of Jiangxi, which were eventually defeated with the help of mercenaries from non-Chinese tribes from neighboring provinces in 1513. In 1517, another rebellion erupted in the south of Jiangxi, and Wang Yangming was sent to the area as a grand coordinator to restore order in 1518.

== Qian Ning and Jiang Bin ==
After the downfall of Liu Jin, the Emperor faced financial difficulties and, due to the refusal of officials to change the established order, he turned to eunuchs for extraordinary acquisitions. Those who opposed this were harshly punished. One of the leading eunuchs was Wei Bin, who took over the Directorate of Ceremonial. The Emperor's attention was also drawn to military matters and officers due to problems with bandits near the capital. Among the officers, Qian Ning, the commander of the palace guard, became the Emperor's favorite. He impressed the Emperor with his archery and military skills, and later by catering to his personal preferences by procuring musicians, Muslim women for the harem, and Tibetan monks who were experts in tantric Buddhism.

In 1512, a twenty-year-old officer named Jiang Bin from the Xuanfu garrison caught the attention of the Emperor after his bravery in a battle against rebels the previous year. Despite being hit by three arrows, including one in the ear, Jiang continued to fight and became the Emperor's new favorite. He proposed a rotation of units, suggesting that experienced soldiers from the borderlands be brought to Beijing to fight the rebels, while the soldiers from the capital would be sent to the borders instead. Grand Secretary Li Dongyang strongly opposed this idea, arguing that the soldiers from Beijing lacked combat experience and would struggle on the border, while the border guards would struggle to maintain order in the capital. Li resigned in protest in February 1513 after the Emperor refused to listen to his objections. Despite this, the Emperor went ahead with the plan and the first soldiers from Xuanfu began serving in Beijing in February 1513.

Border guards were stationed in four camps within the Imperial City area, with the Zhengde Emperor viewing them as his personal army and considering himself their general. He had a particular fondness for four officers—Jiang Bin, Xu Tai (許泰), Shen Zhou, and Liu Hui (劉暉). He entrusted the first two with the command of the Beijing garrison, including the newly arrived units. Gradually, he developed a taste for military finery and uniforms, even personally training a group of eunuchs in military skills. In addition to his military pursuits, the Emperor also enjoyed hunting, but in September 1514, he was injured by a tiger, which left him bedridden for a month. Despite this, he remained unwilling to give up his pleasures and instead transferred officials who advised him to be more cautious outside of Beijing.

The Zhengde Emperor had a great love for lanterns. In early 1514, his distant relative Zhu Chenhao, Prince of Ning, presented him with several hundred new lanterns and experts to install them for the New Year celebrations. However, the Emperor had yurts built in front of the palace for military exercises, some of which stored gunpowder. During the celebrations on 10 February 1514, the dust from the lanterns accidentally exploded, causing a massive fire in the palaces of the Forbidden City. The Emperor had a complex of 162 yurts built for himself in the Forbidden City. The restoration of the burned palaces lasted until 1521, with 30,000 soldiers from the Beijing garrison working on it and costing over 1 million liang of silver.

== Travels to the northwest ==
In the beginning of 1516, the Zhengde Emperor, tired of constant criticism from officials, began to consider the idea of going to Xuanfu. Jiang Bin, in an attempt to separate the Emperor from Qian Ning, convinced the Emperor that Xuanfu had better musicians and women, and that he would have real battles with the Mongols on the border instead of simulated ones in Beijing. In mid-August 1517, the Emperor finally made the journey to Xuanfu. After five days, he arrived at the Juyong Pass, located 50 km northwest of Beijing, but the censor in charge of the pass refused to open the gate without an edict signed by both Empress Xia and Empress Dowager Zhang. Unable to proceed beyond the pass, the Emperor decided to return. He made another attempt a month later, this time passing through the pass while the censor was absent. He left a reliable eunuch, Gu Dayong, in charge with strict orders not to let any officials through. Finally, in mid-September 1517, the Emperor arrived at Xuanfu.

Enthralled by his new surroundings, the Emperor decided to settle here and embarked on the construction of a grand mansion at a great expense. He even went as far as to abandon the use of the imperial seal and instead titled himself as a general. Despite protests from the grand secretaries, he disregarded their objections. He then demanded that they send him one million liang (37 tons) of silver, but they refused, citing that the Ministry of Revenue only had a reserve of 350,000 liang. After much negotiation, the Minister of Revenue reluctantly agreed to send 500,000 liang. The Zhengde Emperor ordered the guards at the Beijing gates to prevent any officials from entering the city in January 1518.

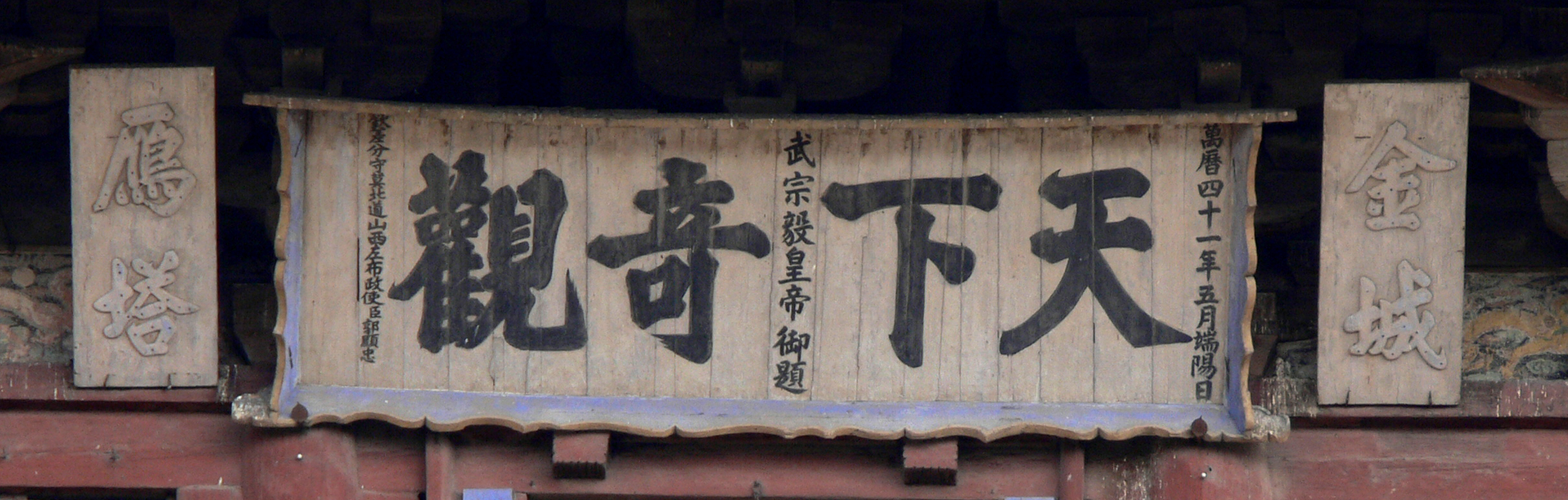
The Zhengde Emperor's calligraphic plaque reading "Wonder of the World" (天下奇觀; Tiānxià qíguān) on the Pagoda of Fogong Temple in Yingzhou.

In October 1517, the Mongol Dayan Khan led a raid into Chinese territory with 50,000 horsemen. The Emperor, eager for a fight, sent an army to confront them. After a few minor skirmishes, a major battle took place on 18 October at Yingzhou, located 65 km south of Datong. The following day, the Emperor arrived with reinforcements and on 20 October, he personally led a day-long battle. The Mongols were ultimately defeated and forced to retreat across the border. This was the only instance in the entire 16th century where a Ming army successfully defeated a major Mongol raid. In recognition of their bravery, the Zhengde Emperor decorated a large number of officers and soldiers, including Jiang Bin and Xu Tai, who were both granted the title of count.

In mid-February 1518, the Emperor returned to Beijing for a twenty-day visit. In March, he traveled to Xuanfu once again. On 22 March 1518, he returned to Beijing to arrange the funeral of his step-grandmother, Lady Wang. In May, he inspected the imperial tombs and then visited the garrison at Miyun, which is located 65 km northeast of Beijing. He then returned to Beijing for Lady Wang's funeral, which began on 22 July. In August 1518, he forced the grand secretaries to write an edict naming him "Zhu Shou" (朱壽; "Long-life Zhu") and granting him the titles of general and duke for his successes in fighting against the Mongols. He returned to his "home" in Xuanfu in September 1518, and then traveled to Datong and Yansui. In January-February 1519, he headed to Beijing via Taiyuan and arrived there in March 1519.

Upon his return, the Zhengde Emperor announced his intention to travel to Shandong and the southern region, but the grand secretaries, ministers, and censors strongly opposed his decision. Despite mass arrests and beatings, which resulted in the deaths of twelve or fourteen officials, the protests continued. The main concern behind the protests was not just the journey itself, but also the fear of the Prince of Ning's potential plots to assassinate the Emperor during the trip. Due to the widespread defiance of the officials, the Emperor ultimately decided to postpone his trip.

== Prince of Ning rebellion ==
Zhu Chenhao, Prince of Ning, belonged to a minor branch of the Ming dynasty, which was based in Nanchang, the capital of the southern Chinese province of Jiangxi. Driven by ambition and a desire for greatness, he sought to gain power and influence. In order to achieve this, he initially resorted to bribery, targeting Liu Jin. After Liu's downfall, his main supporters in the government were Zang Xian, Qian Ning, and Lu Wan (who served as minister of war from 1513 to 1515, and then as minister of personnel). Through their help, he was able to obtain permission to establish a personal guard and gain authority over local military garrisons and members of the imperial family.

Zhu Chenhao built his own armed force from local "strong men". His actions sparked numerous complaints from Jiangxi, with reports of land grabbing, excessive taxation, and intimidation of officials. Despite the severe punishment typically imposed on princes for even minor offenses, his behavior was overlooked. In an attempt to gain power through non-violent means, he sought to exploit the Emperor's lack of an heir. In the spring of 1516, he bribed Qian Ning and others to summon his eldest son to Beijing as a candidate for heir, but this plan ultimately failed.

The Zhengde Emperor was only made aware of the issue with the Prince of Ning in the summer of 1519, when Jiang Bin and Zhang Yong convinced him of the prince's and Qian Ning's misconduct. The prince had received information from his spies in Beijing about unfavorable developments, prompting him to openly rebel in Nanchang on 10 July 1519. He claimed that the Zhengde Emperor was an impostor and not a member of the imperial family, and that the Empress had ordered his dethronement. His vanguard departed from Nanchang and headed north, taking control of Jiujiang on the Yangtze River on 13 July and beginning the siege of Anqing (a prefectural seat on the Yangtze River, 240 km from Nanjing) on 23 July. On 14 July, Wang Yangming, the governor of southern Jiangxi, learned of the rebellion and immediately began assembling an army. He also fed the prince false information about the movements of government troops and the betrayal of his closest confidants. Believing this misinformation, the prince cautiously retreated to Anqing with his main forces (consisting of 60,000–70,000 soldiers) until 26 July, but their attempt to capture Anqing failed and resulted in heavy losses. At the same time, Wang Yangming's army had gathered and took control of Nanchang on 14 August. The prince then returned south with his main forces, but was defeated in a three-day river battle at Lake Poyang, resulting in his capture by Wang's army.

== Southern tour ==
The Prince of Ning's rebellion gave the Zhengde Emperor a solid justification for taking the southern tour. He departed from Beijing on 15 September 1519. He arrived in Nanjing in January 1520 and stayed there for eight months. During this time, he mostly indulged in leisure activities. While the alcohol he consumed was relatively harmless, a decree was issued shortly before his arrival in Nanjing that banned the breeding and killing of pigs. This sparked outrage among the population, as it was believed by Muslims (who held influence in the Emperor's court) that pigs were impure and could spread diseases. This ban may have also contributed to the negative perception of the phrase "kill a pig" among the Emperor's court, as the word for pig (豬) had the same pronunciation as the imperial family's surname (朱). Additionally, the Emperor's habit of taking women for himself caused resentment among his subjects. Some women were forced into the imperial harem, while others were able to buy their way out or bribe officials who were extorting women from their households. However, many women ended up in the imperial laundries in Beijing. The number of women was overwhelming, leading to overcrowding and lack of resources, resulting in cases of malnutrition and starvation. Furthermore, the Emperor's frequent hunting trips with a large entourage in the densely populated south were deeply unpopular among the people.

The Emperor dispatched soldiers from the north, led by Jiang Bin and the eunuch Zhang Yong, to Jiangxi. Their goal was to prevent Wang Yangming from achieving victory by staging a fake battle and capturing the prince on behalf of the Emperor. Wang refused to cooperate and instead worked to minimize the impact of the troops' presence in Jiangxi, earning him widespread admiration.

During the Prince of Ning's trial, all of his associates were charged, but Wang had the foresight to destroy most of the prince's records, which documented his dealings with local elites. This ensured that only the main conspirators could be prosecuted. Zang Xian and Qian Ning were arrested in December 1519, followed by the arrest of minister Lu Wan and a group of eunuchs and imperial guards in December 1520. All of them were subsequently executed.

== Return to the north, illness, and death ==
The Zhengde Emperor remained in Nanjing until 23 September 1520, before departing for the north. His journey was plagued by constant drunkenness, which ultimately took a toll on him on 25 October. While fishing in Qingjiangpu (in present-day Huaiyin), his boat capsized and he was rescued by his panic-stricken attendants. His excessive alcohol consumption had already weakened his health, and he fell seriously ill. Despite his condition, he continued his journey without stopping until he reached Tongzhou, located east of Beijing, in December 1520.

The Emperor was gravely ill and his death was imminent. Jiang Bin requested a transfer to Xuanfu in order to have control over succession decisions while the Emperor was away from officials, but the Emperor's condition was too weak. Eventually, the doctor convinced him to travel to Beijing for better recovery before his next trip. On 18 January 1521, he arrived in Beijing with great ceremony. Just three days later, while performing a ritual at the Temple of Heaven, he collapsed and had to be carried back to the palace. He died three months later on 20 April 1521 in the Leopard Quarter. He was given the temple name Wuzong and the posthumous name Emperor Yi, and was buried in the Kang Mausoleum. He died without leaving an heir.

== Succession ==
Jiang Bin's plan was to take control of the imperial city and place the Emperor's distant relative, Zhu Junzhang, a prince from Datong, on the throne. In order to do so, he needed to be present with the Emperor at the time of his death, in order to claim that he was acting on the Emperor's orders. His first step was to forge a decree on 15 April, which would give him authority over the border troops stationed in Beijing, but his plan failed because he was not by the Zhengde Emperor's side when he died. Instead, two eunuchs recorded the Emperor's supposed last words, which stated that his mother, Empress Dowager Zhang, and the grand secretaries would rule the empire.

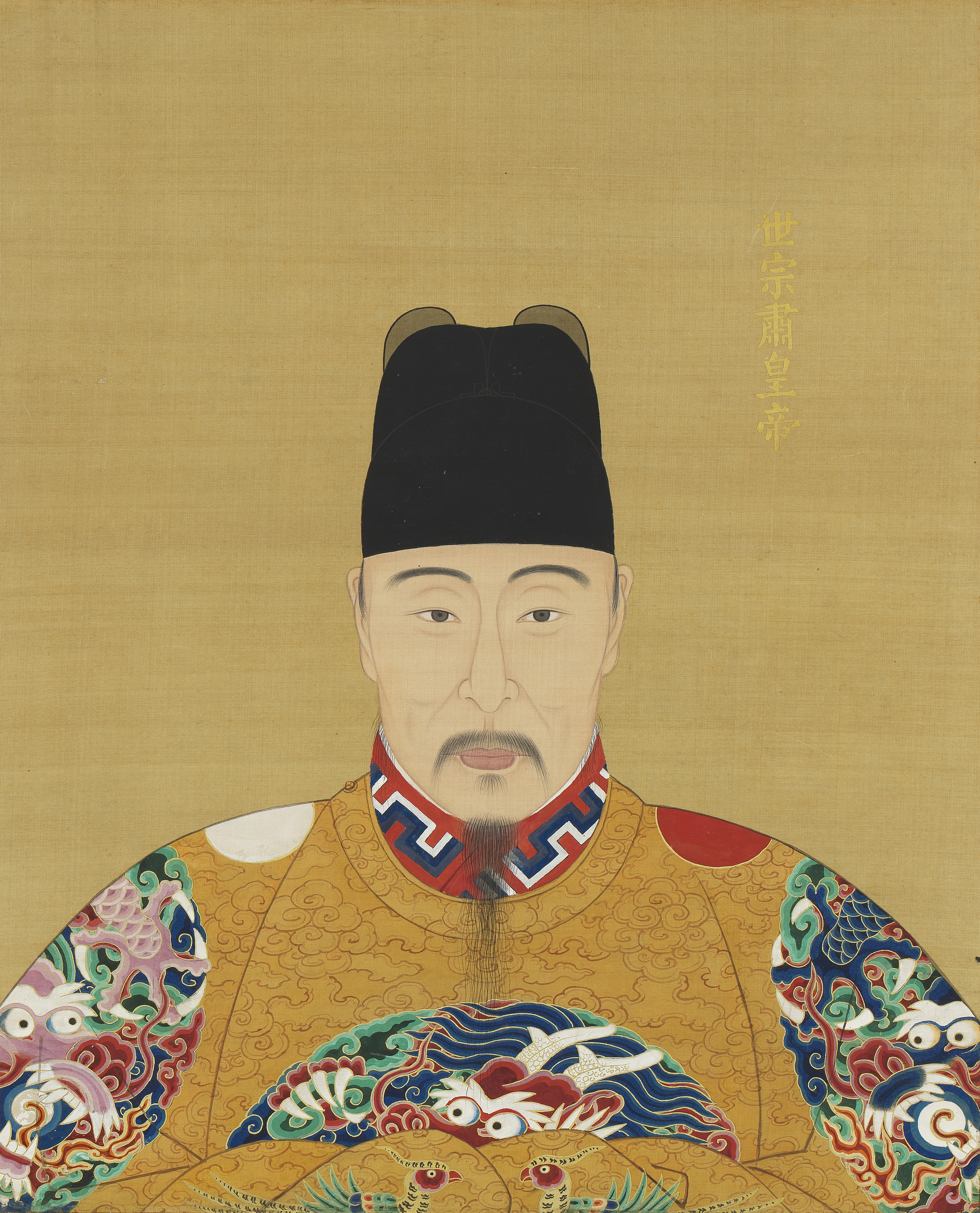
A Ming dynasty portrait of Zhu Houcong, the Zhengde Emperor's cousin and eventual successor

Grand Secretary Yang Tinghe oversaw plans to put the Emperor's closest cousin, thirteen-year-old Zhu Houcong, on the throne. Zhu Houcong was the son of Zhu Youyuan, Prince of Xing, who had died in 1519. By noon on 20 April, Yang Tinghe had received the Empress Dowager's approval and the matter was settled, but Minister of Personnel Wang Qiong (1459–1532) insisted on convening a general assembly to discuss the new emperor.

Jiang Bin was a powerful figure with his own army, making him a potential threat. On 22 April, he returned to the Forbidden City where he was informed by Yang Tinghe about a decree to return border troops from Beijing to the border. This meant that Jiang's main support was taken away from him. Despite being urged by his allies to take action, he hesitated and was eventually arrested on 24 April. Yang obtained permission for his arrest from the eunuch-heads of the Directorate of Ceremonial, Wei Bin and Zhang Rui (張銳), in exchange for the other eunuchs being granted immunity. Only Jiang's allies among the officers were arrested with him. With Jiang out of the way, Yang was able to secure the succession and rule the empire virtually indefinitely. He dismissed the eunuch inspectors from the border garrisons, sent the border troops in Beijing back to the border, and sent foreign envoys, monks from the Leopard Quarter, artisans, entertainers, and women who had been assembled by the Emperor in Beijing back to their respective homes. All of this was done under the guise of carrying out the Zhengde Emperor's will, even though the Emperor left no will. Most of the Zhengde Emperor's favorites were recalled and faced punishment, demotion, or exile. Jiang's wealth was also confiscated, including 70 chests of gold and 2,200 chests of silver.

== Economy and culture ==
=== Currency ===
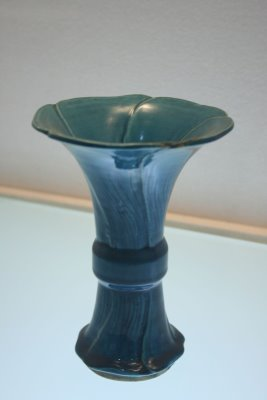
Porcelain vase from the Zhengde era; Nanjing Museum

In 1503, after a hiatus of seventy years, the government resumed the production of coins. They attempted to bolster their value by issuing a decree that reduced the worth of coins from previous dynasties by half, and by reiterating the prohibition on the use of privately minted coins. By 1507, it became evident that the new coins were not performing well, and the government was forced to accept the old coins at their full value. Private minting continued to thrive, with profits exceeding expenses by five times. The state eventually shut down the mints again in 1509.

During the last decades of the 15th century, private coins were the dominant currency, and the Hongwu era coins from the early years of the dynasty were no longer in circulation. Officials referred to Tang and Song coins as "old coins" (guqian, jiuqian), while merchants in the market referred to them as "good coins" (haoqian). The "new coins" of the first decade of the 16th century were known as "bogus coins" (daohao) and were only valued at half their face value by merchants. In the Zhengde era, their value decreased even further to only a third or a quarter of their face value.

After 1510, merchants generally preferred old coins. Ming coins were only accepted at half their face value, while private light coins were only worth a quarter of their face value. However, it was the latter that dominated the market. In the early 1520s in Jiangnan, good coins that had previously been in circulation alongside new ones disappeared, leaving only the new, light coins. By 1527, the value of these coins had dropped to one-fifth or even one-tenth of their nominal value.

=== Relations with Southeast Asia and the arrival of the Portuguese ===
During the Hongzhi and Zhengde eras, the government showed little interest in Southeast Asia, in stark contrast to the early 15th century when it actively enforced "Pax Ming" in the region. Even when the Portuguese showed aggression towards Malacca and the Sultan there requested help, the Beijing politicians remained lethargic, but foreign trade with Southeast Asia continued to thrive. In 1510, local authorities recognized the separation of maritime trade and tribute relations and began taxing merchant ships arriving from abroad. By 1517, the import tax was set at 20% of the value of the ship's cargo. This de facto legalization of foreign trade led to its expansion, benefiting buyers and increasing government revenues. However, the uncontrolled mobility of traders, often armed, caused concern among some officials, who called for restrictions on trade and the establishment of order. These officials' views gained the upper hand after the death of the Zhengde Emperor and the rise of the Jiajing government, resulting in an anti-trade ordinance in 1524.

In 1513, the first Portuguese explorer, Jorge Álvares, arrived in China. Three years later, in 1516, Portuguese captain Rafael Perestrello arrived in Guangzhou with his ship, which had a Malayan crew. This marked the beginning of trade between China and Europe. The following year, Fernão Pires de Andrade's squadron sailed from Malacca to China with the intention of establishing official trade and diplomatic relations. The envoy, Tomé Pires, carried a letter from King Manuel I of Portugal to the Chinese emperor and stayed in Guangzhou until the beginning of 1520, when he was finally able to travel to the imperial court. Despite the assistance of Jiang Bin, he was unable to secure an audience with the Zhengde Emperor in the summer of 1520 in Nanjing, where the Emperor was staying at the time, or later in Beijing. After the Zhengde Emperor's death in April 1521, the new government refused to accept him and sent him back to Guangzhou.

Fernão de Andrade's brother, Simão de Andrade, incited the anger of the Chinese with his aggressive actions and the purchase of children, including those who were kidnapped from wealthy families. Rumors began to circulate in Guangzhou that the Portuguese were cannibals who consumed children (although in reality, they were selling them into slavery, and some were later discovered in Diu, India). The Portuguese's defiance of Ming authorities led to armed conflicts, and in 1521, a Ming fleet defeated them at the Battle of Tunmen. The Portuguese were expelled from China. Upon returning to the south, Tomé Pires was held responsible by the local authorities for the violent behavior of his comrades and was imprisoned. He ultimately died in prison in 1524.

In addition to new crops, syphilis also spread from America to China. It first appeared in Guangzhou in 1505, even before the arrival of the Portuguese.

=== Culture ===
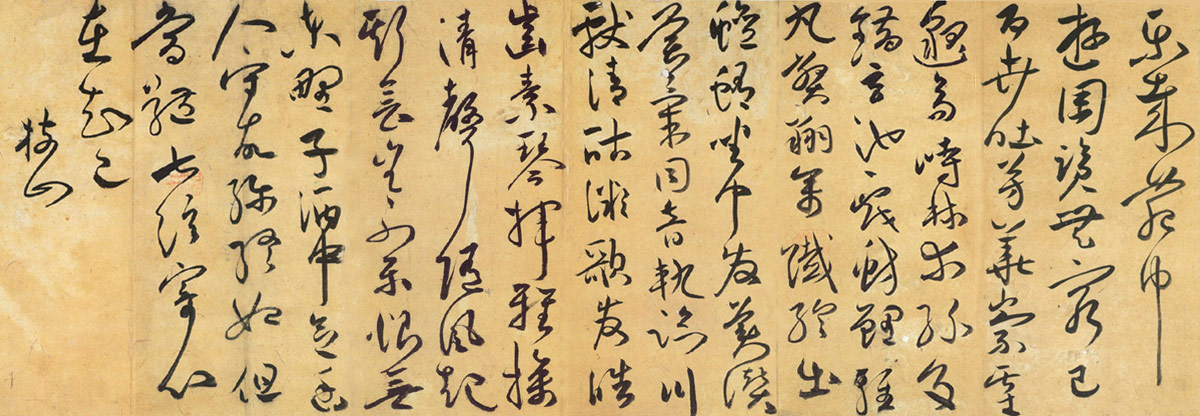
A sample of Zhu Yunming's cursive script

The Zhengde Emperor was known for his love of songwriting and singing, as well as his appreciation for court music. He also placed a strong emphasis on funding the arts. During his reign, the production of high-quality porcelain, including blue and white, polychrome, monochrome, and enameled varieties, flourished for export. These pieces often featured inscriptions in Sanskrit, Persian, and Arabic. In addition, a new type of pottery called Yixing pottery was developed in the region west of Lake Tai, which was referred to as "boccaro" by the Portuguese.

During the Zhengde Emperor's reign, there was also a significant development in Neo-Confucian philosophy, thanks to the work of Wang Yangming, who is considered the most important thinker of the Ming era. Unlike Zhu Xi, who focused on the concept of li (principle), Wang Yangming centered his philosophy around the idea of xin (heart/mind). He also developed a theory of the unity of cognition and action.

Publishers had begun to release collections of songs in colloquial language during the Chenghua Emperor's reign, but it was during the Zhengde Emperor's reign that the number of published collections saw a significant increase. This could be attributed to the Zhengde Emperor's popularity as a singer and the growing popularity of theater during that time. One of the most influential figures in literature during this period was Li Dongyang, a grand secretary who wrote poems in the secretariat style and emphasized the importance of scholars with broad knowledge (taking Song's Ouyang Xiu as his role model). He also played a crucial role in educating and inspiring a new generation of writers and poets. In Jiangnan, the hub of artistic activity, the most prominent calligraphers, painters, and poets included Wen Zhengming (1470–1559). Wen was a master of poetry, calligraphy, and painting, and was known for his monochrome or lightly colored landscapes in the style of Shen Zhou, as well as his "green-blue landscapes" in the Tang style. He was particularly skilled in regular and seal script as a calligrapher. Another highly admired artist of the time was Zhu Yunming, who was known for his "crazy cursive script". Tang Yin was also recognized for his semi-cursive script, landscapes, and figure painting.

== Legacy ==
Classical historians were highly critical of Liu Jin's group, despite their efforts to improve administration efficiency, halt the decline of central authority, and prevent officials from prioritizing personal interests. These reforms, which predated similar efforts by Zhang Juzheng, were met with rejection by the conservative faction of the bureaucracy due to their initiation by eunuchs. This gave the critics another reason to condemn Liu's clique.

The call-up of front-line units to Beijing, even for a short period, disrupted the traditional organization of the army, hindered unit training, and resulted in insubordination in some units. In particular, detachments from Datong rebelled multiple times.

Due to the Emperor's refusal to fulfill his government duties, the true power shifted to the eunuch Liu Jin, who was well-versed in the traditional ways of governing, but as time went on, the Emperor's favorites among the officers gained more influence, leading to chaos that the grand secretaries and ministers struggled to rectify. Eventually, the executive power shifted from the Emperor (who was aided by eunuchs) to the Grand Secretariat, particularly its leader. In 1521, Yang Tinghe was able to assume almost imperial powers in contrast to his predecessor, Li Dongyang, who was the last of the old-style grand secretaries. As imperial power weakened, the social status of educated officials in their communities rose. With the added benefit of tax exemption, they expanded their land holdings, placing the burden of taxes on the common people. Despite efforts to halt this trend, it persisted until the end of the dynasty.

After the Zhengde Emperor's death without a direct heir, the succession passed to his cousin. This sparked the Great Rites Controversy, a contentious dispute over the status of the new emperor's parents.

The negative portrayal of the Zhengde Emperor by Chinese classical historians, which began as early as the 16th century, has also been adopted in the West. For example, the Dictionary of Ming Biography, 1368–1644 includes a sharply negative entry on the Emperor. (Note: For negative coverage of the Zhengde Emperor by the Dictionary of Ming Biography, see Goodrich & Fang 1976, pp. 307–315.) The most comprehensive Western work on the Zhengde Emperor, as of 2001, was the chapter "The Cheng-te reign, 1506–1521" (pp. 403–439) in The Cambridge History of China: Volume 7, The Ming Dynasty, 1368–1644, Part 1 (1988) by James Geiss.

== Consorts ==
- Empress Xiaojingyi (孝靜毅皇后) of the Xia clan (夏氏; 1492–1535)
- Consort Shuhuide (淑惠德妃) of the Wu clan (吳氏; d. 1539)
- Consort Rongshuxian (榮淑賢妃) of the Shen clan (沈氏; d. 1542)
- Consort (妃) of the Wang clan (王氏)
- Beauty (美人) of the Liu clan (劉氏)
- Wang Mantang (王满堂; 1471–1541)
- Lady Ma (馬氏)
- Lady Dai (戴氏)
- Lady Bai (白氏)
- Lady Du (杜氏)
- Lady Zhang (張氏)

== See also ==
- Family tree of Chinese monarchs (late)
- Zhengde Tongbao

== Notes ==
Zhengde Emperor House of Zhu Born: 27 October 1491 Died: 20 April 1521
Regnal titles
Preceded by Hongzhi Emperor	Emperor of the Ming dynasty 8 June 1505 – 20 April 1521	Succeeded by Jiajing Emperor
