= Forbidden City =

Imperial palace complex in Beijing, China

Forbidden City 紫禁城
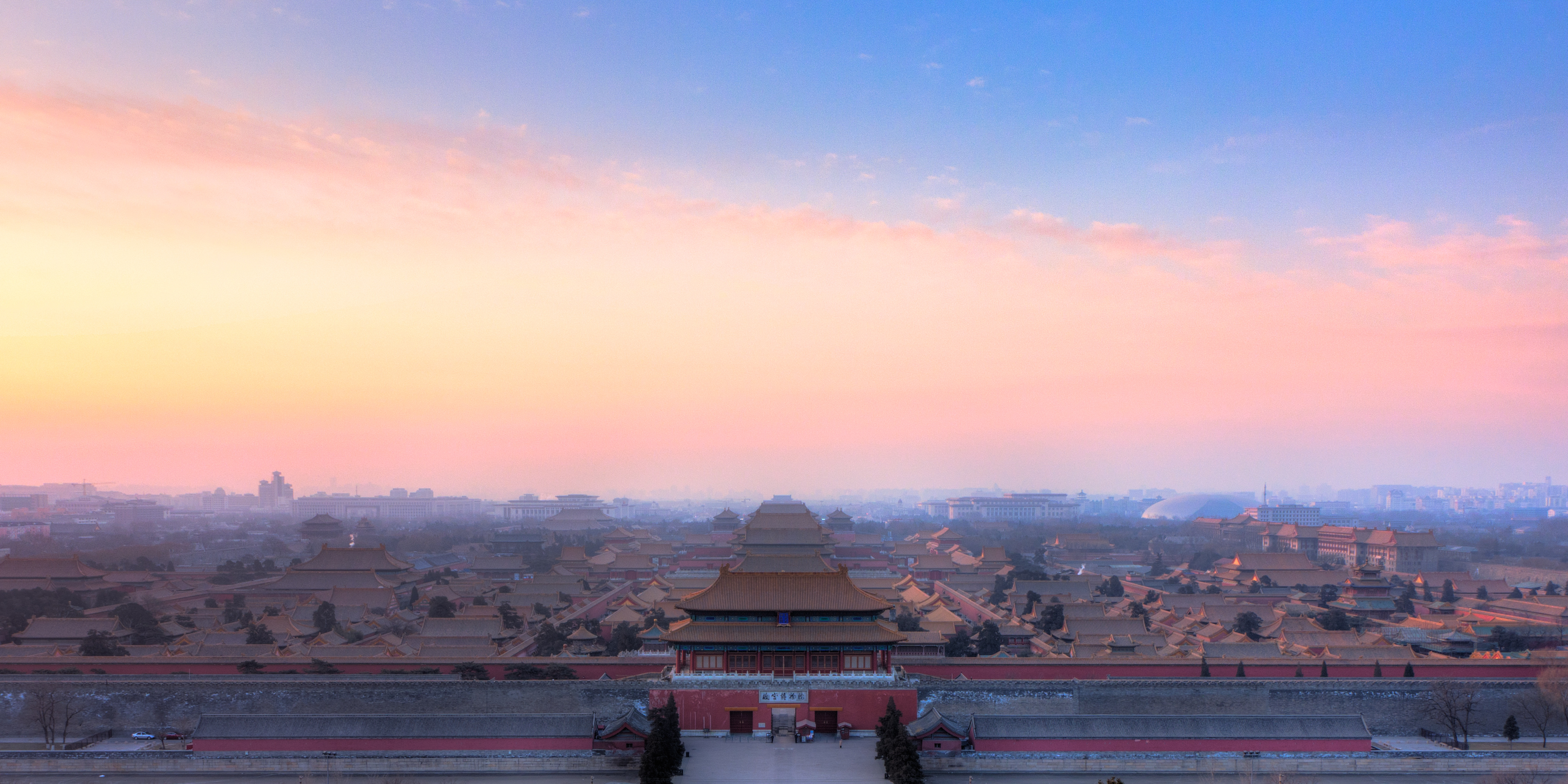
- The Forbidden City viewed from Jingshan Hill

- Location within Beijing Location within China
- Established: 1406 – 1420; 606 years ago 1925; 101 years ago (as public museum)
- Location: 4 Jingshan Front St, Dongcheng District, Beijing, China
- Coordinates: 39°54′57″N 116°23′27″E
- Type: Art museum; imperial palace; historic site
- Visitors: 16.7 million
- Curator: Wang Xudong
- Website: dpm.org.cn (in Chinese) intl.dpm.org.cn (in English)

History
- Built: 1406–1420 (Ming dynasty)

Site notes
- Area: 72 ha (180 acres)
- Architect: Kuai Xiang
- Architectural style: Chinese architecture

Major cultural heritage sites under national-level protection

UNESCO World Heritage Site
- Part of: Imperial Palaces of the Ming and Qing Dynasties in Beijing and Shenyang
- Criteria: Cultural: i, ii, iii, iv
- Reference: 439-001
- Inscription: 1987 (11th Session)

UNESCO World Heritage Site
- Part of: Beijing Central Axis
- Criteria: Cultural: iii, iv
- Reference: 1714
- Inscription: 2024 (46th Session)

The Forbidden City is the imperial palace complex in the center of the Imperial City in Beijing, China. It was the residence of twenty-four Ming and Qing dynasty Emperors and was the center of political power in China from 1420 to 1924. The palace is now administered by the Palace Museum and has been a UNESCO World Heritage Site since 1987. The Forbidden City is one of the most famous palaces in all of Chinese history and is the largest preserved royal palace complex still standing in the world.

The Forbidden City was constructed from 1406 to 1420 and was the imperial palace and winter residence of the Emperor of China from the Ming dynasty (since the Yongle Emperor in 1420) to the end of the Qing dynasty in 1924. Serving as the home of Chinese emperors and their households, the Forbidden City was the ceremonial and political center of the Chinese government for over 500 years. Since 1925, the Forbidden City has been under the charge of the Palace Museum, whose extensive collection of artwork and artifacts was built upon the imperial collections of the Ming and Qing dynasties.

The complex claims to consist of 9,999 rooms in total, although experts have shown in recent years that the number amounts to 8,886, covering 72 ha (720,000 m^{2}; 180 acres). The palace exemplifies the opulence of the residences of the Chinese emperor and the traditional Chinese palatial architecture, and it has influenced cultural and architectural developments in East Asia and beyond. Since 2012, the Forbidden City has seen an average of 14 million visitors annually, even receiving more than 19 million visitors in 2019.

It was included in the first list of national priority protected sites that China produced in 1961, and UNESCO recognizes it as the largest collection of preserved ancient wooden structures in the world. The palace is extremely important to the Chinese public and nation, who often view it as a cultural and heavenly link to their ancestors.

== Etymology ==
The palace gained its name from its enormous scale and severely restricted access to all but the emperor, the imperial family, and their eunuch servants; hence the term "Forbidden City" emerged. The punishment for unauthorised entry to the palace was immediate execution. The common English name "Forbidden City" is a translation of the Chinese name Zijincheng (紫禁城; lit. 'Purple Forbidden City'), which first formally appeared in 1576. Another English name of similar origin is "Forbidden Palace", though "city" is much closer to the original Chinese meaning.

The name "Zijincheng" has significance on many levels. Zi, or "purple", refers to the North Star, which in ancient China was called the Ziwei Star, and in traditional Chinese astrology was the heavenly abode of the Jade Emperor. The surrounding celestial region, the Ziwei Enclosure (紫微垣; Zǐwēiyuán), was the realm of the Jade Emperor and his family. The Forbidden City, as the residence of the terrestrial emperor, was its earthly counterpart. Jin refers to a prohibition or taboo. Cheng originally meant a castle, fortress, or fortification, but in modern Chinese, the character means city.

Today, the site is most commonly known in Chinese as Gugong (故宮), which means the "Former Palace". (Note: "Gùgōng" in a generic sense also refers to all former palaces, another prominent example being the former Imperial Palaces (Mukden Palace) in Shenyang; see Gugong (disambiguation).) The museum that is based in these buildings is known as the "Palace Museum" (故宮博物院; Gùgōng Bówùyùan).

In the Ming and Qing dynasties, the Forbidden City was also known as Danei (大内) or "Palace City" (宮城; Gōngchéng).

== History ==
When the Hongwu Emperor's son Zhu Di became the Yongle Emperor, he moved the capital from Nanjing to Beijing, and construction began in 1406 on what would become the Forbidden City.

Forbidden City
- "Forbidden City" in Chinese characters

Chinese name
- Chinese: 紫禁城
- Literal meaning: "Purple Forbidden City"
Transcriptions
Standard Mandarin
- Hanyu Pinyin: Zǐjìnchéng
- Bopomofo: ㄗˇ ㄐㄧㄣˋ ㄔㄥˊ
- Wade–Giles: Tzu^{3}-chin^{4}-chʻeng^{2}
- Tongyong Pinyin: Zǐh-jìn-chéng
- IPA: [tsɹ̩̀.tɕîn.ʈʂʰə̌ŋ]
other Mandarin
- Xiao'erjing: زِجىنْچېڭ
Yue: Cantonese
- Yale Romanization: Jí-gam-sìhng
- Jyutping: Zi2-gam3-sing4
- IPA: [tsi˧˥.kɐm˧.sɪŋ˩]
Southern Min
- Hokkien POJ: Chí-kìm-siâⁿ
- Tâi-lô: Tsí-kìm-siânn

Vietnamese name
- Vietnamese: Tử Cấm Thành
- Chữ Hán: 紫禁城

Manchu name
- Manchu script: ᡩᠠᠪᡴᡡᡵᡳ ᡩᠣᡵᡤᡳ ᡥᠣᡨᠣᠨ
- Romanization: dabkūri dorgi hoton "Former Inner City"

Construction lasted 14 years and required more than a million workers. Material used included whole logs of precious Phoebe zhennan wood (楠木; nánmù) found in the jungles of southwestern China, and large blocks of marble from quarries near Beijing. The floors of major halls were paved with "golden bricks" (金磚; jīnzhuān), specially baked paving bricks from Suzhou.

From 1420 to 1644, the Forbidden City was the seat of the Ming dynasty. In April 1644, it was captured by rebel forces led by Li Zicheng, who proclaimed himself emperor of the Shun dynasty. He soon fled before the combined armies of former Ming general Wu Sangui and Manchu forces, setting fire to parts of the Forbidden City in the process.

By October, the Manchus had achieved supremacy in northern China, and a ceremony was held at the Forbidden City to proclaim the young Shunzhi Emperor as ruler of all China under the Qing dynasty. The Qing rulers changed the names on some of the principal buildings to emphasise "harmony" rather than "supremacy", made the nameplates bilingual (Chinese and Manchu), and introduced shamanist elements to the palace.

In 1860, during the Second Opium War, Anglo-French forces took control of the Forbidden City and occupied it until the end of the war. In 1900, Empress Dowager Cixi fled from the Forbidden City during the Boxer Rebellion, leaving it to be occupied by forces of the treaty powers until the following year.

After being the home of 24 emperors – 14 of the Ming dynasty and 10 of the Qing dynasty – the Forbidden City ceased being the political centre of China in 1912 with the abdication of Puyi, the last Emperor of China. Under an agreement with the new Republic of China government, Puyi remained in the Inner Court, while the Outer Court was given over to public use, until he was evicted after a coup in 1924. The Palace Museum was then established in the Forbidden City in 1925.

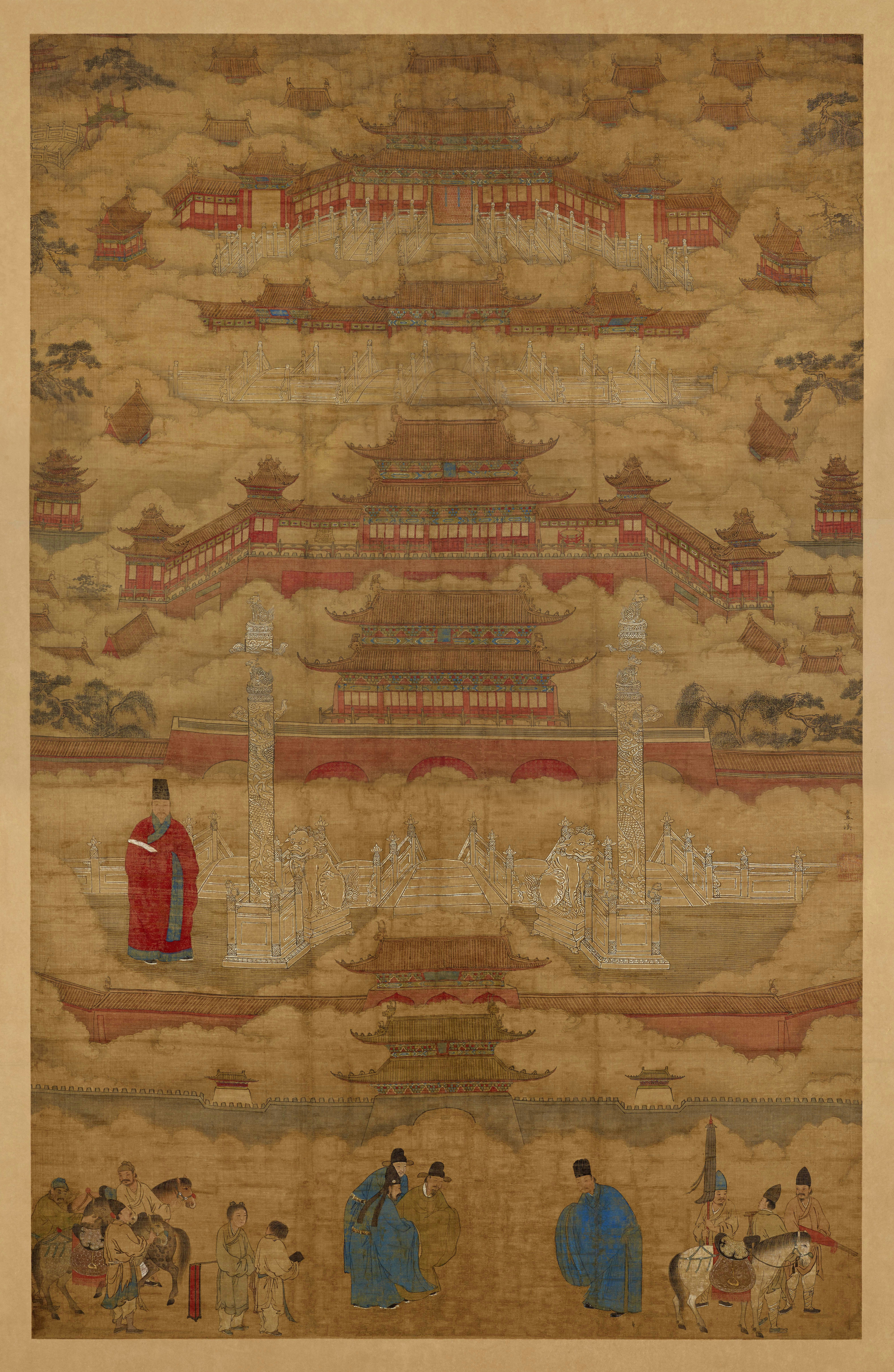
The Forbidden City as depicted in a Ming dynasty painting

In 1933, the Japanese invasion of China forced the evacuation of the national treasures in the Forbidden City. Part of the collection returned at the end of World War II, but the other part was evacuated to Taiwan in 1948 under orders of Chiang Kai-shek, whose ruling political party Kuomintang was losing the Chinese Civil War. This relatively small but high quality collection was kept in storage until 1965, when it again became public as the core of the National Palace Museum in Taipei.

After the establishment of the People's Republic of China in 1949, some damage was done to the Forbidden City as the country was swept up in revolutionary zeal. There were multiple plans to demolish the palace complex and reutilize the site; one plan even involved making it the seat of the new Communist government. During the Cultural Revolution, further destruction was prevented when Premier Zhou Enlai sent an army battalion to guard the city.

In 1987, the Forbidden City was declared a World Heritage Site by UNESCO as the "Imperial Palace of the Ming and Qing Dynasties", due to its significant place in the development of Chinese architecture and culture.

In the early 21st century, the Palace Museum carried out a sixteen-year restoration project to repair and restore all buildings in the Forbidden City to their pre-1911 state, with the goal that 76% of the palace would be open to the public by 2020. As a result of that project, the Shoukang Palace was officially opened to the public in 2013, after initially being displayed in its original state. A sculpture museum was opened in the Cining Palace in 2015. Also opened in 2015 were the precincts around Cining Palace, the Yanyin Building and the Donghua Gate.

5 November 2024 marked the 100-year anniversary since the expulsion of the last Emperor of China, Puyi, from the palace by the republican forces led by Feng Yuxiang.

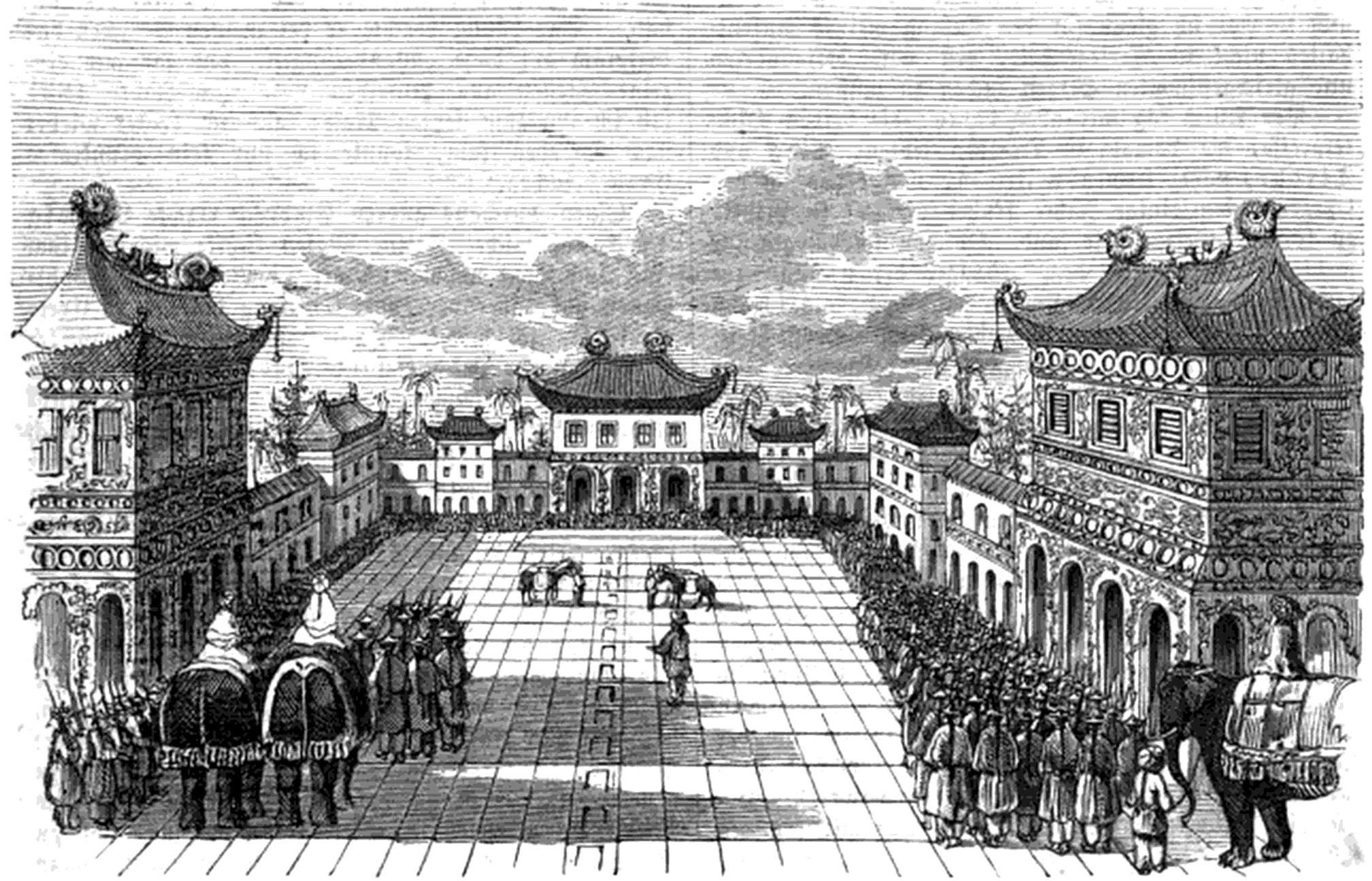
A depiction of the Forbidden City from the German magazine Die Gartenlaube (1853)

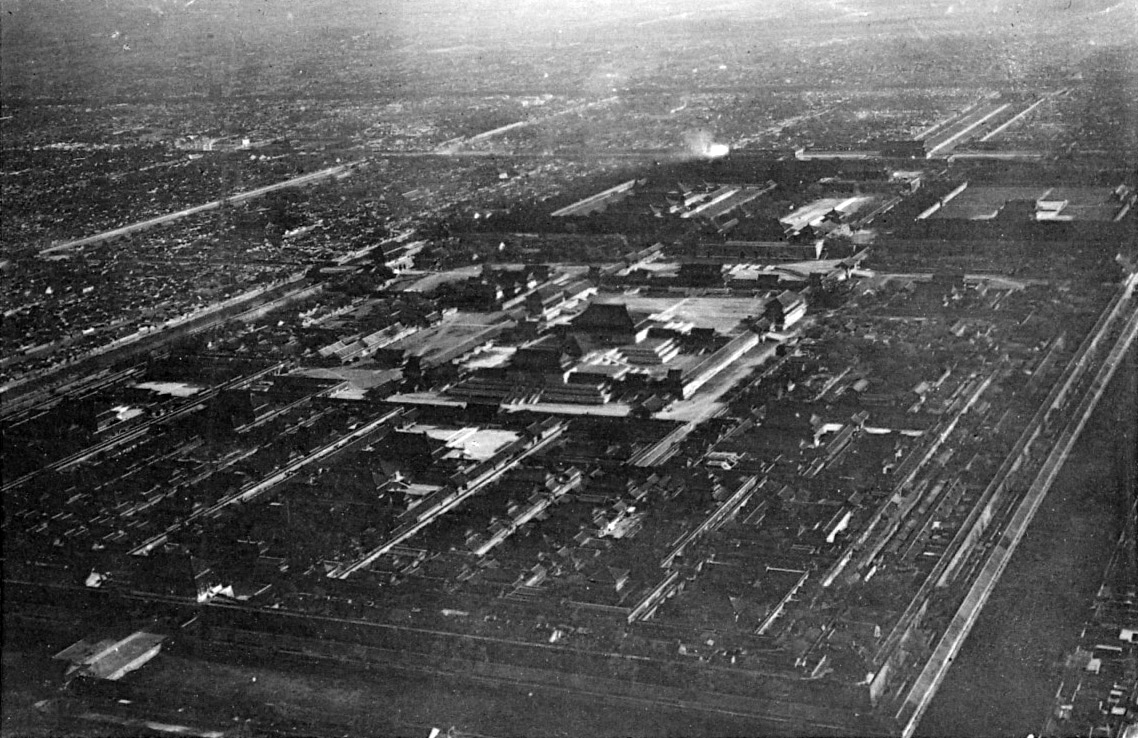
Aerial view of the Forbidden City (1900 or 1901)

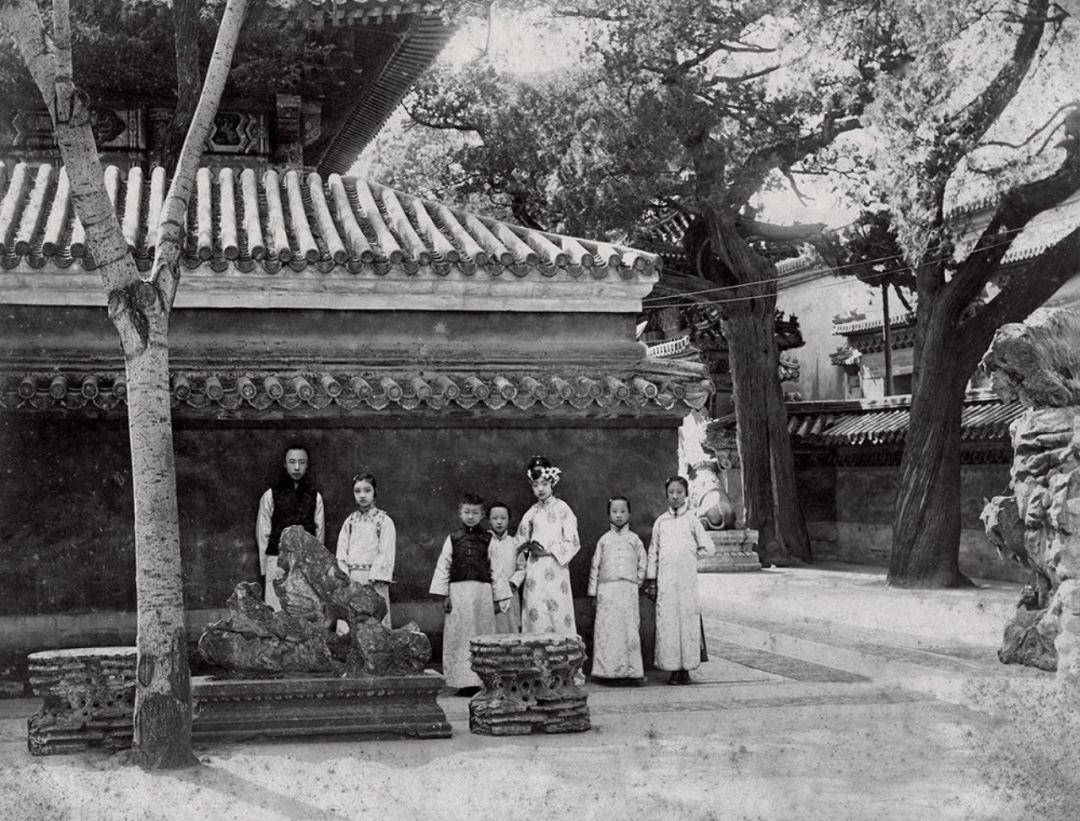
Puyi, Runqi and Wanrong in the Forbidden City, c. 1922–1924

== Structure ==
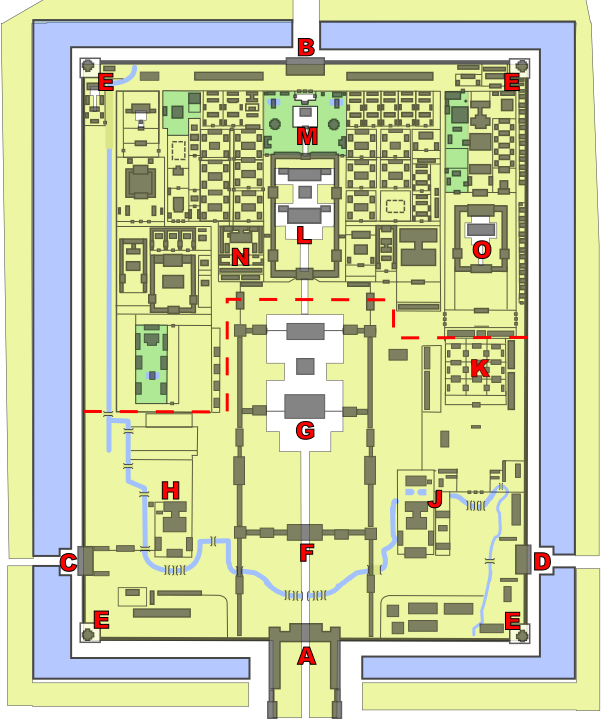
Plan of the Forbidden City. Labels in red are used to refer to locations throughout the article.: – - Approximate dividing line between Inner (north) and Outer (south) Courts.; A. Meridian Gate; B. Gate of Divine Might; C. West Glorious Gate; D. East Glorious Gate; E. Corner towers F. Gate of Supreme Harmony; G. Hall of Supreme Harmony / H. Hall of Military Eminence; J. Hall of Literary Glory; K. Southern Three Places; L. Palace of Heavenly Purity; M. Imperial Garden; N. Hall of Mental Cultivation; O. Palace of Tranquil Longevity

The Forbidden City is a rectangle, measuring 961 m (3,153 ft) from north to south and 753 m (2,470 ft) from east to west. It consists of 980 surviving buildings with 8,886 bays of rooms. (Note: As larger buildings in traditional Chinese architecture are easily and regularly sub-divided into different configurations, the number of rooms in the Forbidden City is traditionally counted in terms of "bays" of rooms, with each bay being the space defined by four structural pillars.) A common myth states that there are 9,999 rooms including antechambers, based on oral tradition, but it is not supported by survey evidence.

The layout of the Forbidden City protected the imperial code of ethics as a physical installation. The courtyard was built on a massive, luxurious scale but it has the appearance of a quadrangle courtyard. The Forbidden City was designed to be the centre of the ancient, walled city of Beijing. It is enclosed in a larger, walled area called the Imperial City. The Imperial City is, in turn, enclosed by the Inner City; to its south lies the Outer City.

The Forbidden City remains important in the civic scheme of Beijing. The central north–south axis remains the central axis of Beijing. This axis extends to the south through Tiananmen Gate to Tiananmen Square, the ceremonial centre of the People's Republic of China, and on to Yongdingmen Gate. To the north, it extends through Jingshan Park to the Drum Tower and Bell Tower. This axis is not exactly aligned north–south, but is tilted by slightly more than two degrees. Researchers now believe that the axis was designed during the Yuan dynasty to be aligned with Shangdu, the other capital of their empire.

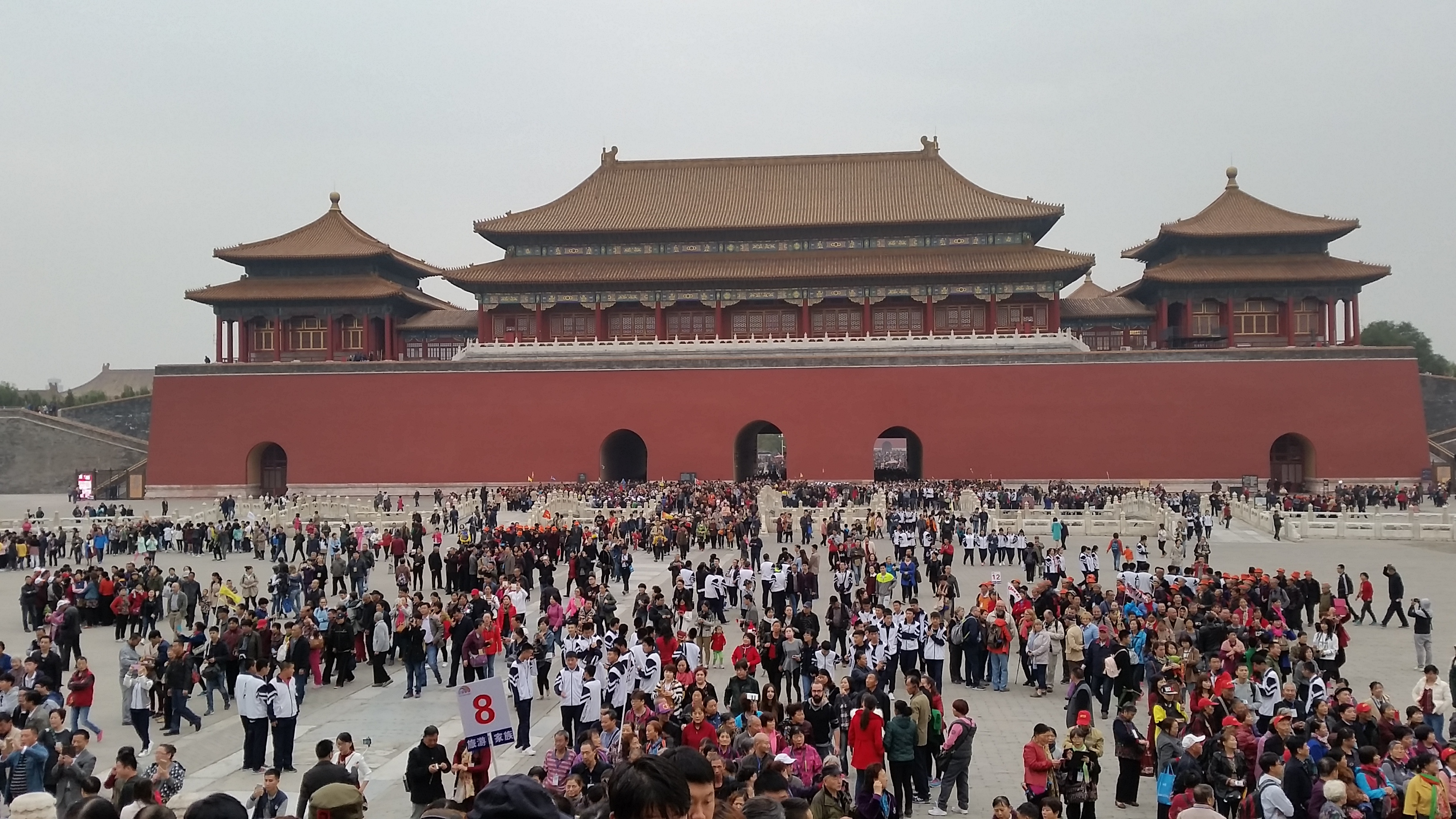
The Meridian Gate seen from the inner courtyard

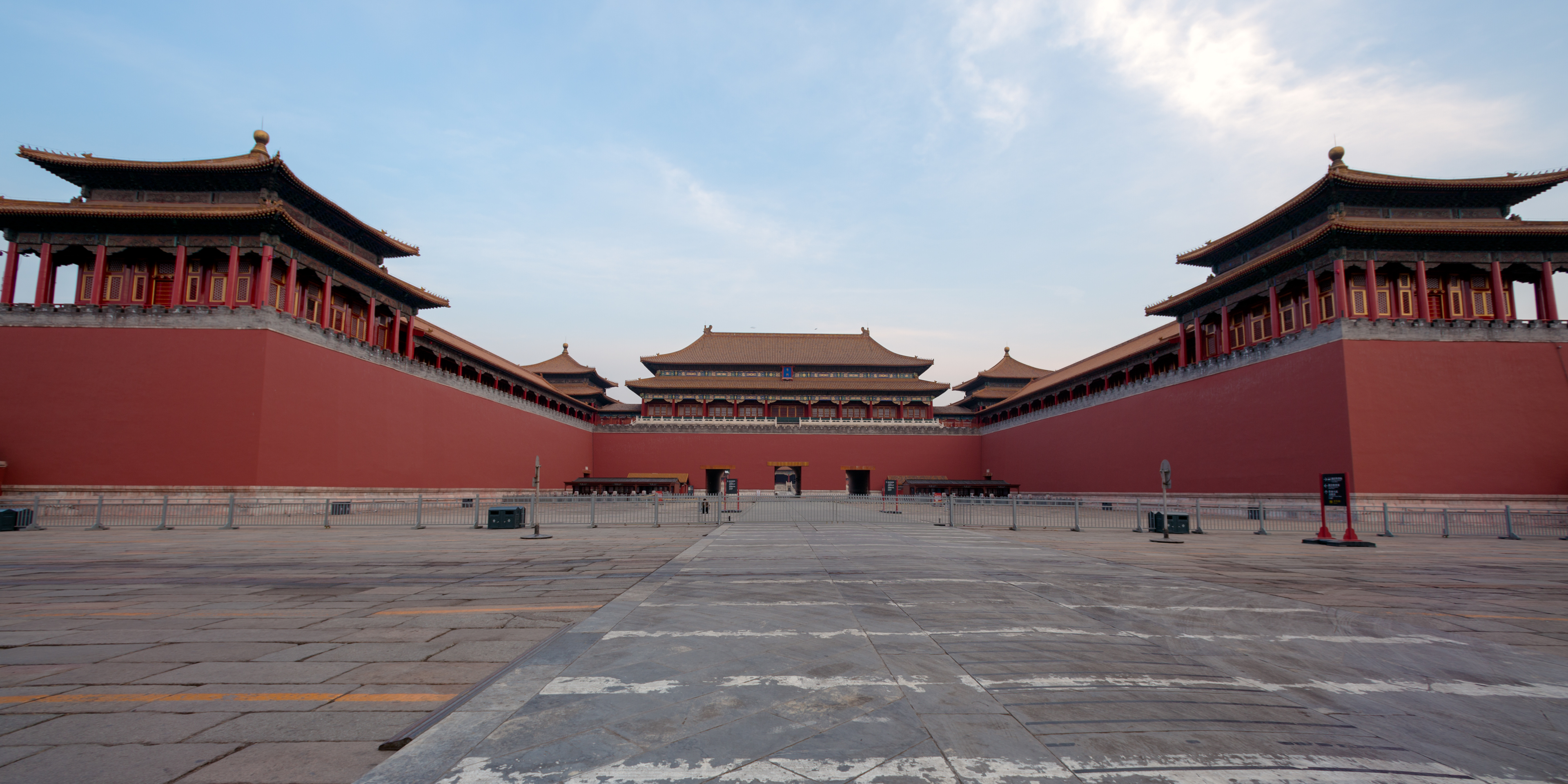
The Meridian Gate, front entrance of the Forbidden City, with two protruding wings

=== Walls and gates ===
The Forbidden City is surrounded by a 7.9 m (26 ft) high city wall and a 6 m (20 ft) deep by 52 m (171 ft) wide moat. The walls are 8.62 m (28.3 ft) wide at the base, tapering to 6.66 m (21.9 ft) at the top. These walls served as both defensive walls and retaining walls for the palace. They were constructed with a rammed earth core, and surfaced with three layers of specially baked bricks on both sides, with the interstices filled with mortar.

At the four corners of the wall (fortifications dating to the 15th and 18th centuries) sit corner towers (E) with intricate roofs boasting 72 ridges, reproducing the Pavilion of Prince Teng and the Yellow Crane Pavilion as they appeared in Song dynasty paintings. These towers are the most visible parts of the palace to people outside the walls, and much folklore is attached to them. According to one legend, artisans could not put a corner tower back together after it was dismantled for renovations in the early Qing dynasty, and it was only rebuilt after the intervention of master carpenter Lu Ban.

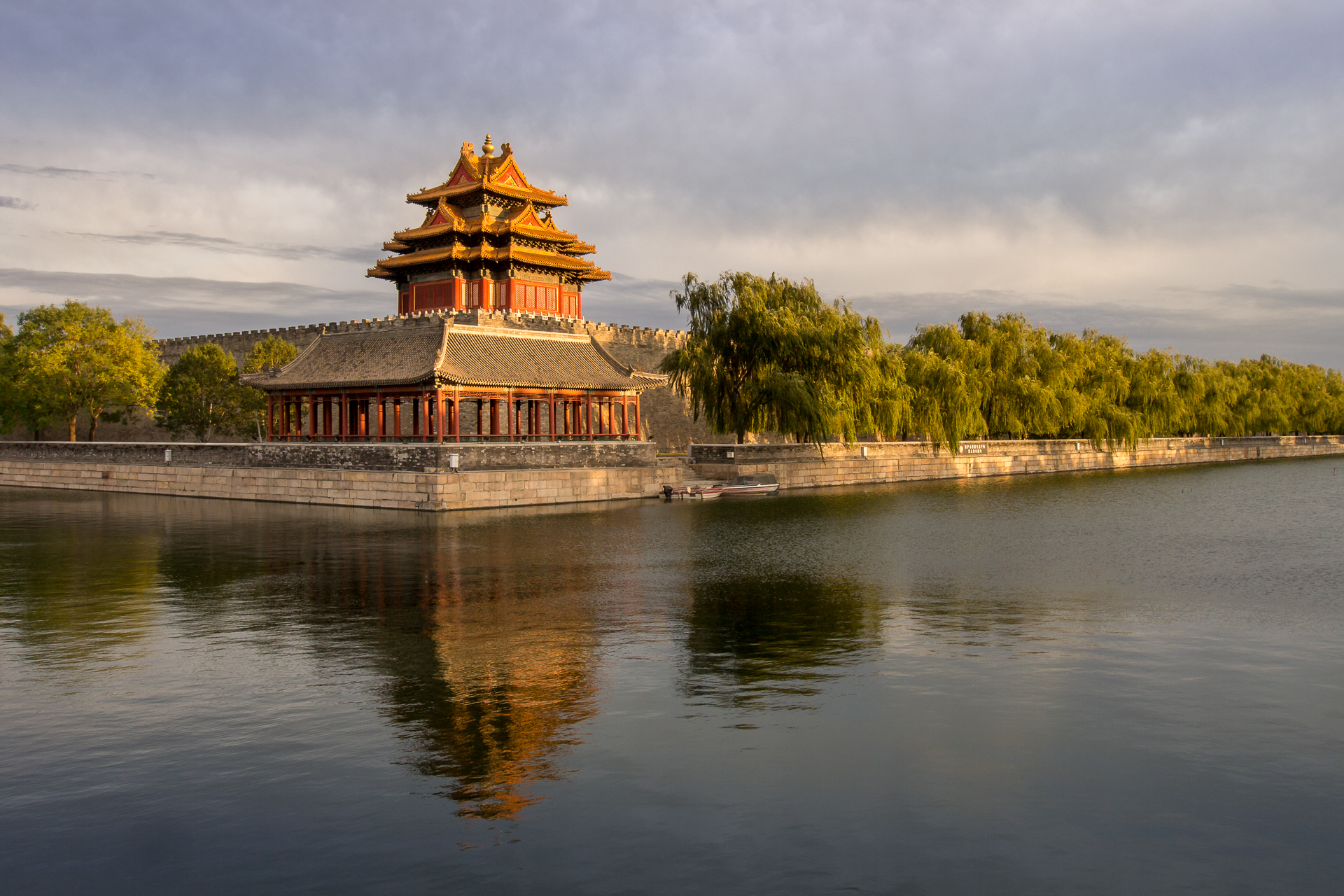
A corner tower in the northwest side and the moat

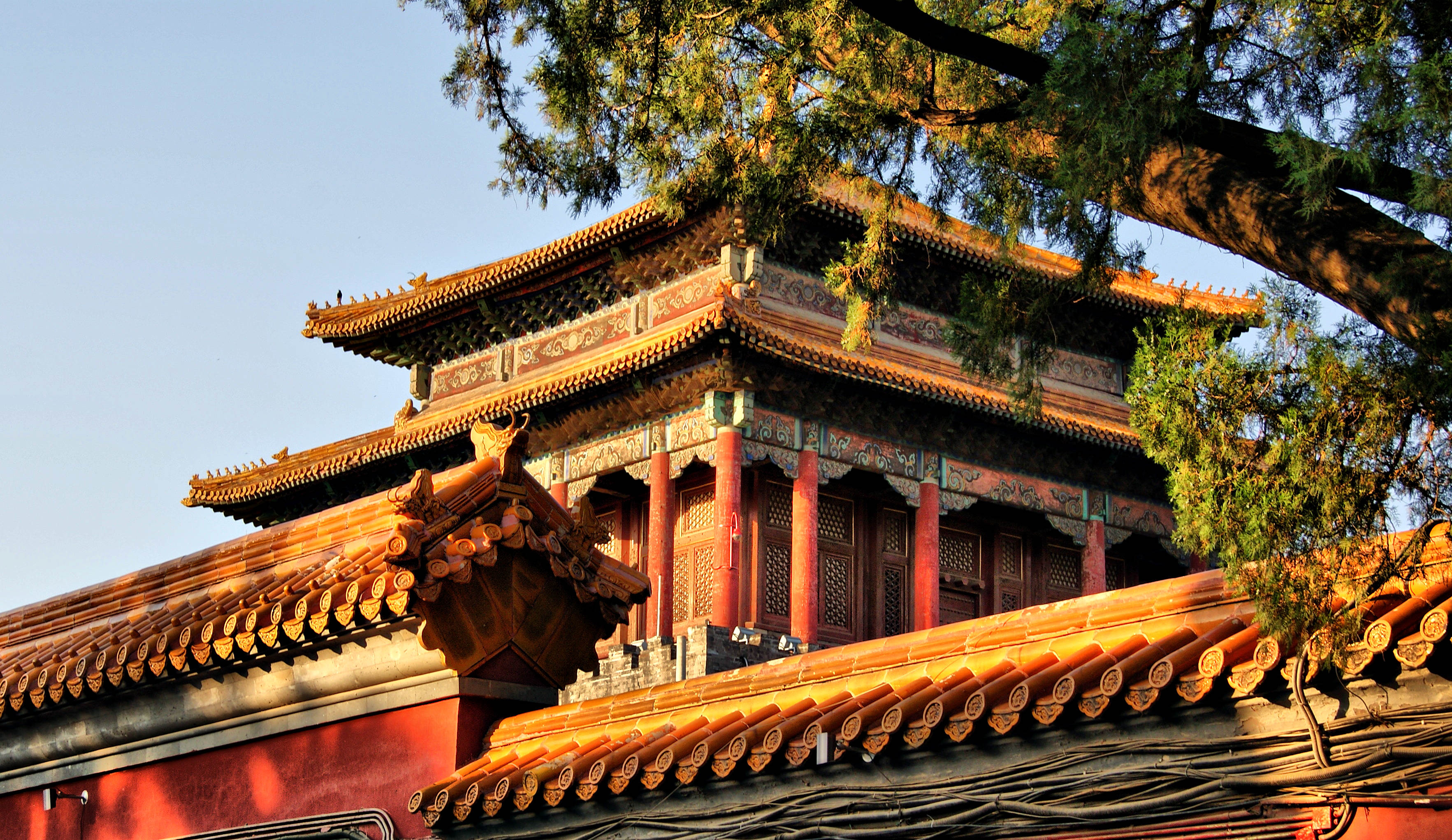
Close-up on the left protruding wing of the Meridian Gate

The wall is pierced by a gate on each side. At the southern end is the main Meridian Gate (A) (午門; Wǔmén). (Note: Technically, Tiananmen Gate is not part of the Forbidden City; it is a gate of the Imperial City.) To the north is the Gate of Divine Prowess (B) (神武門; Shénwǔmén), which faces Jingshan Park. The east and west gates are the East Glorious Gate (D) (東華門; Dōnghuámén) and the West Glorious Gate (C) (西華門; Xīhuámén). All gates in the Forbidden City are decorated with nine-by-nine arrays of golden door nails, except for the East Glorious Gate, which has only eight.

The Meridian Gate has two protruding wings, which form three sides of a square before it, and five gateways. The central gateway is part of the Imperial Way, a stone flagged path that forms the central axis of the Forbidden City and the ancient city of Beijing itself, leading all the way from the Gate of China in the south to Jingshan Park in the north. Except for the empress on the occasion of her wedding and successful students after the Imperial examination, only the emperor could walk or ride on the Imperial Way.

=== Outer Court or the Southern Section ===
Traditionally, the Forbidden City is divided into two parts: the Outer Court (外朝; Wàicháo) or Front Court (前朝; Qiáncháo) to the south, which was used for ceremonial purposes and the Inner Court (内廷; Nèitíng) or Back Palace (后宫; Hòugōng) to the north, which was the residence of the emperor and his family and was used for day-to-day affairs of state (the approximate dividing line shown as a red dash in the plan above). Generally, the Forbidden City has three vertical axes. The most important buildings are situated on the central north–south axis.

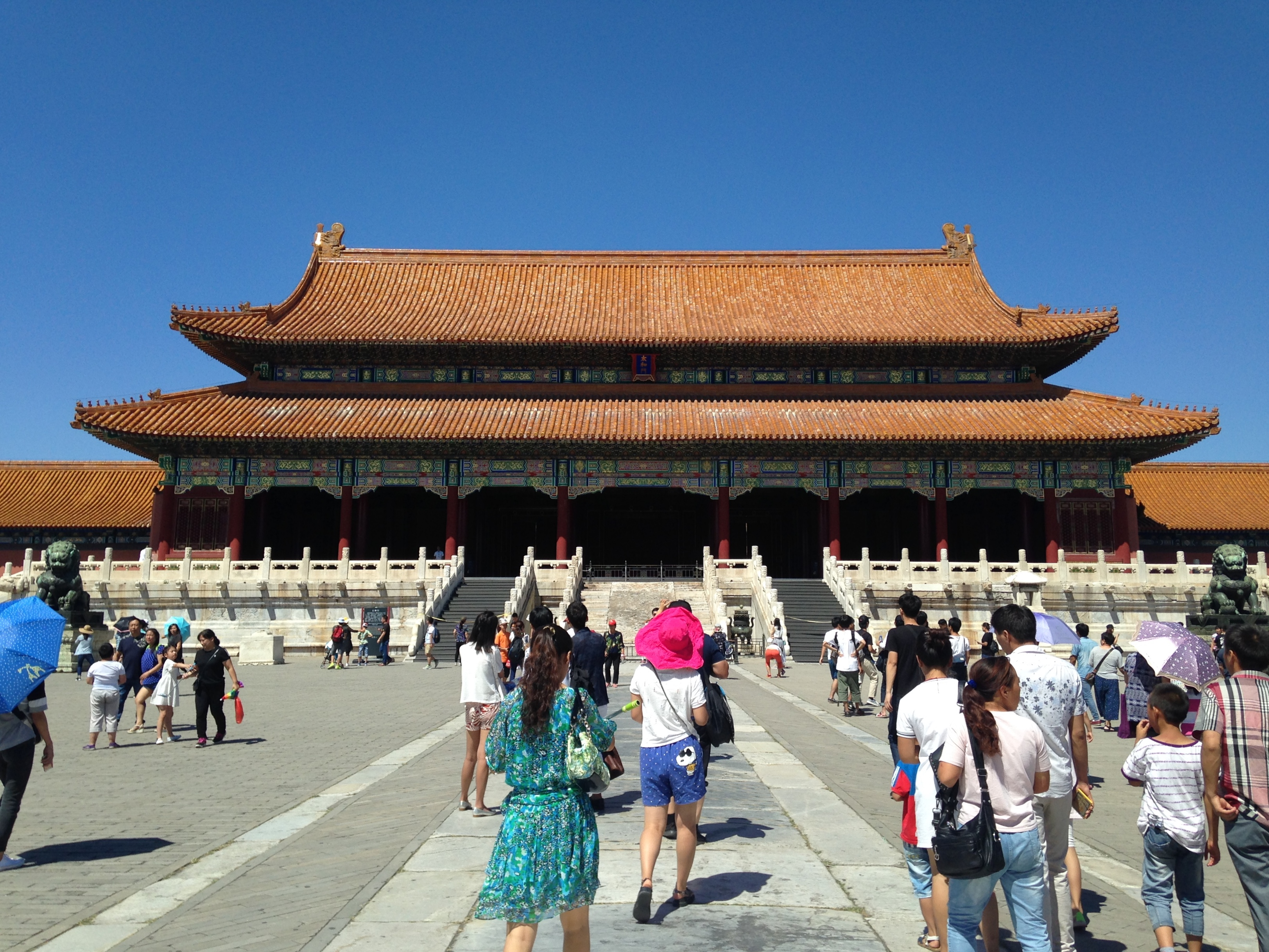
Gate of Supreme Harmony

The Meridian Gate leads to a large square that is by the meandering Inner Golden Water River, which is crossed by five bridges. The bridges include sculpted balustrades that resemble clouds to evoke the "celestial lineage of the emperor." Beyond the square stands the Gate of Supreme Harmony (F) (太和門; Tàihémén). Behind that is a square from which a three-tiered white marble terrace rises: three halls stand on top of this terrace, the focus of the palace complex. From the south, these are the Hall of Supreme Harmony (太和殿; Tàihédiàn), the Hall of Central Harmony (中和殿; Zhōnghédiàn), and the Hall of Preserving Harmony (保和殿; Bǎohédiàn).

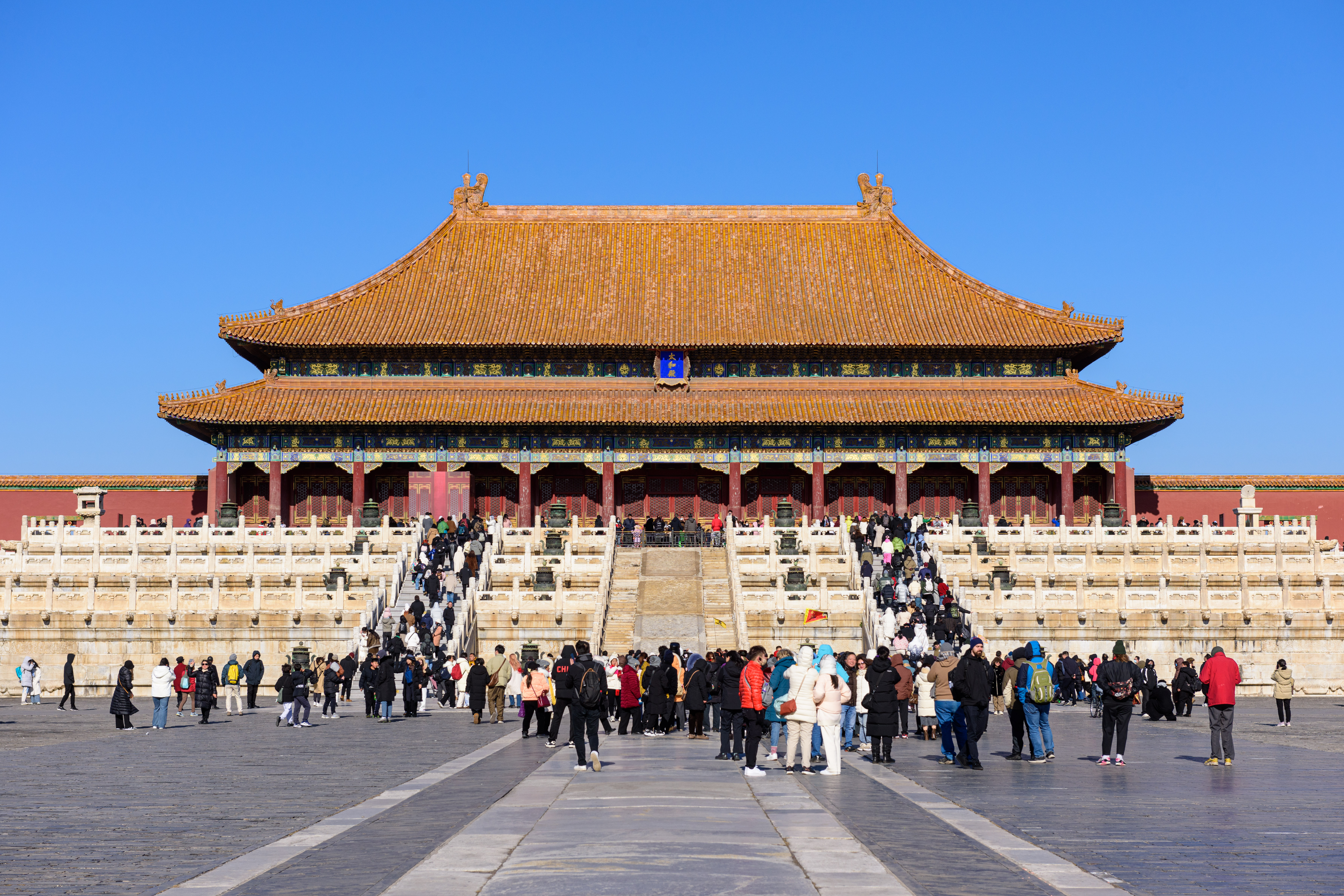
Hall of Supreme Harmony

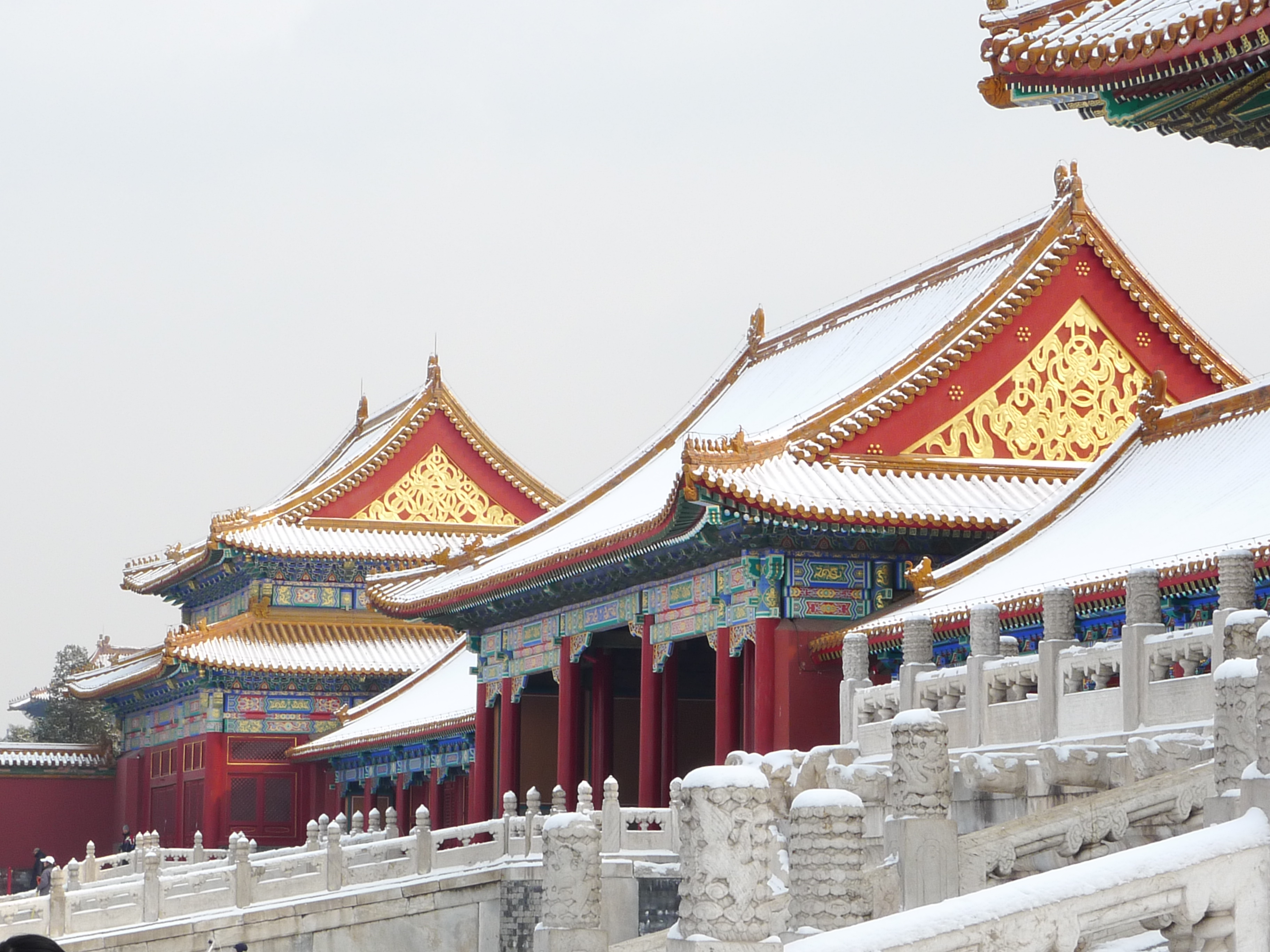
Gate of Manifest Virtue.

The Hall of Supreme Harmony (G) is the largest, and rises some 30 m (98 ft) above the level of the surrounding square. It is the ceremonial centre of imperial power, and the largest surviving wooden structure in China. It is nine bays wide and five bays deep, with the numbers 9 and 5 being symbolically connected to the majesty of the emperor. Set into the ceiling at the centre of the hall is an intricate caisson decorated with a coiled dragon: a chandelier-like set of metal balls comes from its mouth, which is called the "Xuanyuan Mirror".

In the Ming dynasty, the emperor held court in the Hall of Supreme Harmony to discuss affairs of state. During the Qing dynasty, emperors held court far more frequently, so a less ceremonious location was used instead, and the Hall of Supreme Harmony was only used for ceremonial purposes, such as enthronements, investitures, and imperial weddings.

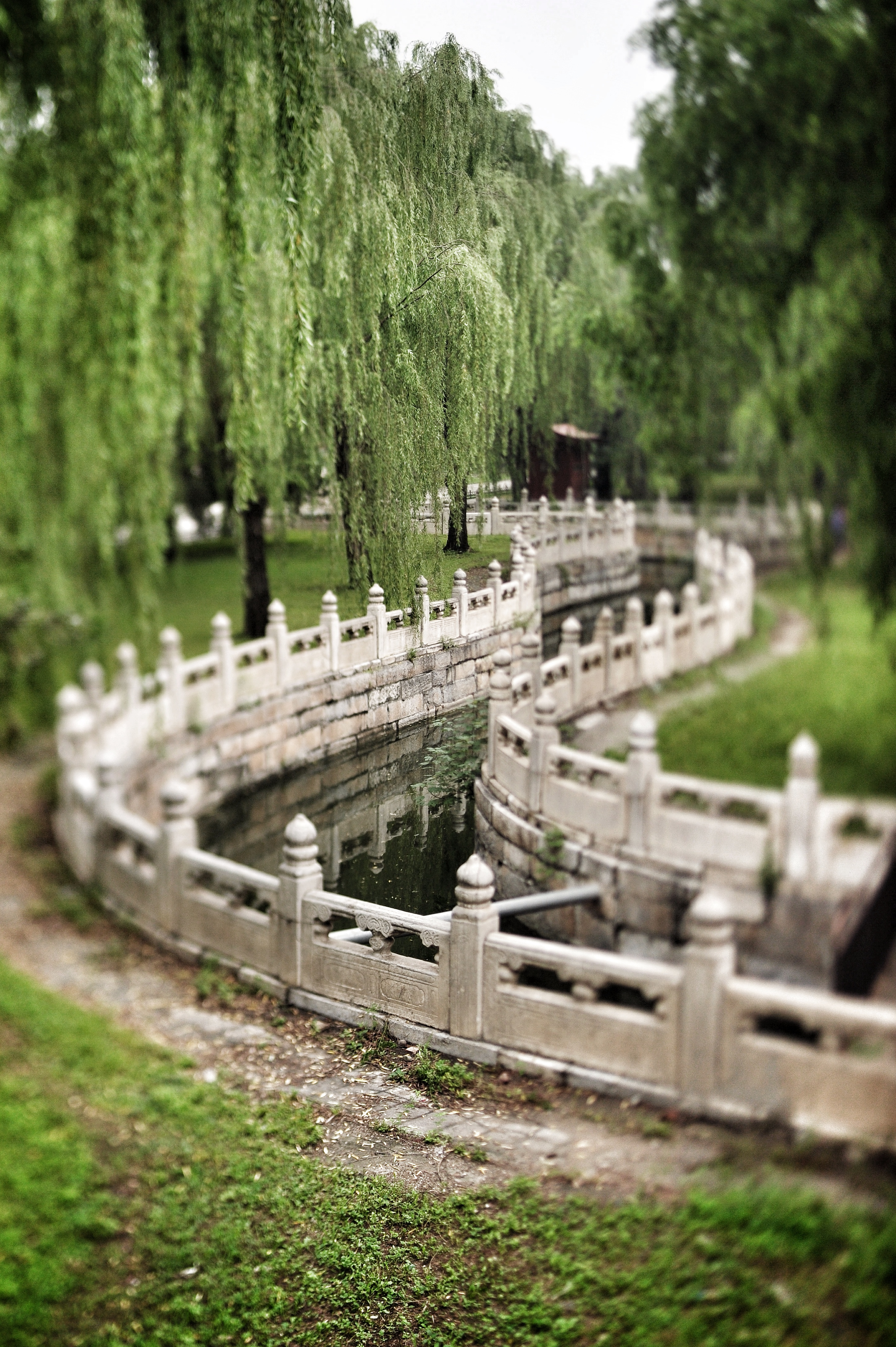
The Inner Golden Water River, an artificial stream that runs through the Forbidden City.

The Hall of Central Harmony is a smaller, square hall, used by the emperor to prepare and rest before and during ceremonies. Behind it, the Hall of Preserving Harmony, was used for rehearsing ceremonies and was also the site of the final stage of the Imperial examinations. All three halls feature imperial thrones, with the largest and most elaborate one being in the Hall of Supreme Harmony.

At the centre of the stairs leading up to the terraces from the northern and southern sides are ceremonial ramps, part of the Imperial Way, featuring elaborate and symbolic bas-relief carvings. The northern ramp, behind the Hall of Preserving Harmony, is carved from a single piece of stone 16.57 m (54.4 ft) long, 3.07 m (10.1 ft) wide, and 1.7 m (5.6 ft) thick. It weighs some 200 tons and is the largest such carving in China. The southern ramp, in front of the Hall of Supreme Harmony, is even longer, but is made from two stone slabs joined – the joint was ingeniously hidden using overlapping bas-relief carvings and was only discovered when weathering widened the gap in the 20th century. The stone slabs were likely transported from a quarry via ice sledge along an ice path lubricated by well water en route.

In the southwest and southeast of the Outer Court are the halls of Military Eminence (H) and Literary Glory (J). The former was used at various times for the emperor to receive ministers and hold court, and later housed the palace's own printing house. The latter was used for ceremonial lectures by highly regarded Confucian scholars, and later became the office of the Grand Secretariat. A copy of the Complete Library of the Four Treasuries was stored there. To the north-east are the Southern Three Places (南三所) (K), which was the residence of the crown prince.

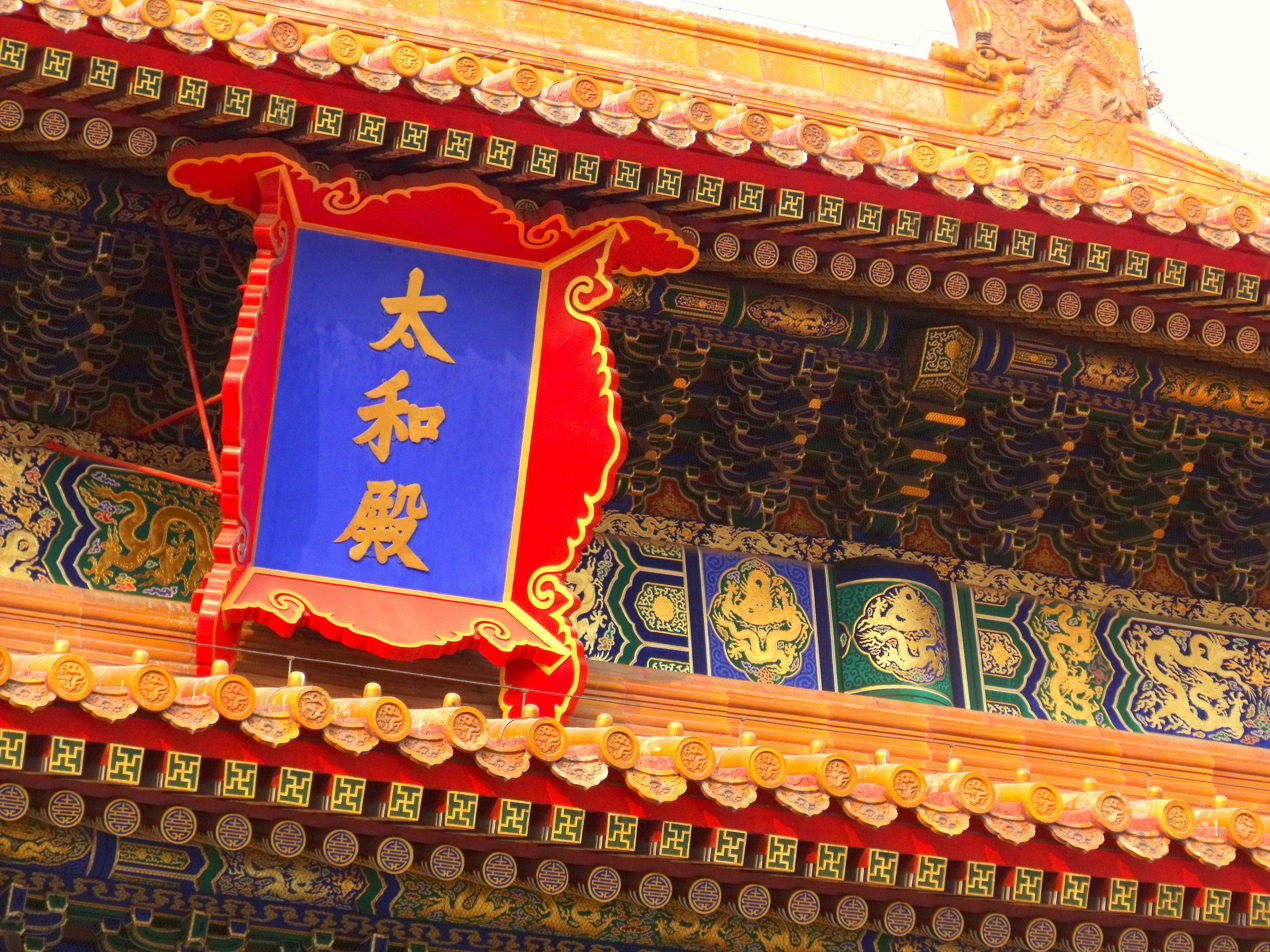
Hall of Supreme Harmony plaque.

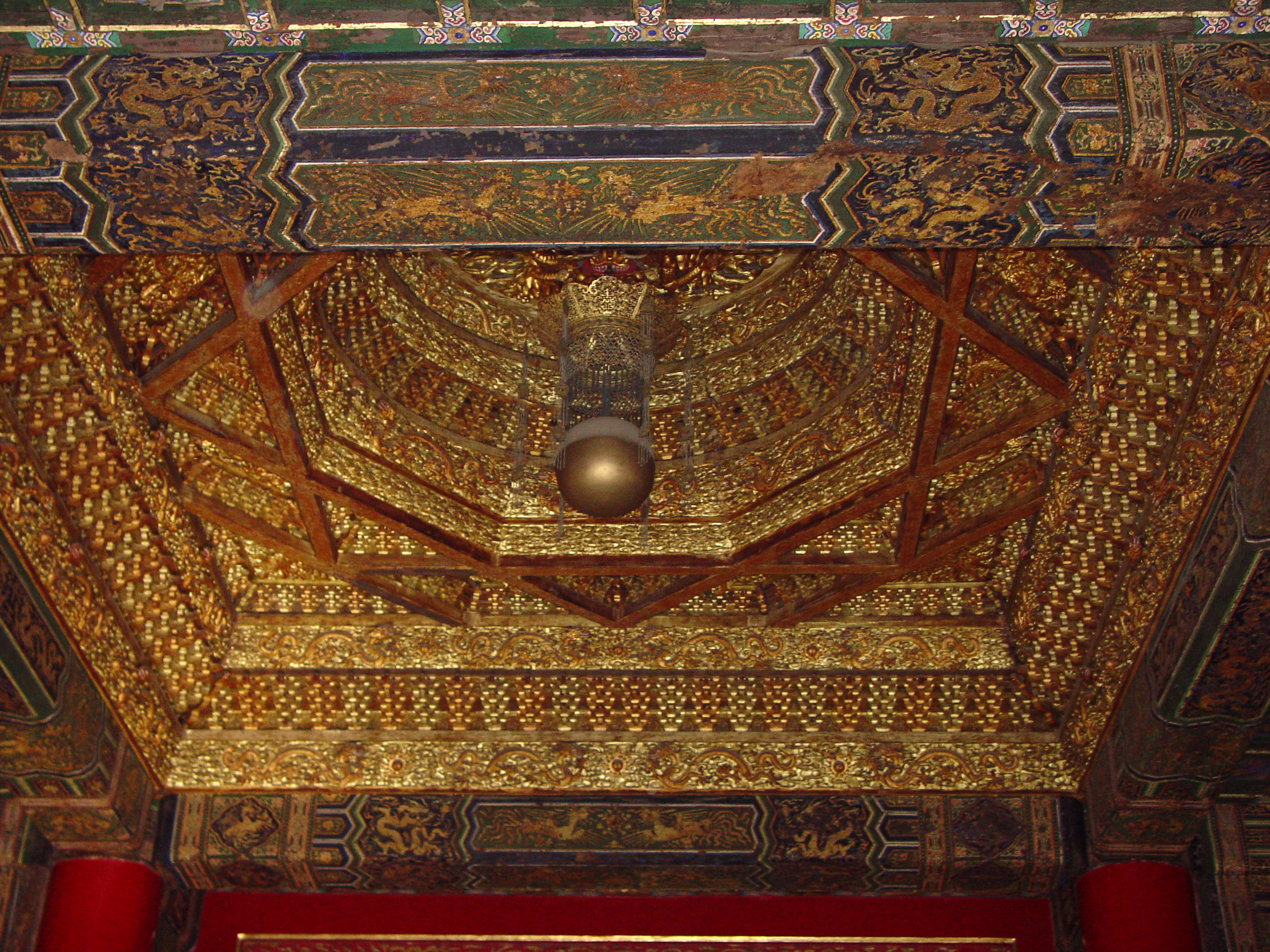
The caisson of the Hall of Union

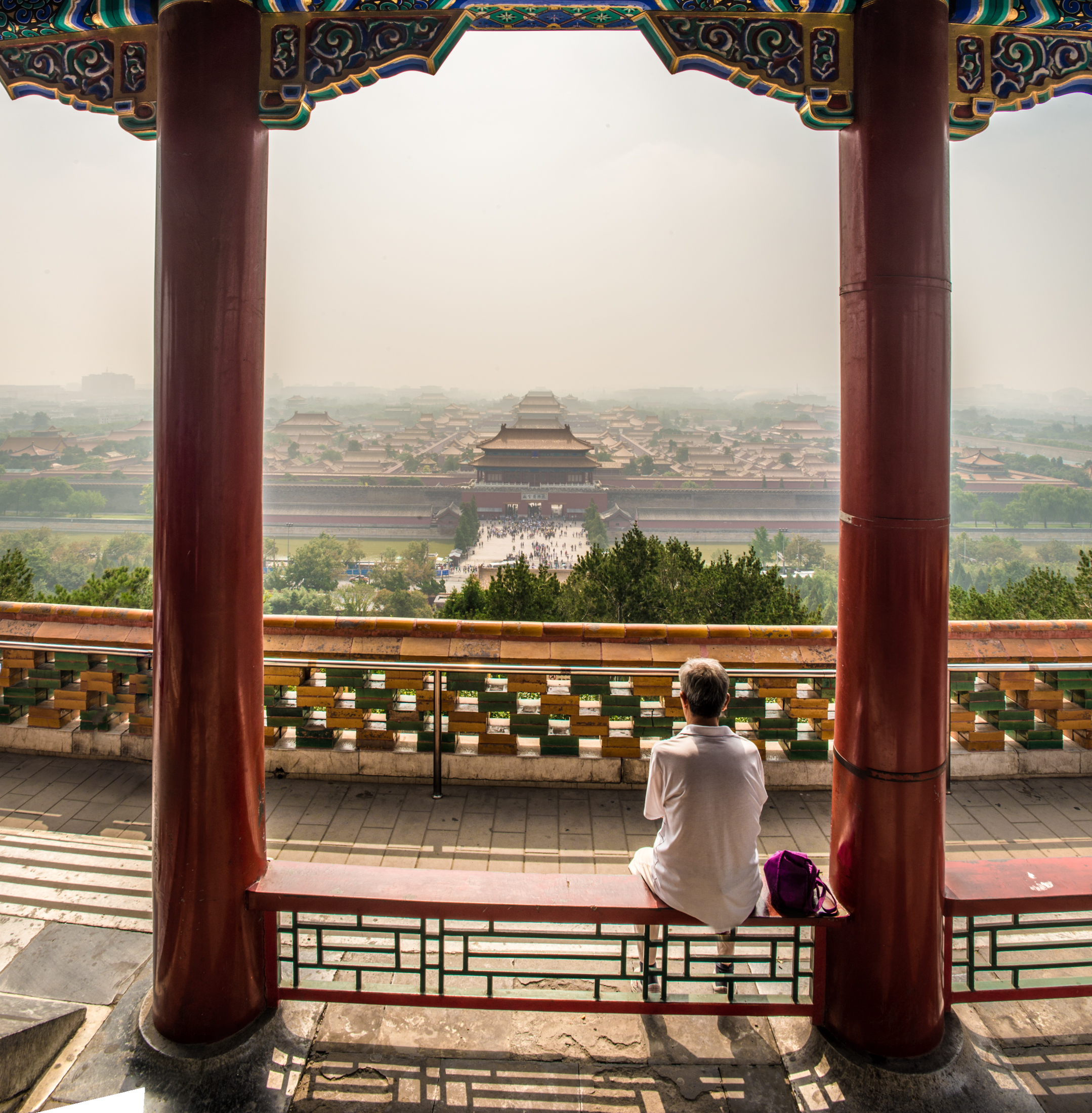
As viewed from Jingshan Park.

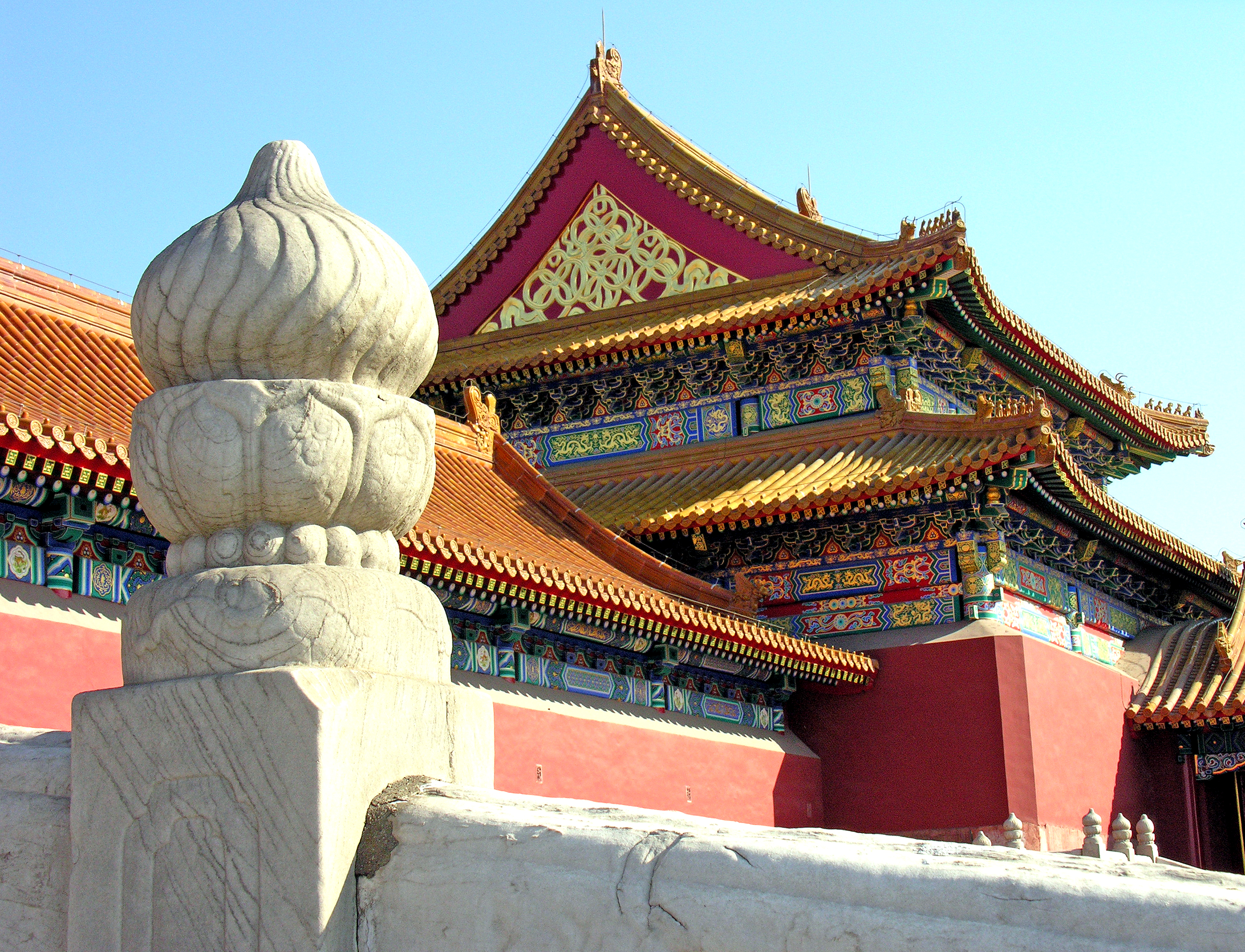
Detail view of the tower to the right of the Gate of Supreme Harmony

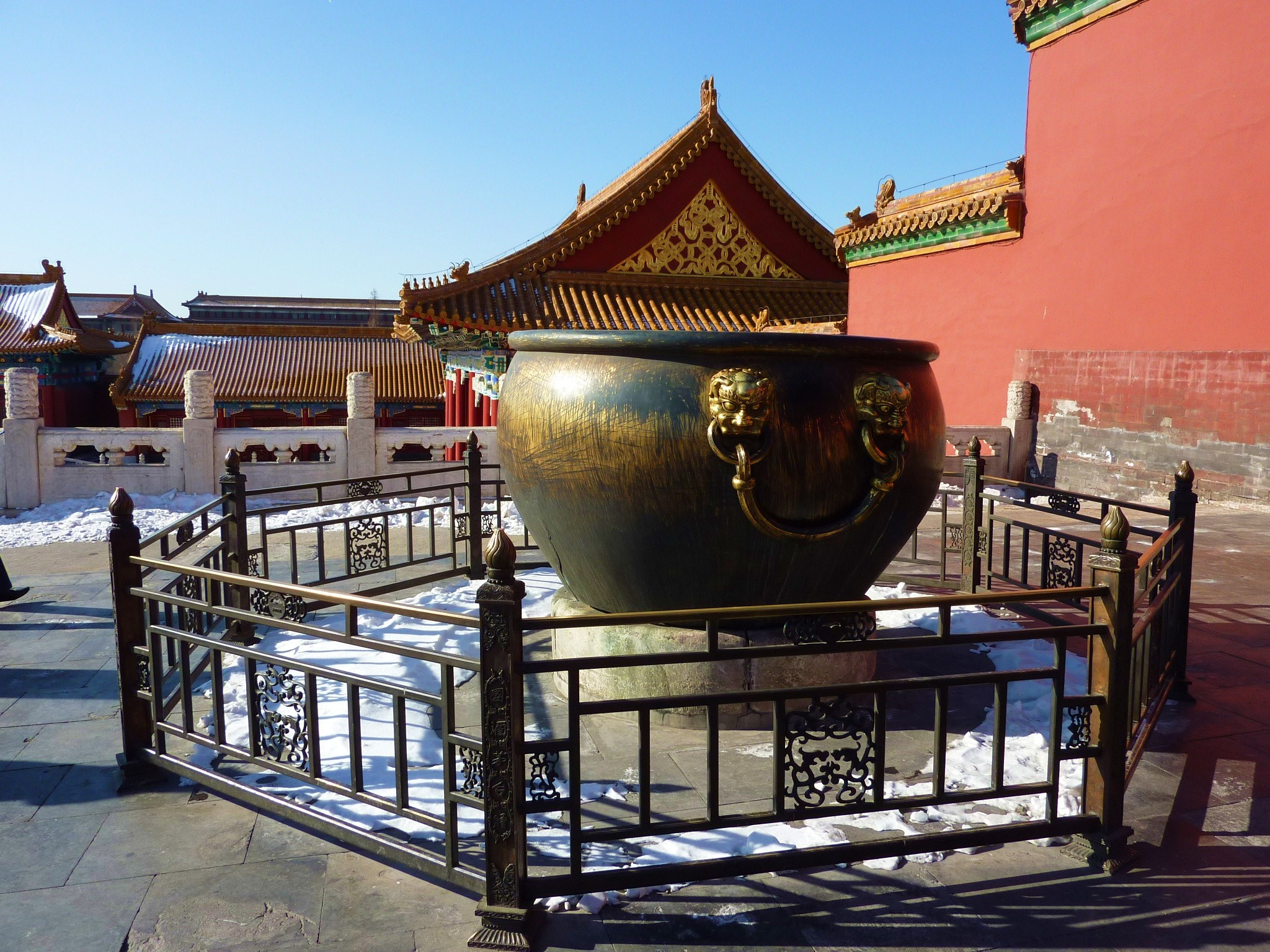
A cistern in front of the Hall of Supreme Harmony

=== Inner Court or the Northern Section ===
The Inner Court is separated from the Outer Court by an oblong courtyard lying orthogonal to the city's main axis. It was the home of the Emperor and his family. In the Qing dynasty, the Emperor lived and worked almost exclusively in the Inner Court, with the Outer Court used only for ceremonial purposes.

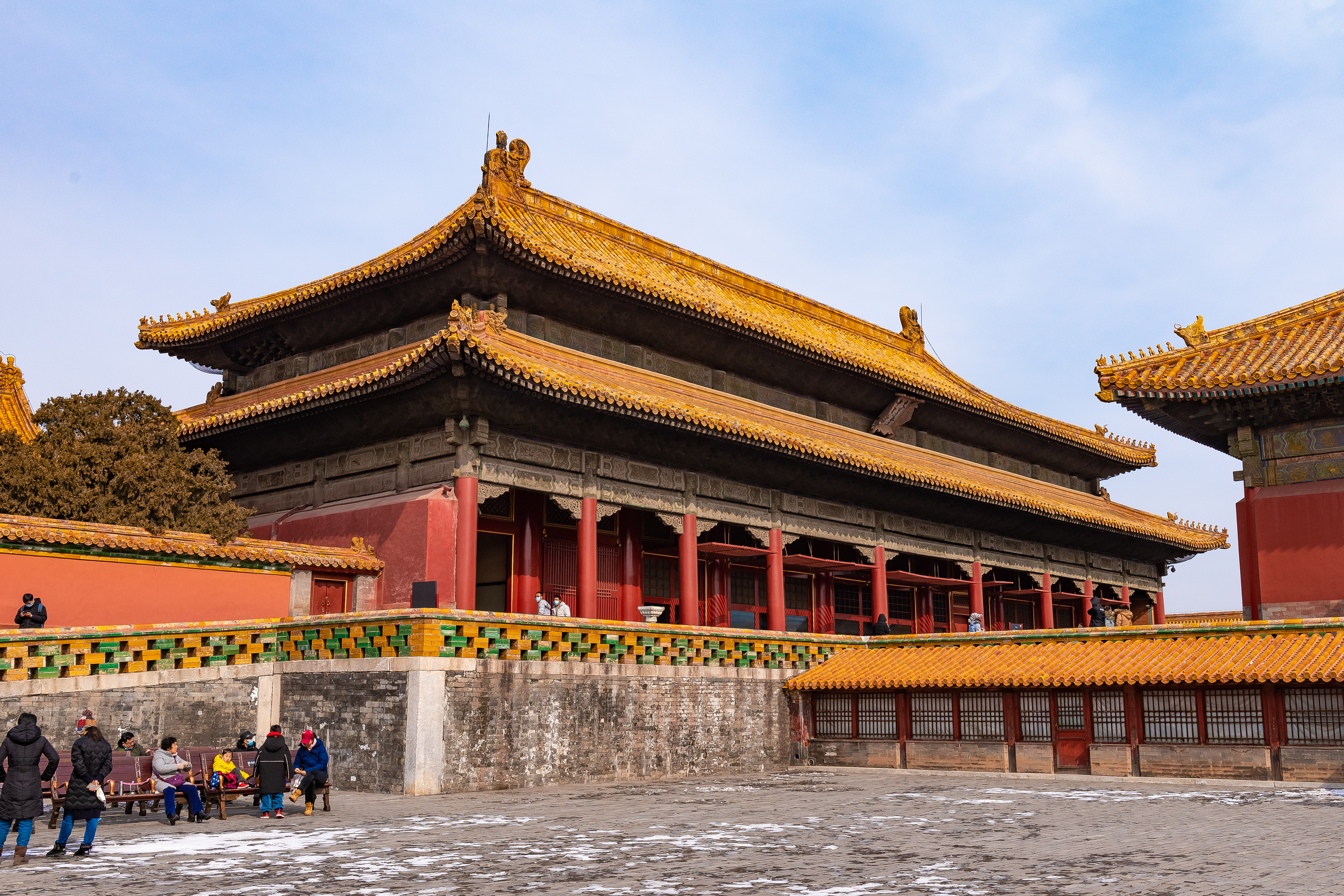
Palace of Earthly Tranquility.

==== Three Rearward Palaces ====
Palace of Heavenly Purity throne room.

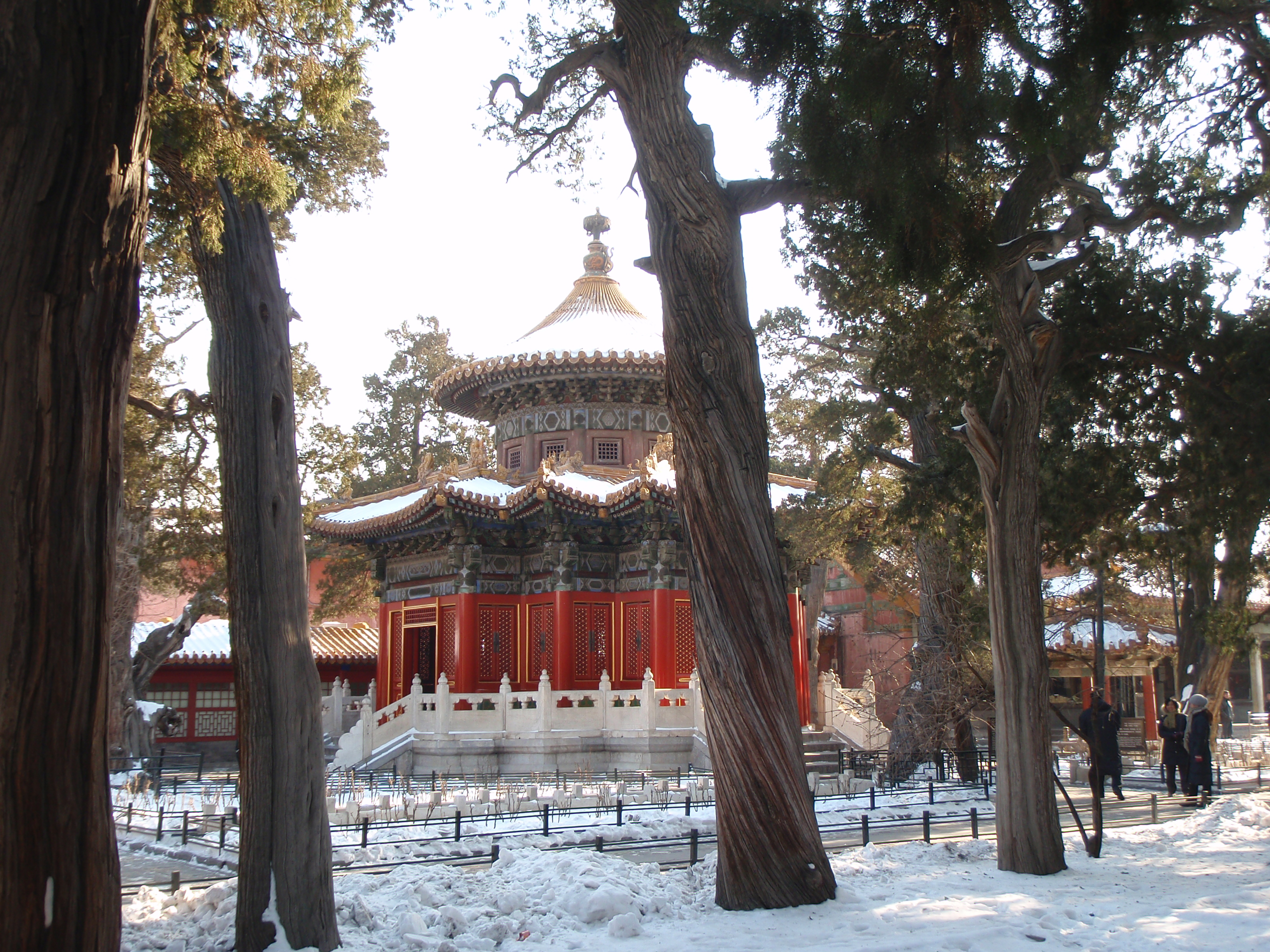
The Imperial Garden

At the centre of the Inner Court is another set of three halls (L). From the south, these are:

- Palace of Heavenly Purity (乾清宮)
- Hall of Union (交泰殿)
- Palace of Earthly Tranquility (坤寧宮)

Smaller than the Outer Court halls, the three halls of the Inner Court were the official residences of the Emperor and the Empress. The Emperor, representing Yang and the Heavens, would occupy the Palace of Heavenly Purity. The Empress, representing Yin and the Earth, would occupy the Palace of Earthly Tranquility. Between them was the Hall of Union, where the Yin and Yang mixed to produce harmony.

The Palace of Heavenly Purity is a double-eaved building, set on a single-level white marble platform. It is connected to the Gate of Heavenly Purity to its south by a raised walkway. In the Ming dynasty, it was the residence of the Emperor; however, beginning from the Yongzheng Emperor of the Qing dynasty, the Emperor lived instead at the smaller Hall of Mental Cultivation (N) to the west, out of respect to the memory of the Kangxi Emperor. The Palace of Heavenly Purity then became the Emperor's audience hall. A caisson is set into the roof, featuring a coiled dragon. Above the throne hangs a tablet reading "Justice and Honour" (正大光明; zhèngdàguāngmíng).

The Palace of Earthly Tranquility (坤寧宮) is a double-eaved building, 9 bays wide and 3 bays deep. In the Ming dynasty, it was the residence of the Empress. In the Qing dynasty, large portions of the Palace were converted for Shamanist worship by the new Manchu rulers. From the reign of the Yongzheng Emperor, the Empress moved out of the Palace. However, two rooms in the Palace of Earthly Harmony were retained for use on the Emperor's wedding night.

Between these two palaces is the Hall of Union, which is square in shape with a pyramidal roof. Stored here are the 25 Imperial Seals of the Qing dynasty, as well as other ceremonial items. Behind these three halls lies the Imperial Garden (M): relatively small and compact in design, the garden nevertheless contains several elaborate landscaping features. To the north of the garden is the Gate of Divine Might.

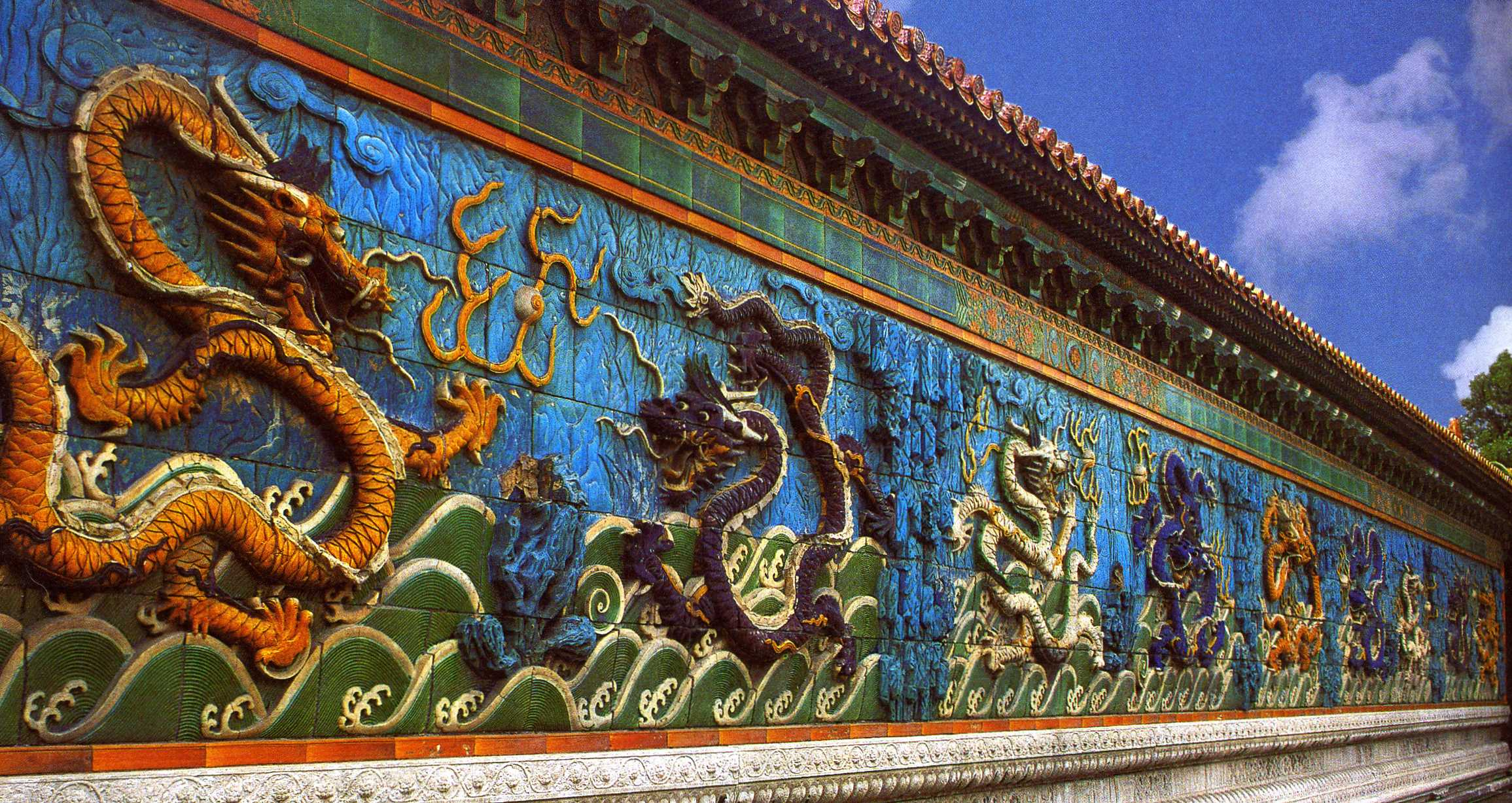
The Nine-Dragon Screen in front of the Palace of Tranquil Longevity

Visual tour of the central axis buildings of the Forbidden City, beginning from Tiananmen Gate till Gate of Divine Might (no audio).

Directly to the west is the Hall of Mental Cultivation (N). Originally a minor palace, this became the de facto residence and office of the Emperor starting from Yongzheng. In the last decades of the Qing dynasty, empresses dowager, including Empress Dowager Cixi, held court from the eastern partition of the hall. Located around the Hall of Mental Cultivation are the offices of the Grand Council and other key government bodies.

The north-eastern section of the Inner Court is taken up by the Palace of Tranquil Longevity (寧壽宮) (O), a complex built by the Qianlong Emperor in anticipation of his retirement. It mirrors the set-up of the Forbidden City proper and features an "outer court", an "inner court", and gardens and temples. The entrance to the Palace of Tranquil Longevity is marked by a glazed-tile Nine-Dragon Screen.

==== Six Western and Six Eastern Palaces ====
To the west and to the east of the three main halls of the inner court are the Six Western Palaces (西六宮; xīliùgōng) and the Six Eastern Palaces (東六宮; dōngliùgōng). These palaces were the residences of the imperial consorts. Six palaces lay to the west and six to the east of the three main halls, hence the name.

The architecture of the twelve palaces, connected by passageways, is more or less the same. The Western and Eastern Palaces each have a layout of three palaces on either side of an alley that runs from north to south. Every palace has its own courtyards, main halls, and side-halls. The main halls stand in the middle and the side-halls are in the east and west. The front courtyard and its main hall was used for receptions, while the back courtyard and its main hall served as living quarters.

An imperial consort with the rank of concubine and above was given a residence in the main section of a palace and was the manager of that palace, an honor in itself. Lower ranking imperial consorts (noble ladies and below) lived in the side halls of the palaces and were supervised by the higher ranking imperial consort.

The twelve palaces were the place where many of the Qing emperors were born and grew up, and they formed the daily life of the imperial family.

During the late Qing era, Empress Dowager Cixi resided in one of the Western Palaces and became known as the "western empress", while her co-regent Empress Dowager Ci'an lived in one of the Eastern Palaces and was thus known as the "eastern empress".

The names of the palaces were:

Western Six Palaces

- Palace of Eternal Longevity (永寿宫; Yǒngshòugōng)
- Hall of the Supreme Principle (太极殿; Tàijídiàn)
- Palace of Eternal Spring (长春宫; Chǎngchūngōng)
- Palace of Earthly Honour (翊坤宫; Yìkūngōng)
- Palace of Gathering Elegance (储秀宫; Chǔxiùgōng)
- Palace of Universal Happiness (咸福宫; Xíanfúgōng)

Eastern Six Palaces

- Palace of Great Benevolence (景仁宫; Jǐngréngōng)
- Palace of Heavenly Grace (承乾宫; Chéngqiángōng)
- Palace of Accumulated Purity (锺粹宫; Zhōngcuìgōng)
- Palace of Prolonging Happiness (延禧宫; Yánxǐgōng)
- Palace of Great Brilliance (景阳宫; Jǐngyánggōng)
- Palace of Eternal Harmony (永和宫; Yǒnghégōng)

==== Cining Palace and Shoukang Palace ====
To the west of the Hall of Mental Cultivation (N) in the western area of the Inner Court is Cining Palace (Palace of Compassion and Tranquility) and Shoukang Palace (Palace of Longevity and Good Health). The palaces were the residences of widowed consorts of previous emperors. In accordance with feudal manners, emperors should not live with the wives of late emperors, so they lived in this separate area of the Inner Court. The Cining palace is bigger and older than Shoukang Palace, which is located to the west of Cining Palace. To the south of Cining Palace is Cining garden.

==== Pavilion of Pleasure ====
The two-storied Pavilion of Pleasure was built in the 17th century, and was used by the emperor for entertainment and "nighttime festivities." The pavilion dominates the roof line of the Forbidden City, but whose courtyard is protected by masonry and high thick walls.

=== Religion ===
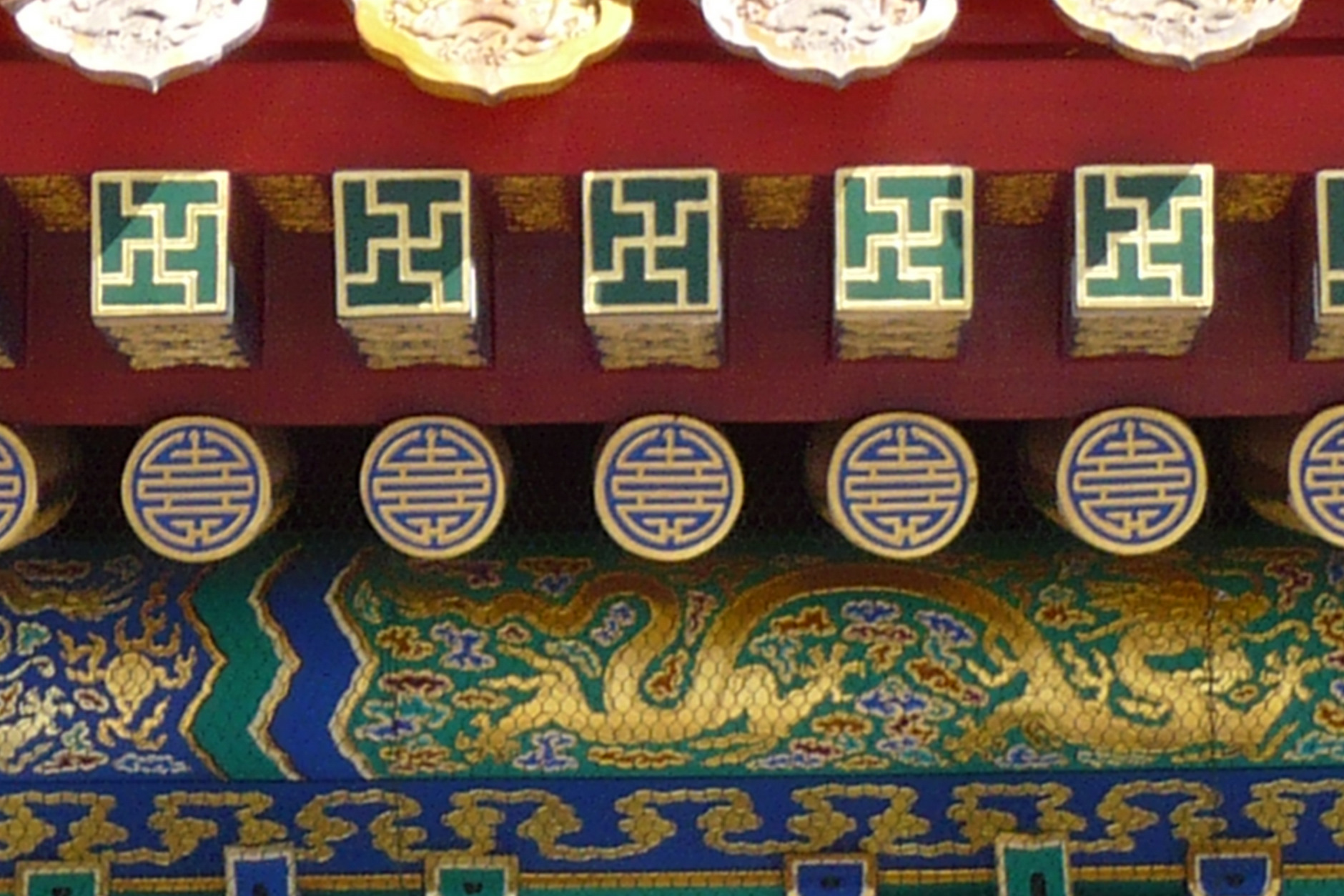
Swastika and Longevity pattern. Similar designs can be found throughout the Imperial City.

Religion was an important part of life for the imperial court. In the Qing dynasty, the Palace of Earthly Harmony became a place of Manchu shamanist ceremony. At the same time, the native Chinese Taoist religion continued to have an important role throughout the Ming and Qing dynasties. There were two Taoist shrines, one in the imperial garden and another in the central area of the Inner Court.

Another prevalent form of religion in the Qing dynasty palace was Buddhism. A number of temples and shrines were scattered throughout the Inner Court, including that of Tibetan Buddhism or Lamaism. Buddhist iconography also proliferated in the interior decorations of many buildings. Of these, the Pavilion of the Rain of Flowers is one of the most important. It housed a large number of Buddhist statues, icons, and mandalas, placed in ritualistic arrangements.

Location of the Forbidden City in the historic center of Beijing

=== Surroundings ===
The palace complex is surrounded by numerous opulent imperial gardens and temples including the 22 ha (54-acre) Zhongshan Park, the sacrificial Imperial Ancestral Temple, the 69 ha (171-acre) Beihai Park, and the 23 ha (57-acre) Jingshan Park.

The Forbidden City is surrounded on three sides by imperial gardens. To the north is Jingshan Park, also known as Prospect Hill, an artificial hill created from the soil excavated to build the moat and from nearby lakes.

To the west lies Zhongnanhai, a former royal garden centred on two connected lakes, which now serves as the central headquarters for the Chinese Communist Party and the State Council of the People's Republic of China. To the north-west lies Beihai Park, also centred on a lake connected to the southern two, and a popular royal park.

To the south of the Forbidden City were two important shrines – the Imperial Shrine of Family or the Imperial Ancestral Temple (Chinese: 太廟; pinyin: Tàimiào) and the Imperial Shrine of State or Beijing Shejitan (Chinese: 社稷壇; pinyin: Shèjìtán), where the Emperor would venerate the spirits of his ancestors and the spirit of the nation, respectively. Today, these are the Beijing Labouring People's Cultural Hall and Zhongshan Park (commemorating Sun Yat-sen) respectively.

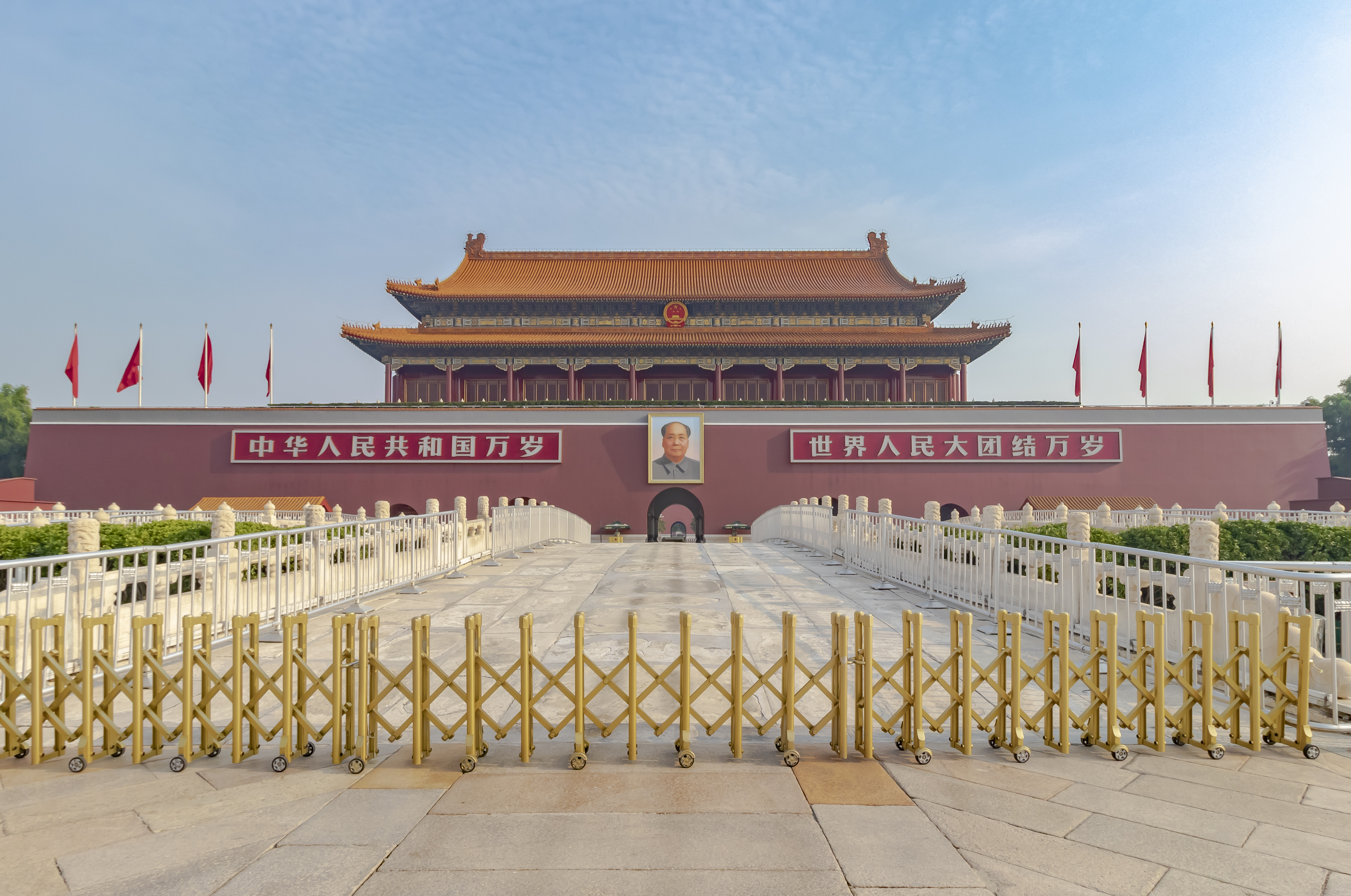
Tiananmen Gate

To the south, two nearly identical gatehouses stand along the main axis. They are the Upright Gate (Chinese: 端门; pinyin: Duānmén) and the more famous Tiananmen Gate, which is decorated with a portrait of Mao Zedong in the centre and two placards to the left and right: "Long Live the People's Republic of China" (Chinese: 中华人民共和国万岁; pinyin: zhōnghuá rénmín gònghéguó wànsuì) and "Long live the Great Unity of the World's Peoples" (Chinese: 世界人民大团结万岁; pinyin: shìjiè rénmín dàtuánjié wànsuì). The Tiananmen Gate connects the Forbidden City precinct with the modern, symbolic centre of the Chinese state, Tiananmen Square.

While development is now tightly controlled in the vicinity of the Forbidden City, throughout the past century uncontrolled and sometimes politically motivated demolition and reconstruction has changed the character of the areas surrounding the Forbidden City. Since 2000, the Beijing municipal government has worked to evict governmental and military institutions occupying some historical buildings, and has established a park around the remaining parts of the Imperial City wall. In 2004, an ordinance relating to building height and planning restriction was renewed to establish the Imperial City area and the northern city area as a buffer zone for the Forbidden City. In 2005, the Imperial City and Beihai (as an extension item to the Summer Palace) were included in the shortlist for the next World Heritage Site in Beijing.

== Architecture ==
=== Symbolism ===
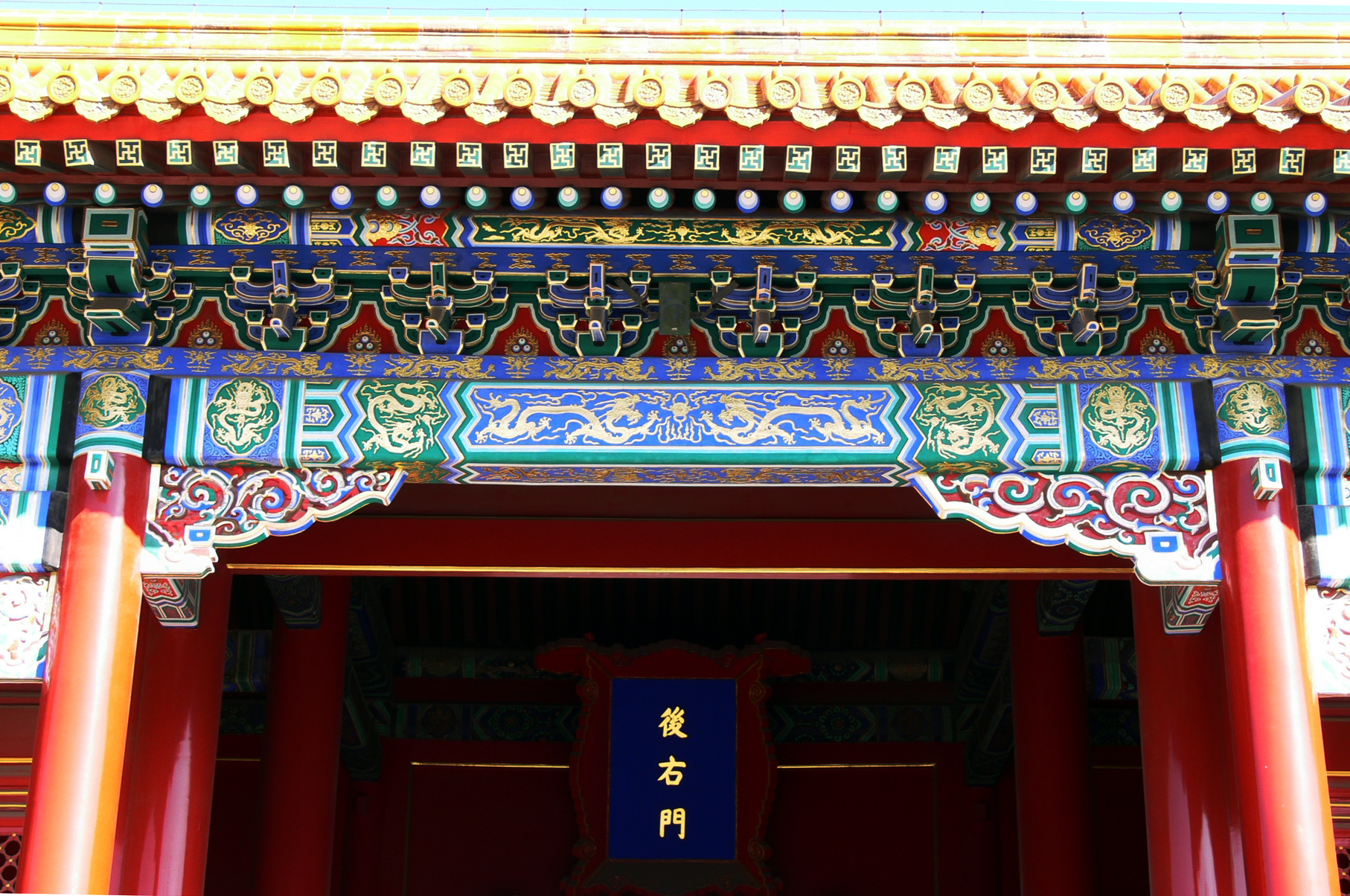
The highest status color reflected on the Imperial Palace roof ridge of the Hall of Supreme Harmony

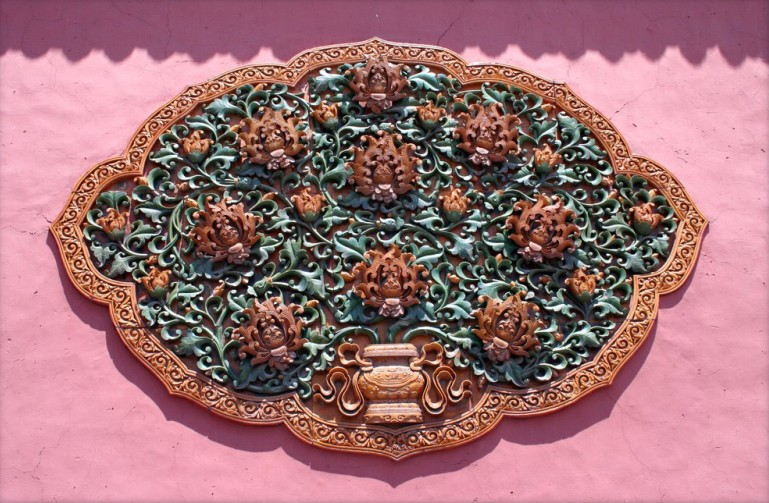
Glazed building decoration

The design of the Forbidden City, from its overall layout to the smallest detail, was meticulously planned to reflect philosophical and religious principles, and above all to symbolize the majesty of Imperial power. Some noted examples of symbolic designs include:

- Yellow is the color of the Emperor, thus almost all roofs in the Forbidden City bear yellow glazed tiles. There are only two exceptions: the library at the Pavilion of Literary Profundity (文淵閣) had black tiles because black was associated with water, and thus fire-prevention; similarly, the Crown Prince's residences have green tiles because green was associated with wood, and thus growth.
- The main halls of the Outer and Inner courts are all arranged in groups of three – the shape of the Qian trigram ☰, representing Heaven. The residences of the Inner Court on the other hand are arranged in clusters of six – the shape of the Kun trigram ☷, representing the Earth.
- The sloping ridges of building roofs are decorated with a line of statuettes led by a man riding a phoenix and followed by an imperial dragon. The number of statuettes represents the status of the building – a minor building might have three or five. The Hall of Supreme Harmony has ten, the only building in the country to be permitted this in Imperial times. As a result, its tenth statuette, called a "Hangshi", or "ranked tenth" (行十; Hángshí), is also unique in the Forbidden City.
- The layout of buildings follows ancient customs laid down in the Book of Rites: thus, ancestral temples are in front of the palace, storage areas are placed in the front part of the palace complex, and residences are in the back.

== Collections ==
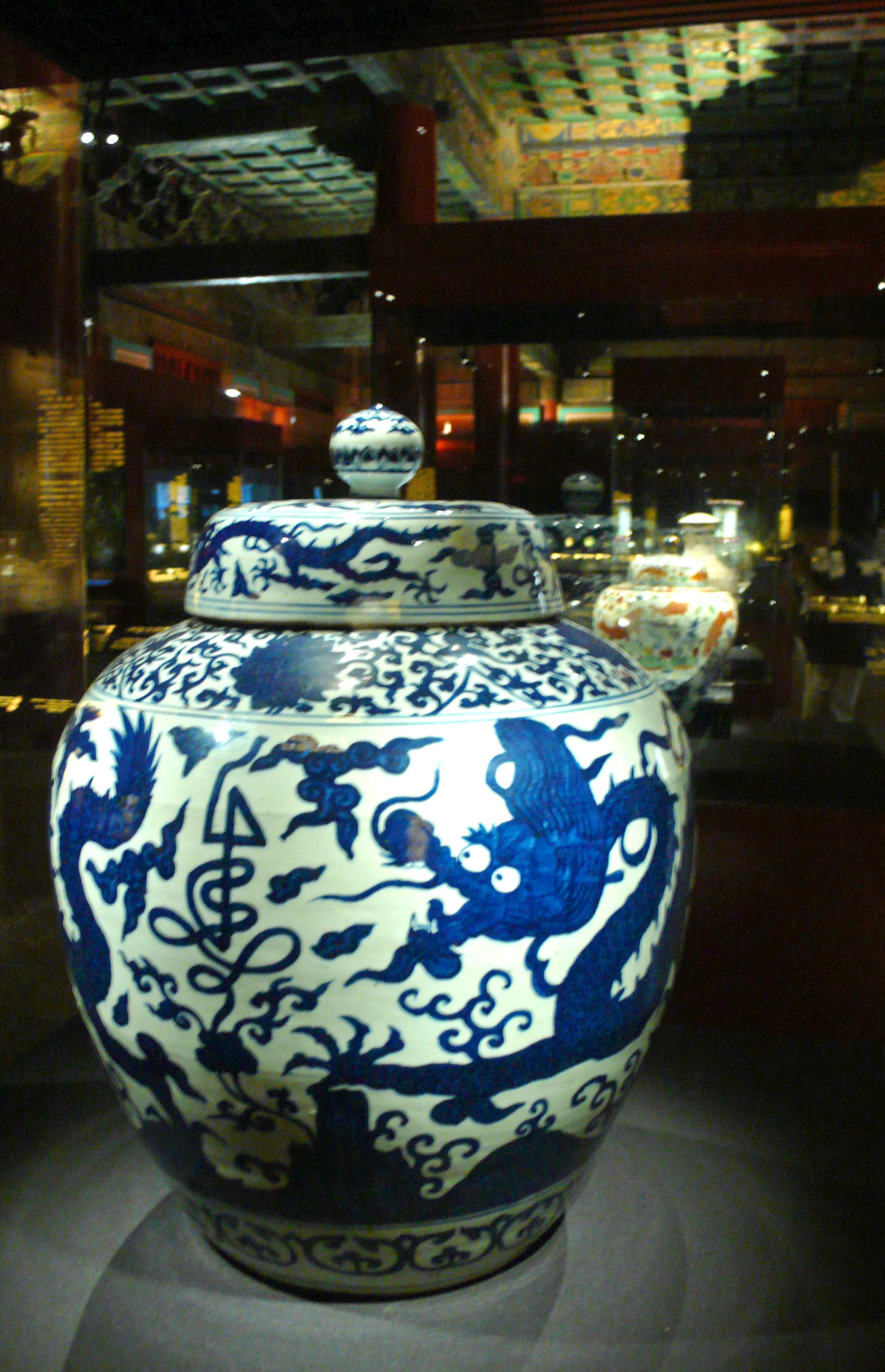
Blue and white porcelain vase with cloud and dragon designs, marked with the word "longevity" (寿; shòu) (Jiajing period of the Ming dynasty).

The collections of the Palace Museum are based on the Qing imperial collection, including paintings, ceramics, seals, steles, sculptures, inscribed wares, bronze wares, and enamel objects. According to the latest audit, it has 1,862,690 pieces of art. In addition, the imperial libraries housed a large collection of rare books and historical documents, including government documents of the Ming and Qing dynasties, which has since been transferred to the First Historical Archives.

From 1933, the threat of Japanese invasion forced the evacuation of the most important parts of the Museum's collection. After the end of World War II, this collection was returned to Nanjing. However, with the imminent victory of the Communist Party in the Chinese Civil War, the Nationalist government decided to ship the pick of this collection to Taiwan. Of the 13,491 boxes of evacuated artefacts, 2,972 boxes are now housed in the National Palace Museum in Taipei. More than 8,000 boxes were returned to Beijing, but 2,221 boxes remain in storage today under the charge of the Nanjing Museum.

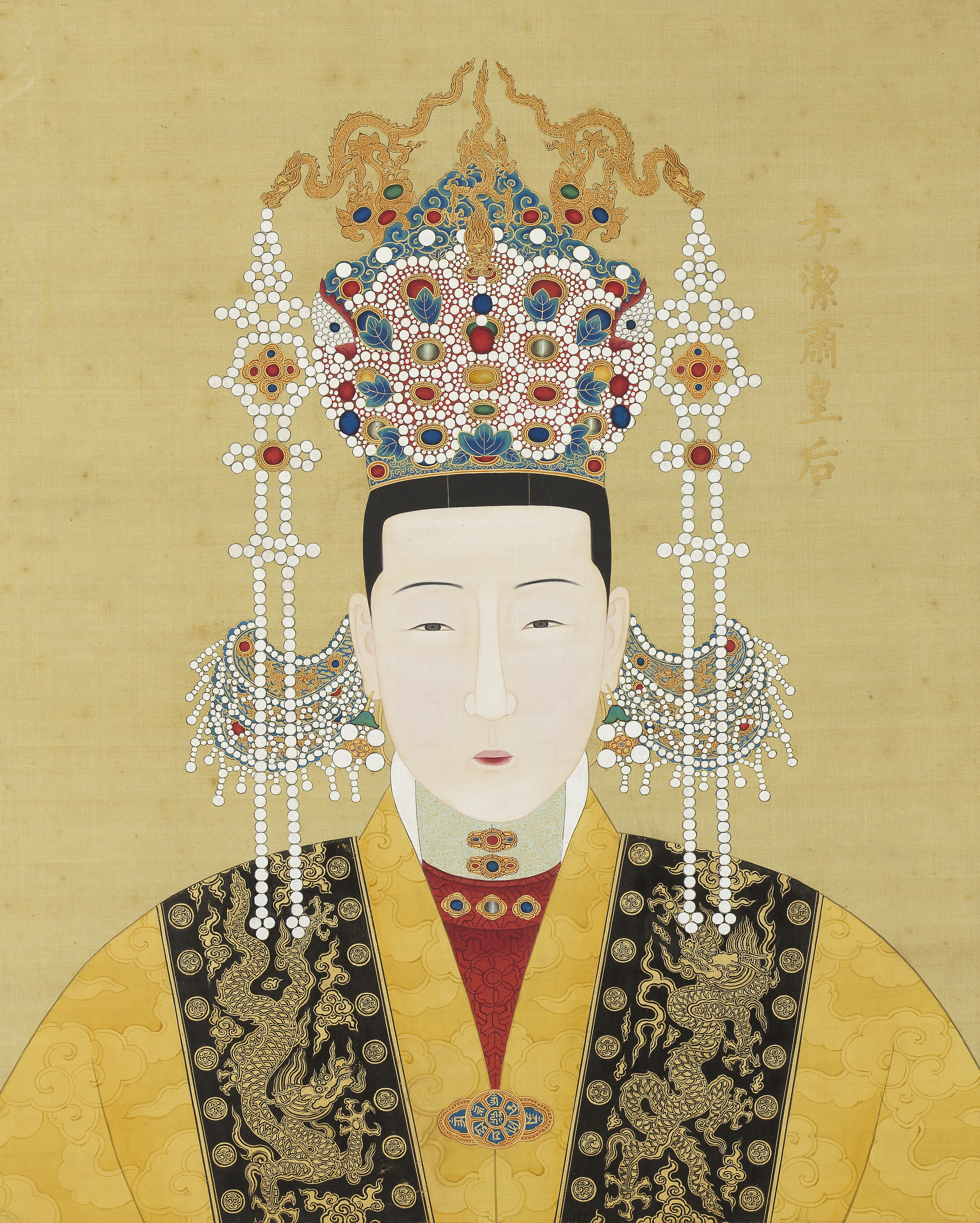
Portrait of Empress Xiaojiesu (1508–1528), first wife of the Jiajing Emperor.

The Palace Museum holds 340,000 pieces of ceramics and porcelain. These include imperial collections from the Tang dynasty and the Song dynasty. It has close to 50,000 paintings, within which more than 400 date from before the Yuan dynasty (1271–1368), which is the largest collection in China. Its bronze collection dates from the early Shang dynasty. Of the almost 10,000 pieces held, about 1,600 are inscribed items from the pre-Qin period (to 221 BC). A significant part of the collection is ceremonial bronzeware from the imperial court.

The Palace Museum has one of the largest collections of mechanical timepieces of the 18th and 19th centuries in the world, with more than 1,000 pieces. The collection contains both Chinese- and foreign-made pieces. Chinese pieces came from the palace's own workshops, while foreign pieces came from countries including Britain, France, Switzerland, the United States, and Japan. Of these, the largest portion come from Britain. Jade has a unique place in Chinese culture. The Museum's collection includes some 30,000 pieces. The pre-Yuan dynasty part of the collection includes several pieces famed throughout history. The earliest pieces date from the Neolithic period. In addition to works of art, a large portion of the Museum's collection consists of the artifacts of the imperial court. This includes items used by the imperial family and the palace in daily life. This comprehensive collection preserves the daily life and ceremonial protocols of the imperial era.

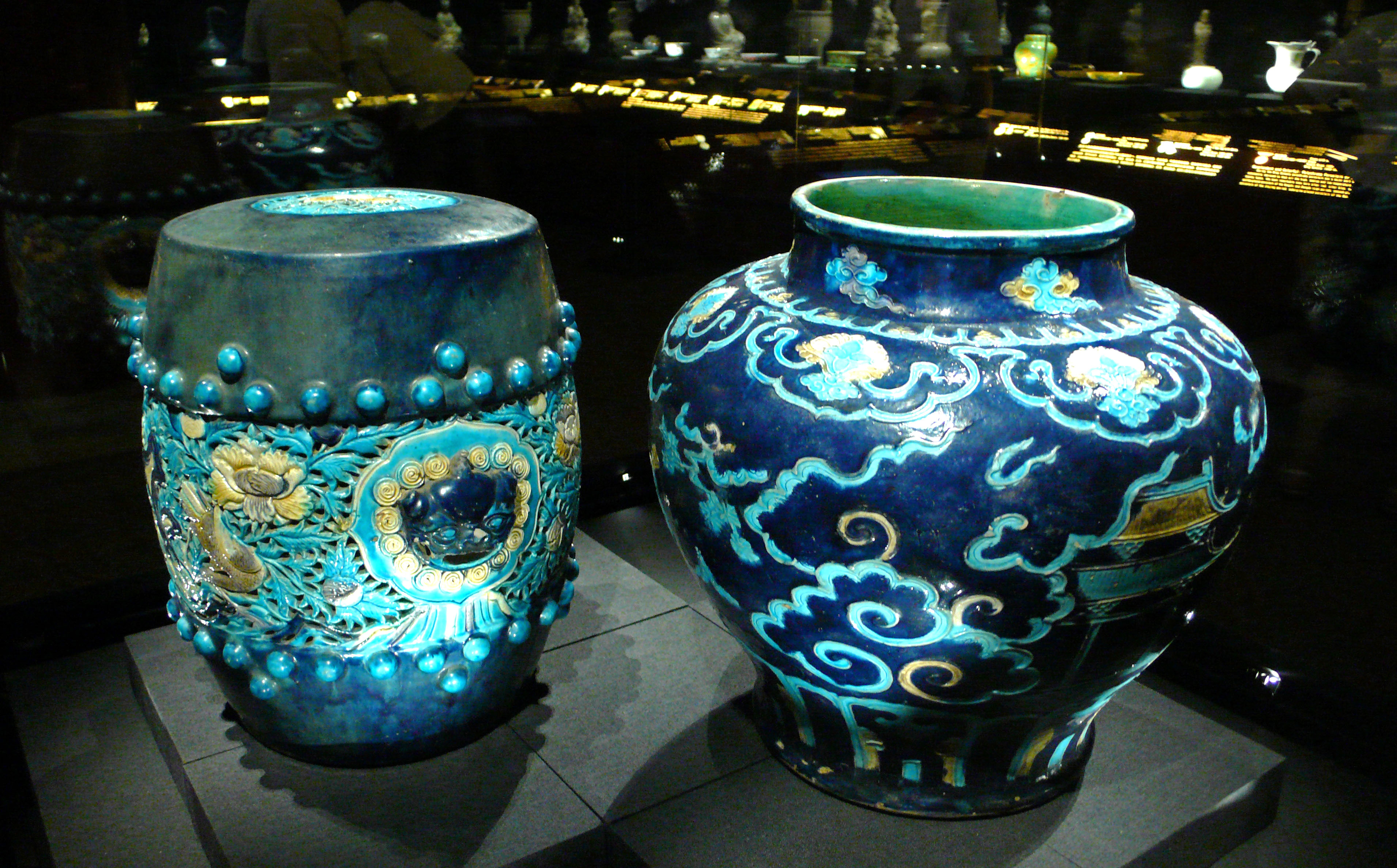
Two blue porcelain wares (Qing dynasty)

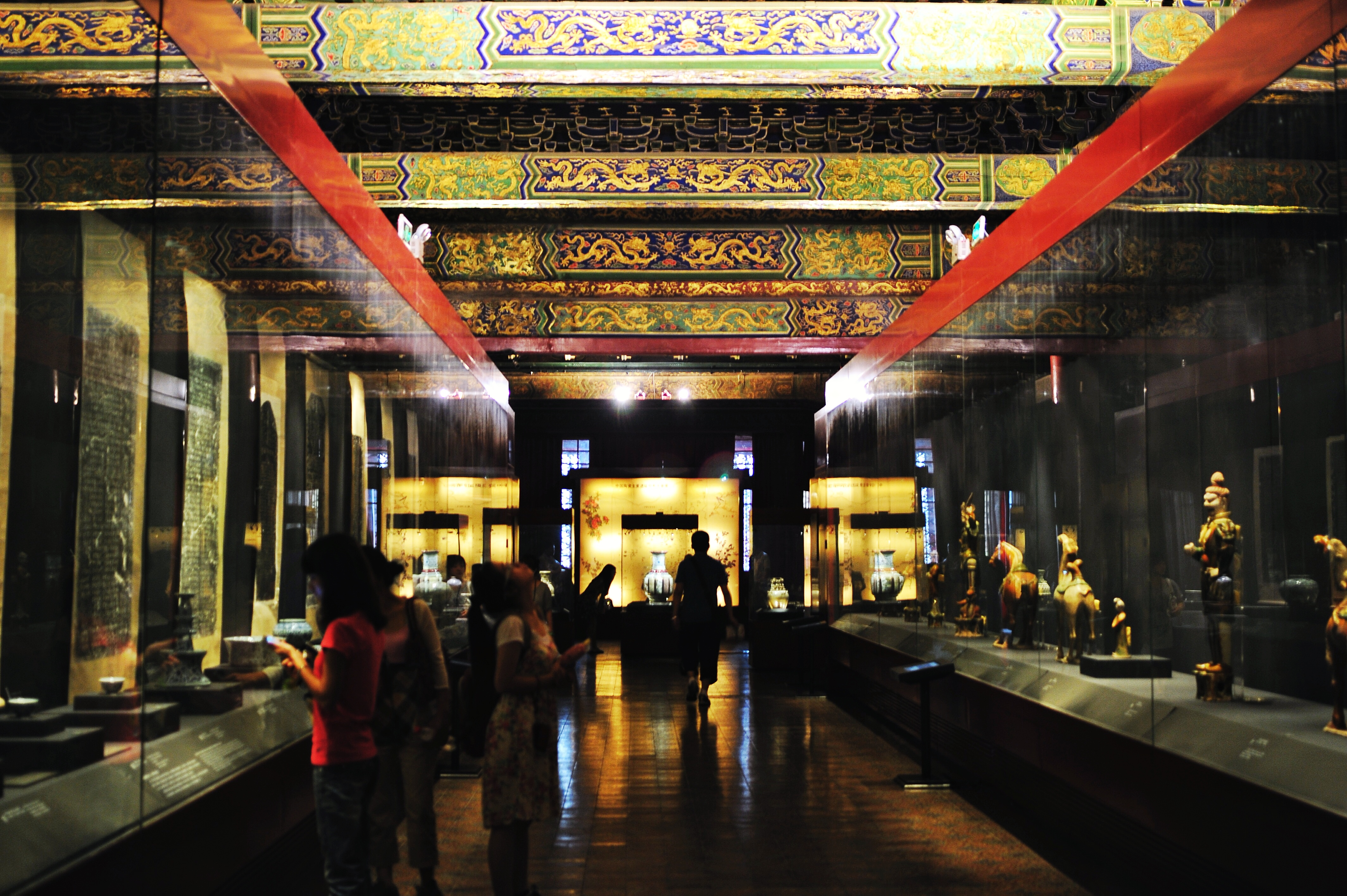
Exhibits on display in the corridor connecting the Hall of Literary Glory and the Hall of Main Respect

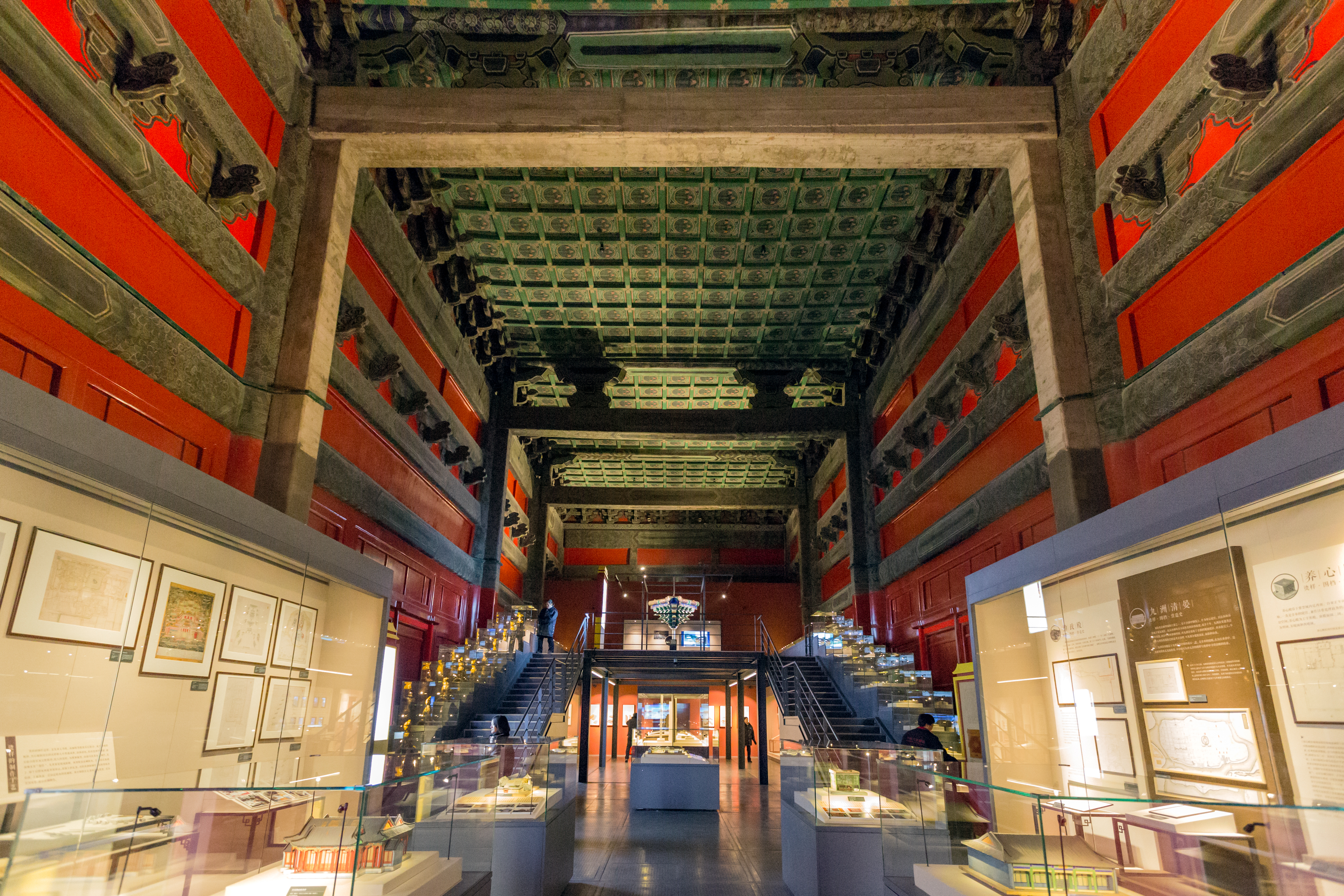
Inside the East Glorious Gate

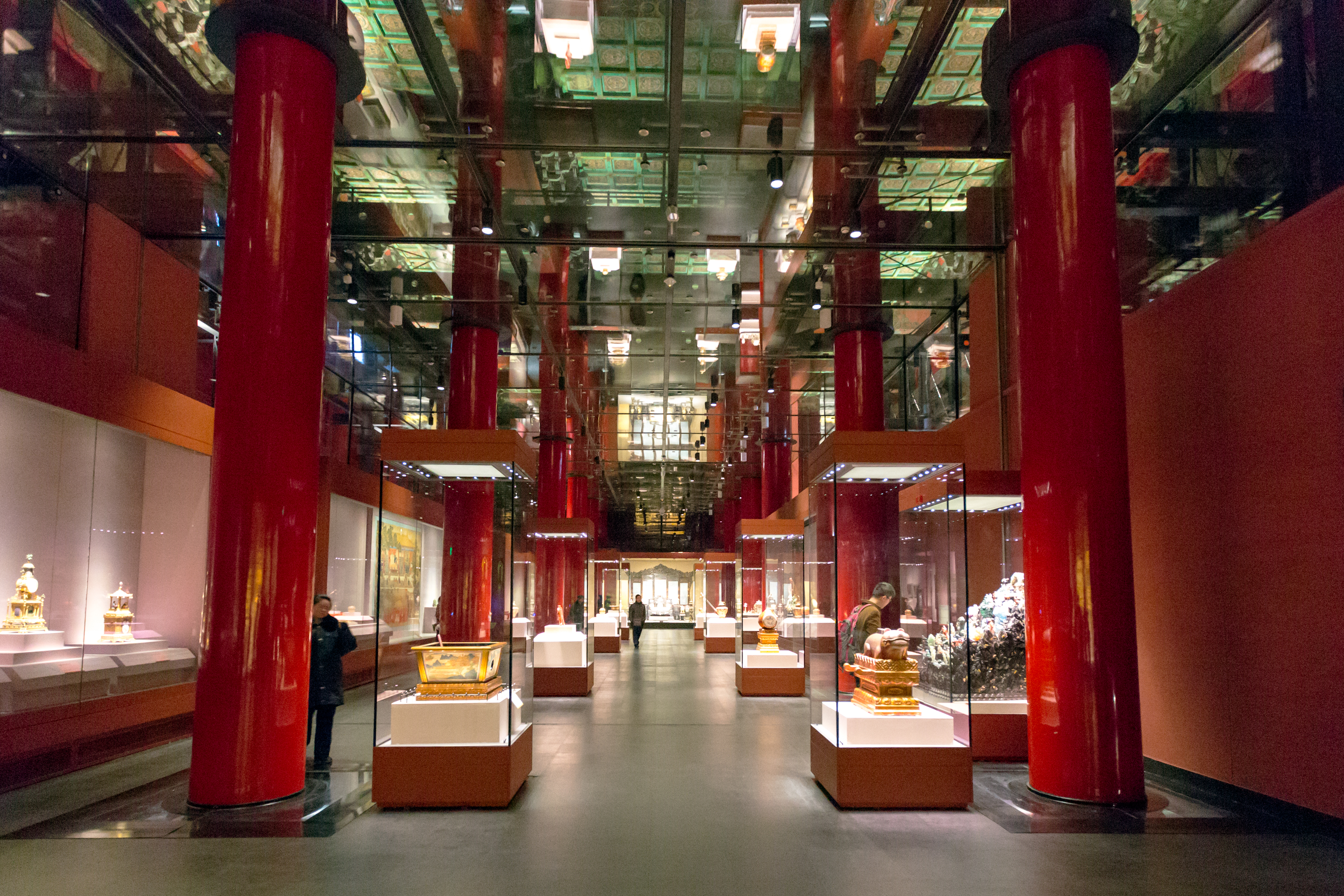
Inside the West Wing of the Meridian Gate

== Influence ==
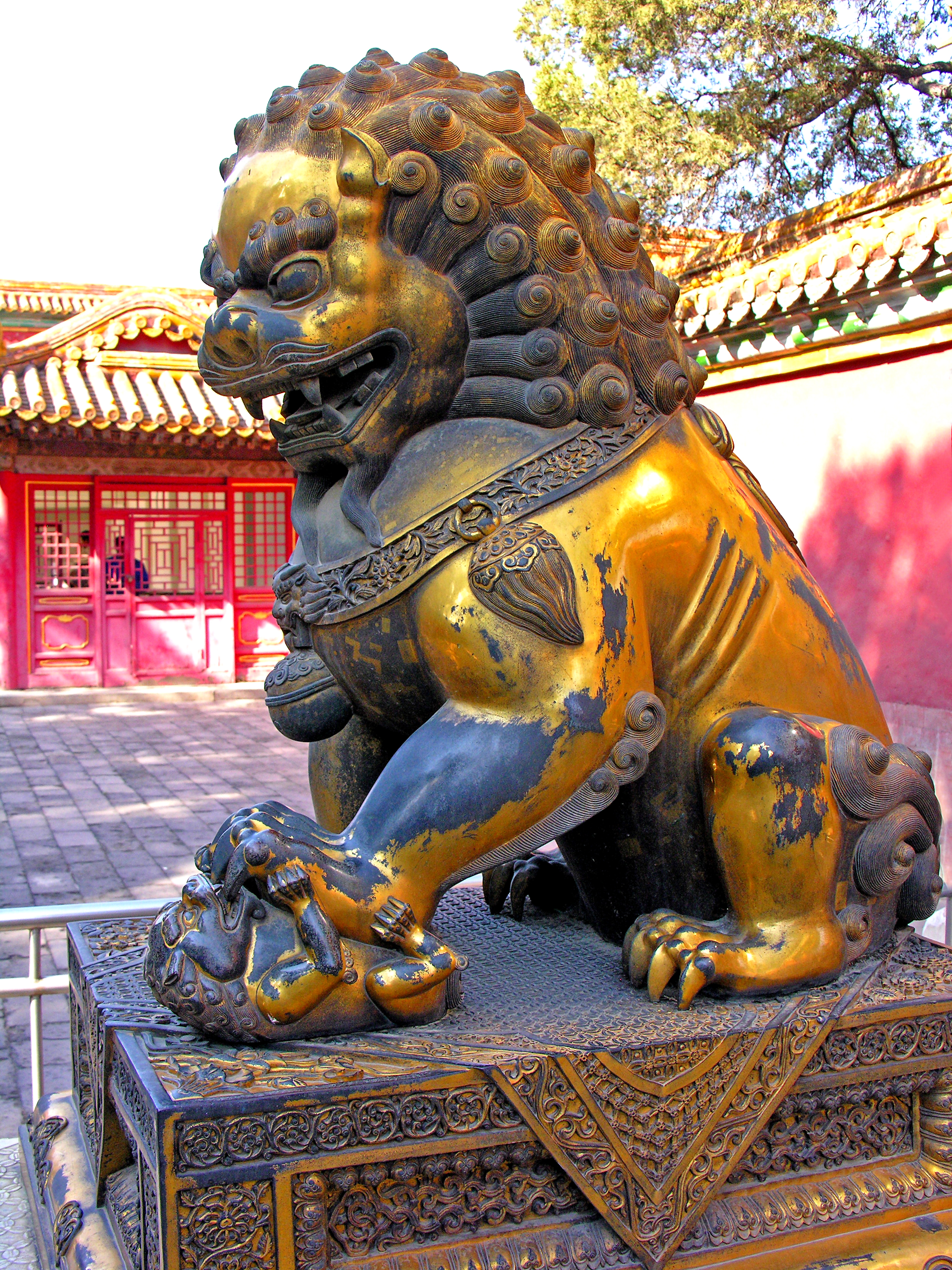
A gilded lion in front of the Hall of Mental Cultivation

The Forbidden City has been influential in the subsequent development of Chinese architecture, as well as in providing inspiration for many artistic works.

=== Depiction in art, film, literature and popular culture ===
The Forbidden City has served as the scene to many works of fiction. In recent years, it has been depicted in films and television series. Some notable examples include:

- The Forbidden City (1918), a fiction film about a Chinese emperor and an American.
- The Last Emperor (1987), a biographical film about Puyi, which was the first feature film ever authorised by the government of the People's Republic of China to be filmed in the Forbidden City.
- Forbidden City Cop (1996), a Hong Kong wuxia comedy film about an imperial secret agent.

== Replicas ==
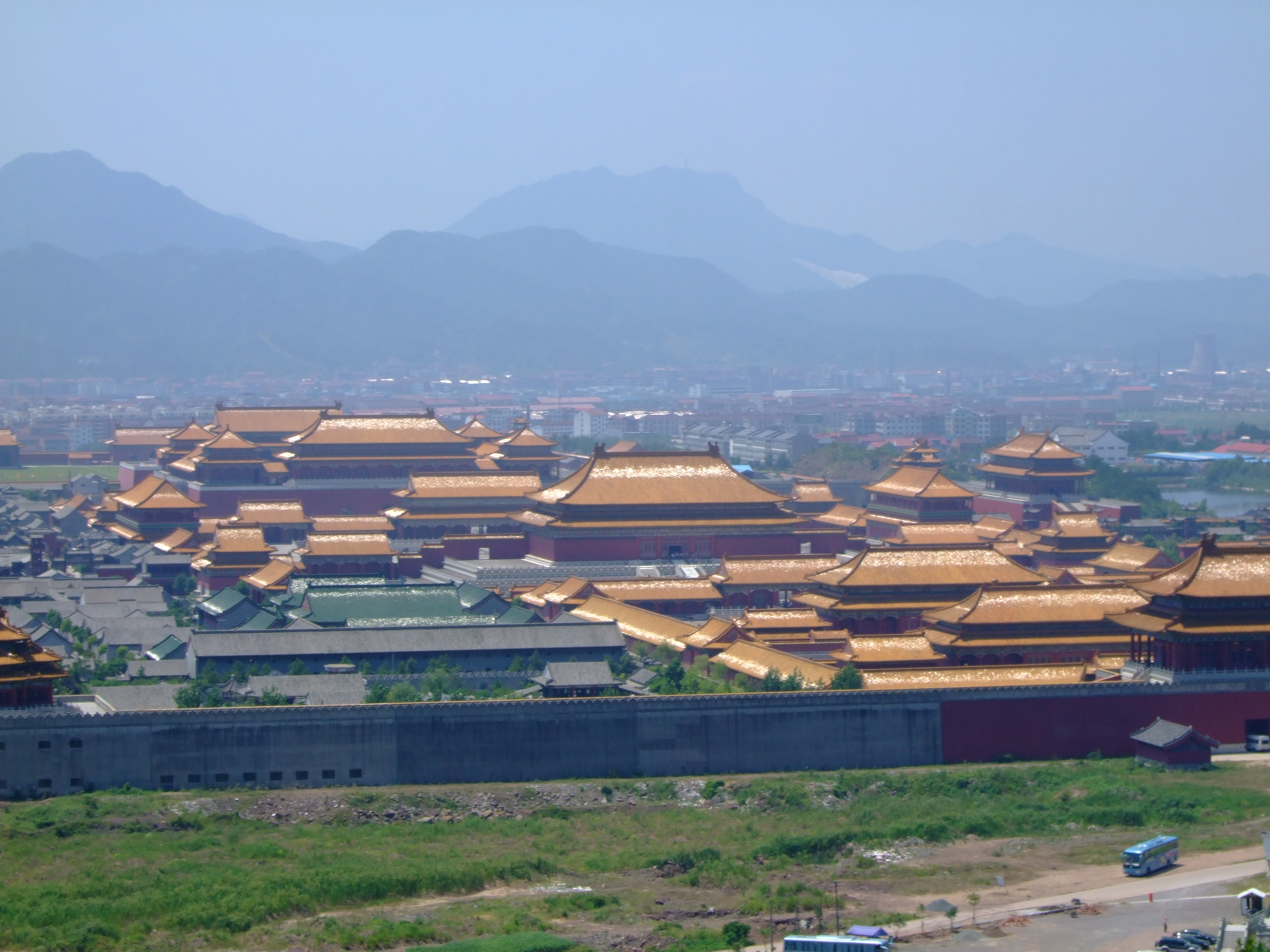
Replica of the Forbidden City at the Hengdian World Studios in Dongyang, Zhejiang Province.

A large replica of the Forbidden City is included within the Hengdian World Studios in Dongyang, Zhejiang Province, and a section of the replica has been used by many Chinese period-films and television shows for filming. After the Forbidden City gained World Heritage status in 1987, filmography was restricted within the palace-proper due to concerns that filmography work would risk damage to the historical site itself; thus, the Hengdian World Studio-replica is one of the only legal alternatives for filming "on location" with movies set in the Forbidden City.

== See also ==
- Imperial Chinese harem system
- Forbidden City cats
- Imperial City of Huế
- Topkapı Palace – Imperial Ottoman palace complex-equivalent (1478–1924).
