= Imperial Palaces of the Ming and Qing Dynasties in Beijing and Shenyang =

Imperial Palaces of the Ming and Qing Dynasties in Beijing and Shenyang may refer to:

- Forbidden City in Beijing
- Mukden Palace in Shenyang
