= Throne of England =

Throne of the Monarch of England

The Throne of England is the throne of the Monarch of England. "Throne of England" also refers metonymically to the office of monarch, and monarchy itself. The term "Throne of Great Britain" has been used in reference to Sovereign's Throne in the House of Lords, from which a monarch gives his or her speech at the State opening of Parliament.

== History ==
The English Throne is one of the oldest continuing hereditary monarchies in the world. In much the same sense as The Crown, the Throne of England becomes an abstract metonymic concept that represents the legal authority for the existence of the government. It evolved naturally as a separation of the literal throne and property of the nation-state from the person and personal property of the monarch.

According to tradition, the roots of British monarchy extend into legends before the ninth-century king Alfred the Great. On 1 May 1707, the Kingdom of Great Britain was created by the political union of the Kingdom of England and the Kingdom of Scotland. In this period, the "Throne of the United Kingdom" was merged in usage with the "Throne of England."

The modern King or Queen is a constitutional monarch, and the 20th century governmental policies of devolution have accorded new emphasis on the Throne of England and the Throne of Scotland.

The fungible meanings of "Throne of England" encompass the modern monarchy and the chronological list of legendary and historical monarchs of England, Scotland and the United Kingdom.

== Rhetorical usage ==
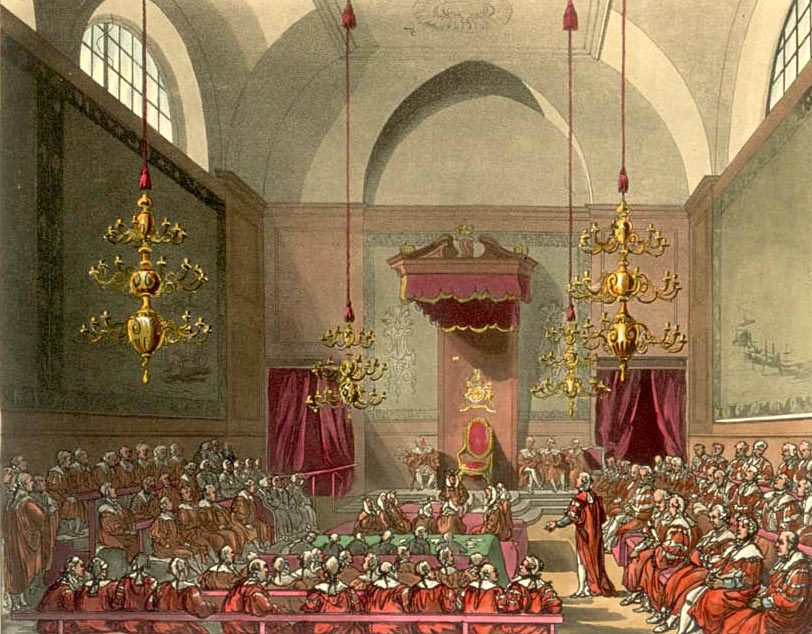
This view of the throne in the Palace of Westminster shows the House of Lords in session in the early 19th century before old palace was destroyed by fire in 1834.

This flexible English term is also a rhetorical trope. Depending on context, the Throne of England can be construed as a metonymy, which is a rhetorical device for an allusion relying on proximity or correspondence, as for example referring to actions of the king or queen or as "actions of the throne." The throne is also understood as a synecdoche, which is related to metonymy and metaphor in suggesting a play on words by identifying a closely related conceptualisation, e.g.,

- referring to a part with the name of the whole, such as "the throne" for the mystic process of transferring monarchic authority.
- referring to the whole with the name of a part, such as "the throne" for the serial symbols and ceremonies of enthronement.
- referring to the general with the specific, such as "the throne" for kingship.
- referring to the specific with the general, such as "the throne" for the short reign of Edward VIII or equally as well for the ambit of the British monarchy.

== See also ==
- Coronation Chair
- The Crown
- List of English monarchs
- List of Scottish monarchs
- National emblem
  - Dragon Throne of the Emperors of China
  - Chrysanthemum Throne of the Emperors of Japan
  - Phoenix Throne of the Kings of Korea
  - Lion Throne of the Dalai Lama of Tibet
  - Peacock Throne of the Mughal Empire
  - Peacock Throne of the Persian Empire
  - Naderi Throne in Iran
  - Silver Throne – the Throne of Sweden
  - Thailand Throne – the Throne of Thailand
