= Chrysanthemum Throne =

Throne of the Emperor of Japan

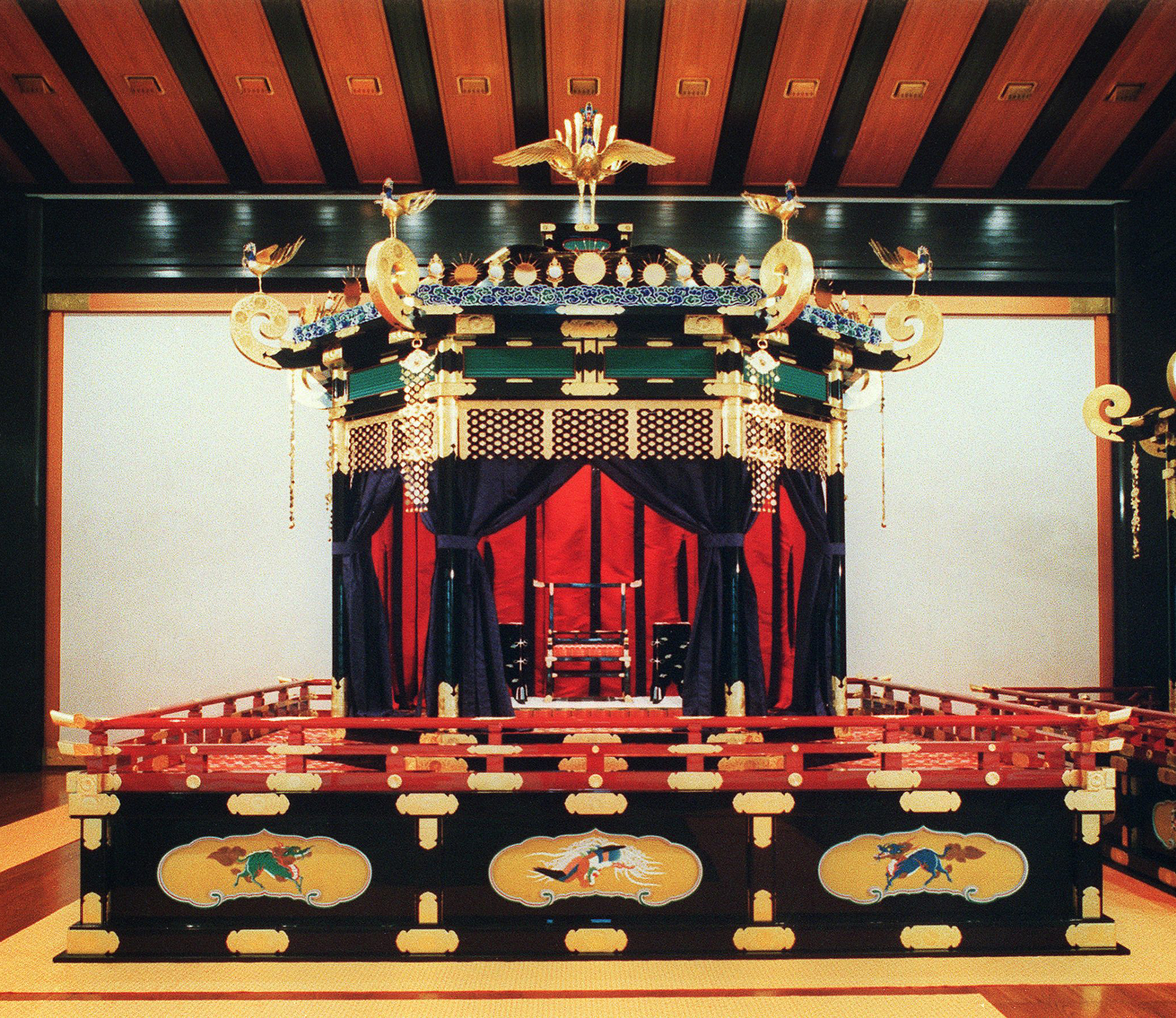
The Takamikura throne kept in the Kyoto Imperial Palace is used for accession ceremonies. It was used for the enthronement of Emperor Naruhito in 2019.

The Chrysanthemum Throne (Japanese: 皇位, Hepburn: kōi; "imperial seat") is the throne of the Emperor of Japan. The term also can refer to very specific seating, such as the Takamikura (高御座) throne in the Shishin-den at Kyoto Imperial Palace.

Various other thrones or seats that are used by the Emperor during official functions, such as those used in the Tokyo Imperial Palace or the throne used in the Speech from the Throne ceremony in the National Diet, are, however, not known as the "Chrysanthemum Throne".

"Chrysanthemum Throne" is also a metonym for the head of state and the institution of the Japanese monarchy itself.

== History ==
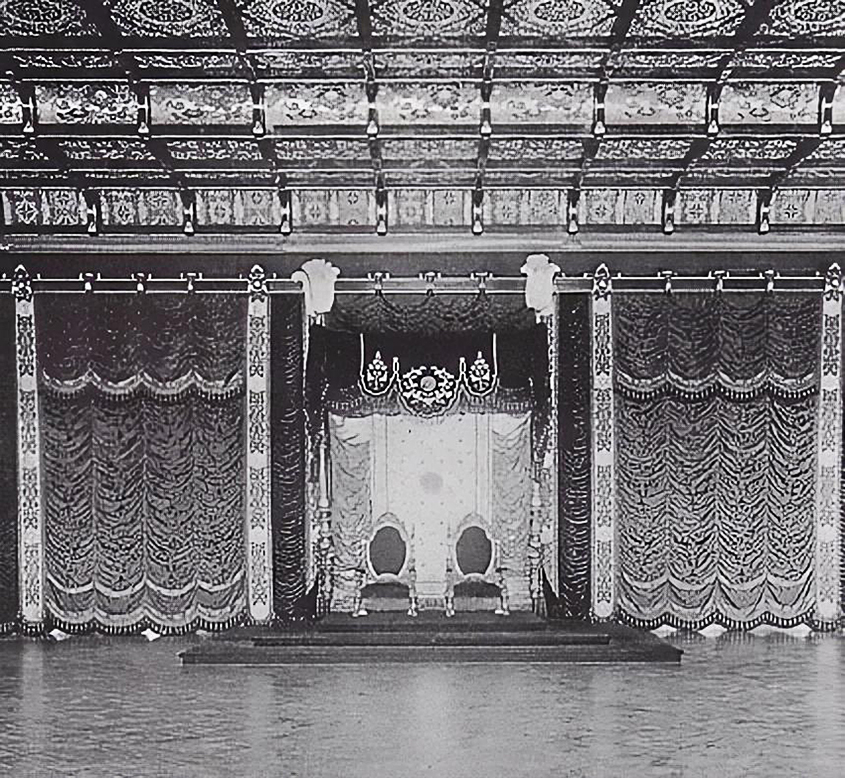
Main audience hall with western-style thrones in the Tokyo Imperial Palace, from the Meiji period

In much the same sense as the British Crown, the Chrysanthemum Throne is an abstract metonymic concept that represents the monarch and the legal authority for the existence of the government. Unlike its British counterpart, the concepts of Japanese monarchy evolved differently before 1947 when there was, for example, no perceived separation of the property of the nation-state from the person and personal holdings of the Emperor.

According to legend, the Japanese monarchy is said to have been founded in 660 BCE by Emperor Jimmu; Emperor Naruhito is the 126th monarch to occupy the Chrysanthemum Throne. The extant historical records only reach back to Emperor Ōjin, regarded as the 15th emperor, and who is considered to have reigned into the early 4th century.

In the 1920s, then-Crown Prince Hirohito served as regent during several years of his father's reign, when Emperor Taishō was physically unable to fulfill his duties. However, the Prince Regent lacked the symbolic powers of the throne which he could only attain after his father's death.

The current Constitution of Japan considers the Emperor as "the symbol of the State and of the unity of the people". Its divinity was denied in 1946 at the request of the Supreme Commander for the Allied Powers. Hence, the modern Emperor is a constitutional monarch with little to no actual power. The metonymic meanings of "Chrysanthemum Throne" encompass the modern monarchy and the chronological list of legendary and historical monarchs of Japan.

== Takamikura ==
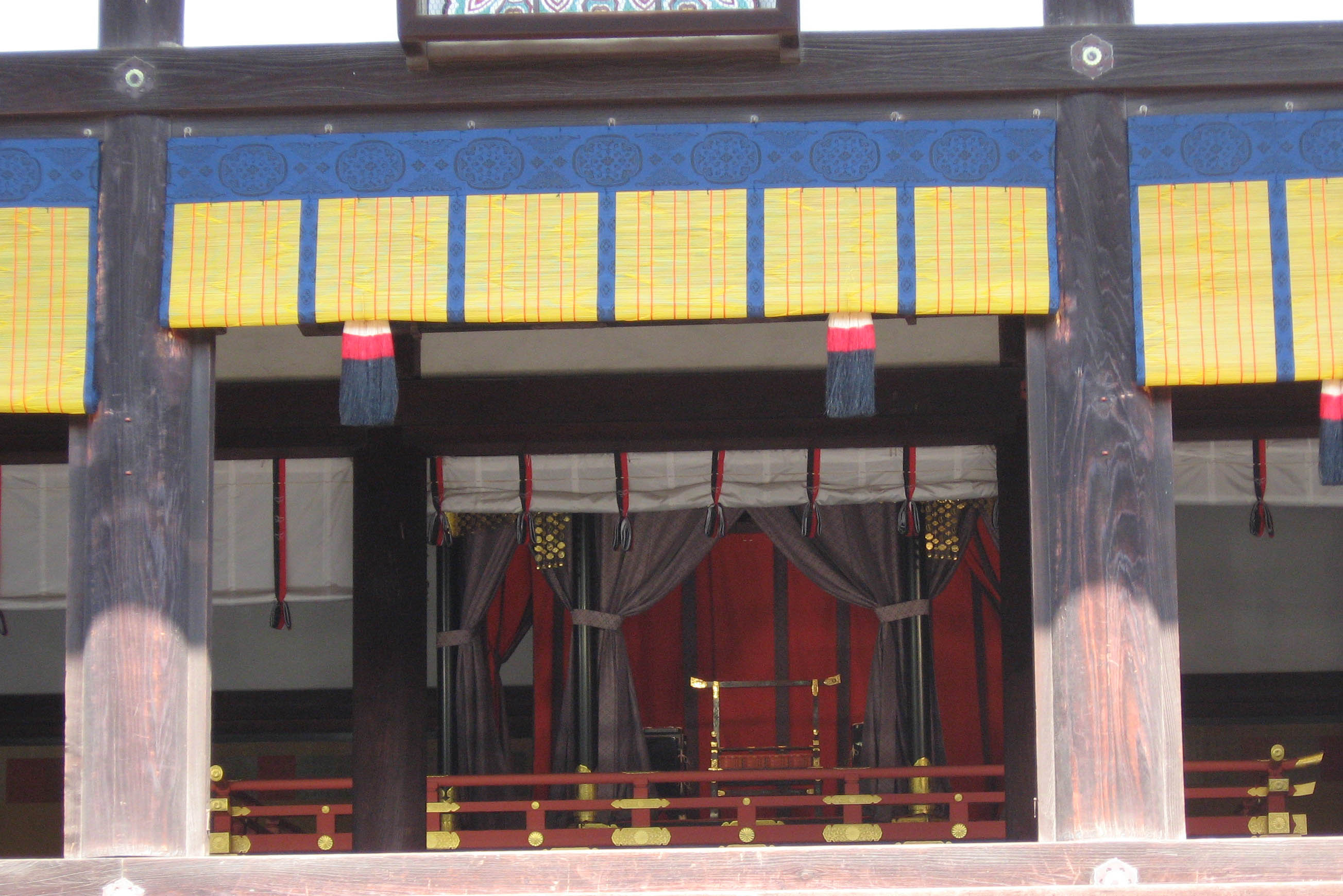
The Takamikura in the Kyoto Imperial Palace.

The Takamikura (高御座) is the ceremonial seat of the Emperor of Japan, used most notably at imperial enthronements. Although commonly rendered in English as "imperial throne", it does not refer only to the chair on which the emperor sits; historically, it has been organized around a raised platform together with elements such as pillars, curtains and a canopy. Since the enthronement of Emperor Taishō in 1915, a goishi (御倚子, imperial chair) has been placed inside the Takamikura during enthronement ceremonies. The present Takamikura was constructed for that enthronement and is normally housed in the Shishinden of the Kyoto Imperial Palace.

== Emperor's throne in parliament ==
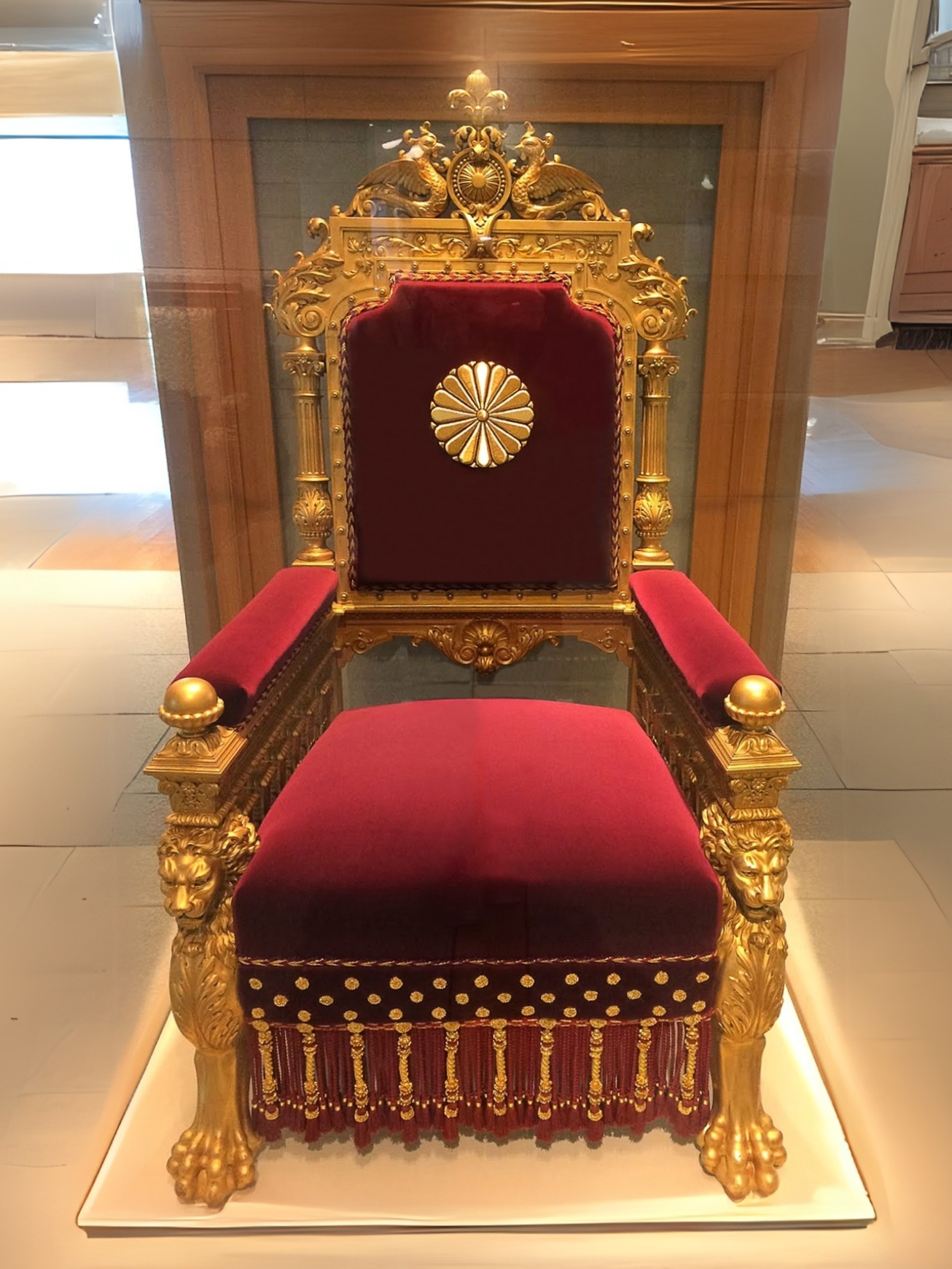
The emperor's throne used for speeches from the throne at the opening of parliament

The emperor's throne is a western-style Meiji period chair used in the House of Peers from 1868 until 1912. The emperor still uses the throne during ceremonies of the National Diet and for non-political statements. For example, he uses the throne during the Speech from the Throne ceremony in the House of Councillors. The ceremony opens ordinary Diet sessions (each January and after elections) and extra sessions (usually in autumn).

The throne features real gold with details such as the 16 petal chrysanthemum seal, two lion heads, two phoenixes and the sun disc.

== Rhetorical usage ==
This flexible English term is also a rhetorical trope. Depending on context, the Chrysanthemum Throne can be construed as a metonymy, which is a rhetorical device for an allusion relying on proximity or correspondence, as for example referring to actions of the Emperor as "actions of the Chrysanthemum Throne." e.g.,

- referring to a part with the name of the whole, such as "Chrysanthemum Throne" for the mystic process of transferring Imperial authority—as in:

18 December 876 (Jōgan 18, on the 29th day of the 11th month): In the 18th year of Emperor Seiwa's reign (清和天皇18年), he ceded the Chrysanthemum Throne to his son, which meant that the young child received the succession. Shortly thereafter, Emperor Yōzei is said to have formally acceded to the throne.

- referring to the whole with the name of a part, such as "Chrysanthemum Throne" for the serial symbols and ceremonies of enthronement—as in:

20 January 877 (Gangyō 1, on the 3rd day of the 1st month) Yōzei was formally installed on the Chrysanthemum Throne; and the beginning of a new nengō was proclaimed.

- referring to the general with the specific, such as "Chrysanthemum Throne" for Emperorship or senso—as in:

Before Emperor Yōzei ascended the Chrysanthemum Throne, his personal name (his imina) was Sadakira Shinnō (貞明親王).

- referring to the specific with the general, such as "Chrysanthemum Throne" for the short reign of Emperor Yōzei or equally as well for the ambit of the Imperial system.

During the 2007 state visit by the Emperor and Empress of Japan to the United Kingdom, the Times reported that "last night’s dinner was as informal as it could get when the House of Windsor entertains the Chrysanthemum Throne."

== See also ==
- Order of the Chrysanthemum
- List of Emperors of Japan
- Imperial Regalia of Japan
- National seals of Japan
- Imperial House of Japan
- National emblem
  - Dragon Throne of the Emperors of China
  - Throne of England and the Kings of England
  - Phoenix Throne of the Kings of Korea
  - Lion Throne of the Dalai Lama of Tibet
  - Peacock Throne of the Mughal Empire (India)
  - Sun Throne of the Persian Empire and Iran
  - Silver Throne – the Throne of Sweden
  - Lion Throne of Burma
