= Phoenix Throne =

Throne of the Korean monarch

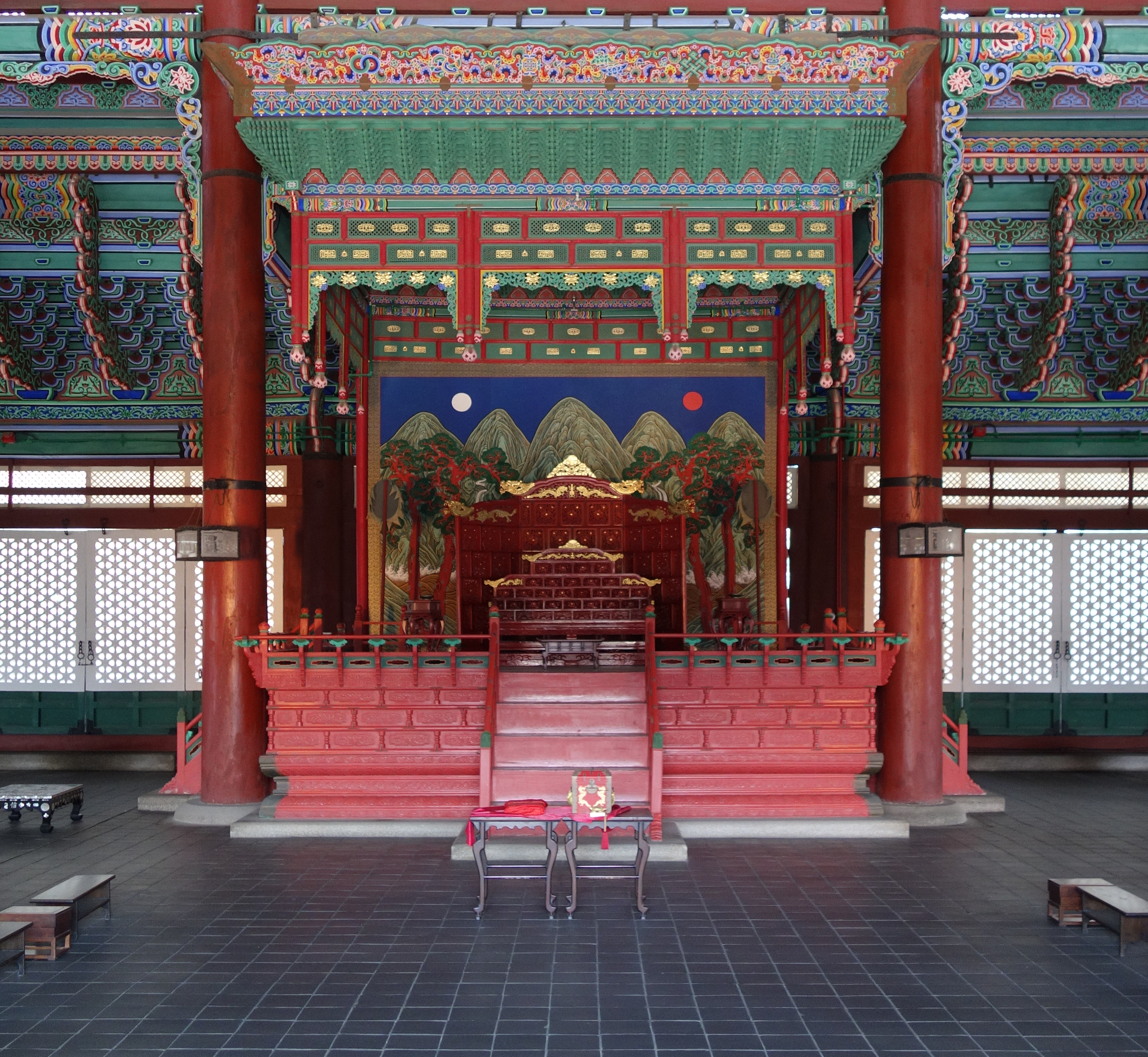
- The central feature of Geunjeongjeon in Gyeongbokgung is the elevated Phoenix throne.

Korean name
- Hangul: 어좌; 옥좌; 보좌
- Hanja: 御座; 玉座; 寶座
- RR: eojwa; okjwa; bojwa
- MR: ŏjwa; okchwa; pojwa

The Phoenix Throne (Korean: 어좌; Hanja: 御座) is the term used to identify the throne of the hereditary monarchs of Korea. In an abstract sense, the Phoenix Throne also refers rhetorically to the head of state of the Joseon dynasty (1392–1897) and the Empire of Korea (1897–1910).

The phoenix motif (Note: The connection with Korea's history was acknowledged when the phoenix was incorporated in the modern State Seal of the Republic of Korea (guksae 국새, 國璽)-- see "Three-Legged Bird to Replace Phoenix on State Seal," Chosun Ilbo (Seoul). January 16, 2006.) symbolizes the king's supreme authority. The phoenix has a long association with Korean royalty — for example, in Goguryeo tomb murals like that of the Middle Gangseo Tumulus where the painted image of a phoenix is featured.

== History ==
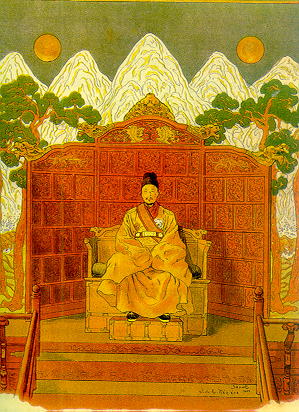
The portrait of Emperor Gojong enthroned. Lithograph by Joseph de la Nezière, 1903.

Enthronement ceremonies and the throne itself has evolved across the span of Korean history. For example, from 1399 to 1549, seven of twelve kings were enthroned in the royal throne hall (Geunjeongjeon) at the palace Gyeongbokgung. In other words, Jeongjong, Sejong, Danjong, Sejo, Seongjong, Jungjong, and Myeongjong ascended the Phoenix Throne in the same royal location.

== Rhetorical usage ==
This flexible English term is also a rhetorical trope. Depending on context, the Phoenix Throne can be construed as a metonymy, which is a rhetorical device for an allusion relying on proximity or correspondence, as for example referring to actions of the monarch or as "actions of the Phoenix Throne."

The Phoenix Throne is also understood as a synecdoche, which is related to metonymy and metaphor in suggesting a play on words by identifying a closely related conceptualization, e.g.,

- referring to the whole with the name of a part, such as "Phoenix Throne" for the serial symbols and ceremonies of enthronement

- " ... Yi Bang-won ... ascended the Phoenix Throne as King Taejong in 1400."
- "In 1776, Prince Sado's second son ascended the Phoenix Throne as King Jeongjo "

- referring to the general with the specific, such as "Phoenix Throne" for kingship—as in:

- "... T'aejo mounted the phoenix throne in Kaesŏng as the first ruler of Chosŏn."

== See also ==
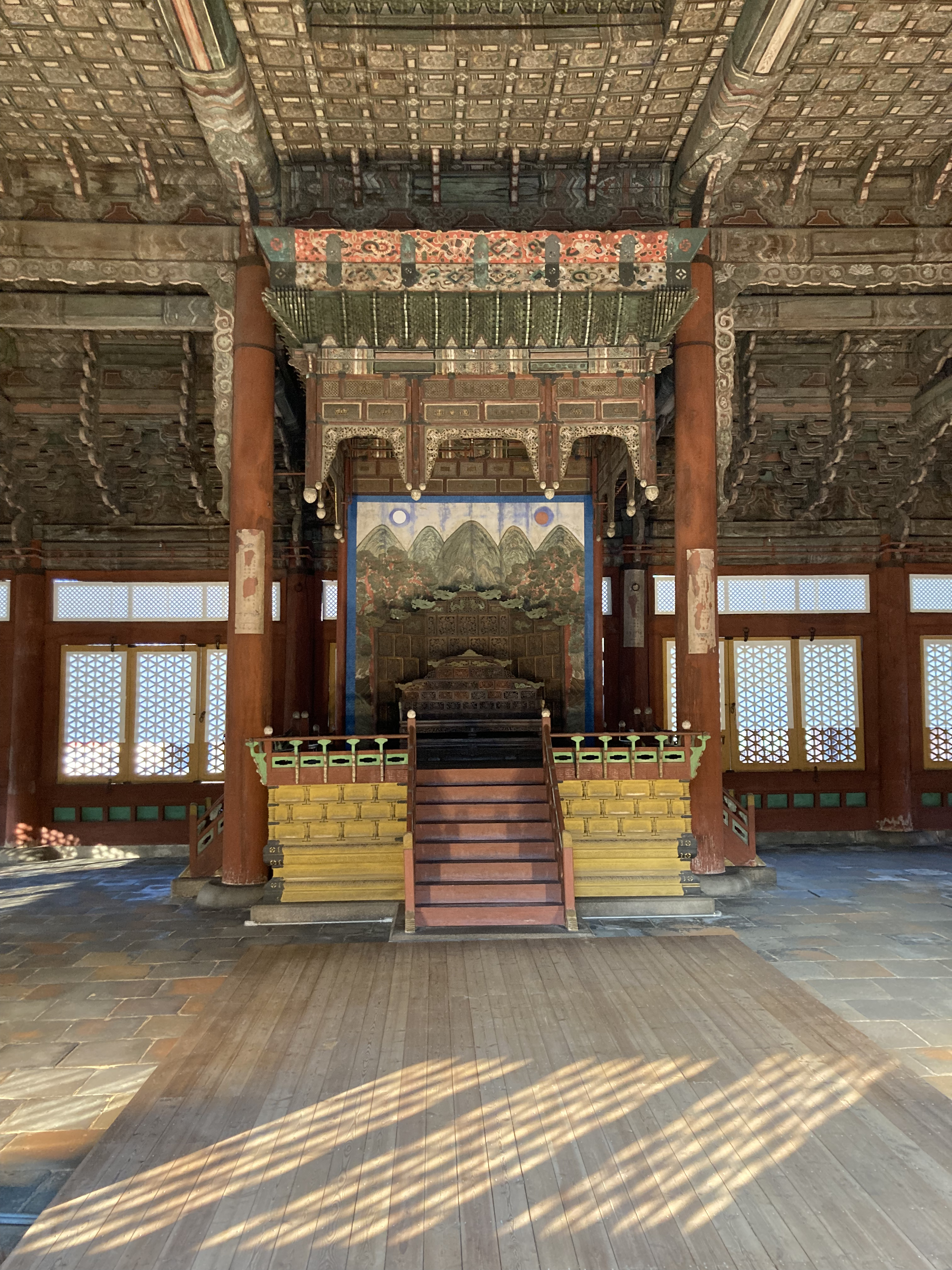
Phoenix Throne at Deoksugung Palace Junghwajeon Hall.

- List of monarchs of Korea
- Irworobongdo
- National emblem
  - Chrysanthemum Throne of the Emperors of Japan
  - The Lion Throne of Myanmar
  - Dragon Throne of the Emperors of China
  - Lion Throne of the Dalai Lama of Tibet
  - Naderi Throne in Iran
  - Peacock Throne of the Mughal Empire
  - Peacock Throne of the Persian Empire
  - Silver Throne - the Throne of Sweden
  - Throne of England and the Kings of England
