= Golden Throne =

Golden Throne may refer to:

- Golden Throne (Mysore)
- Golden Throne (mountain), a rock formation in Utah, USA
- A name given to the mountain Baltoro Kangri by European explorers
- The official throne for the king of Bhutan
- The seat of the Emperor of Mankind in the Warhammer 40,000 fictional universe
