= Utensil =

Utensil may refer to:

- Kitchen utensil, one of the tools of cooking and baking – cookware and bakeware
- Eating utensil, a tool for shaping and carrying food to the mouth
- A tool, serving a set purpose
- Dragon Throne, also called the "divine utensil" – the rhetorical seat of power in the Empire of China (221 BC – 1912)
- Royal Utensils, associated with the quintet of Royal Regalia in Thailand
