= Throne =

Seat of state of a potentate or dignitary

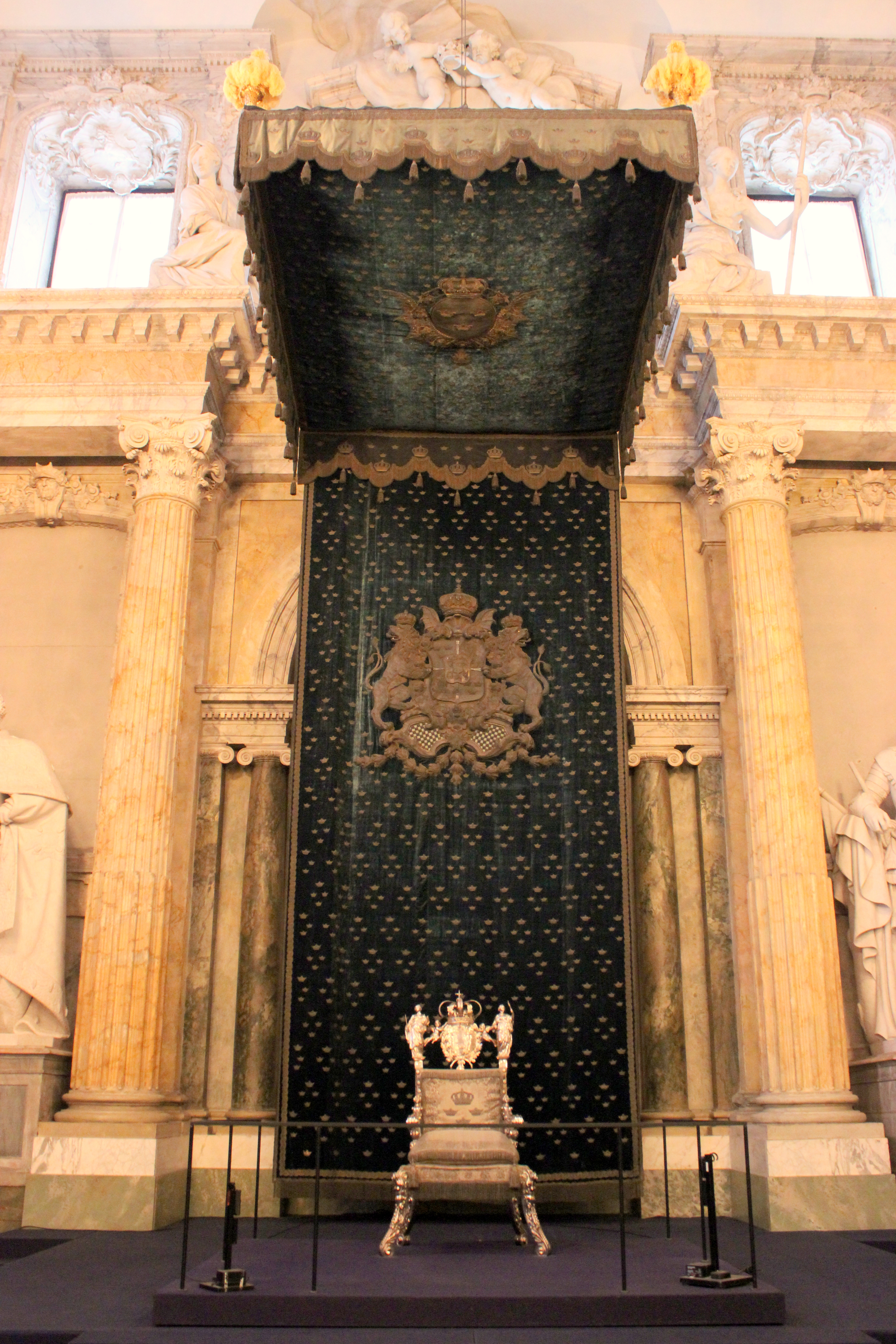
The Silver Throne of Sweden, inside Stockholm Palace, on a dais under a baldachin

A throne is the seat of state of a potentate or dignitary, especially the seat occupied by a sovereign (or viceroy) on state occasions; or the seat occupied by a pope or bishop on ceremonial occasions. "Throne" in an abstract sense can also refer to the monarchy itself, an instance of metonymy, and is also used in many expressions such as "the power behind the throne".

A throne is a symbol of divine and secular rule and the establishment of a throne as a defining sign of the claim to power and authority. It can be with a high backrest and feature heraldic animals or other decorations as adornment and as a sign of power and strength. A throne can be placed underneath a canopy or baldachin. The throne can stand on steps or a dais and is thus always elevated. The expression "ascend (mount) the throne" takes its meaning from the steps leading up to the dais or platform, on which the throne is placed, being formerly comprised in the word's significance. Coats of arms or insignia can feature on throne or canopy and represent the dynasty. Even in the physical absence of the ruler an empty throne can symbolise the everlasting presence of the monarchical authority.

When used in a political or governmental sense, a throne typically exists in a civilization, nation, tribe, or other politically designated group that is organized or governed under a monarchical system. Throughout much of human history societies have been governed under monarchical systems, in the beginning as autocratic systems and later evolved in most cases as constitutional monarchies within liberal democratic systems, resulting in a wide variety of thrones that have been used by given heads of state. These have ranged from stools in places such as in Africa to ornate chairs and bench-like designs in Europe and Asia, respectively. Often, but not always, a throne is tied to a philosophical or religious ideology held by the nation or people in question, which serves a dual role in unifying the people under the reigning monarch and connecting the monarch upon the throne to their predecessors, who sat upon the throne previously. Accordingly, many thrones are typically held to have been constructed or fabricated out of rare or hard to find materials that may be valuable or important to the land in question. Depending on the size of the throne in question it may be large and ornately designed as an emplaced instrument of a nation's power, or it may be a symbolic chair with little or no precious materials incorporated into the design.

When used in a religious sense, throne can refer to one of two distinct uses. The first use derives from the practice in churches of having a bishop or higher-ranking religious official (archbishop, pope, etc.) sit on a special chair which in church referred to by written sources as a "throne", or "cathedra" (Latin for 'chair') and is intended to allow such high-ranking religious officials a place to sit in their place of worship. The other use for throne refers to a belief among many of the world's monotheistic and polytheistic religions that the deity or deities that they worship are seated on a throne. Such beliefs go back to ancient times, and can be seen in surviving artwork and texts which discuss the idea of ancient gods (such as the Twelve Olympians) seated on thrones. In the major Abrahamic religions of Judaism, Christianity, and Islam, the Throne of Yahweh is attested to in religious scriptures and teachings, although the origin, nature, and idea of the Throne of Yahweh in these religions differs according to the given religious ideology practiced.

== Antiquity ==
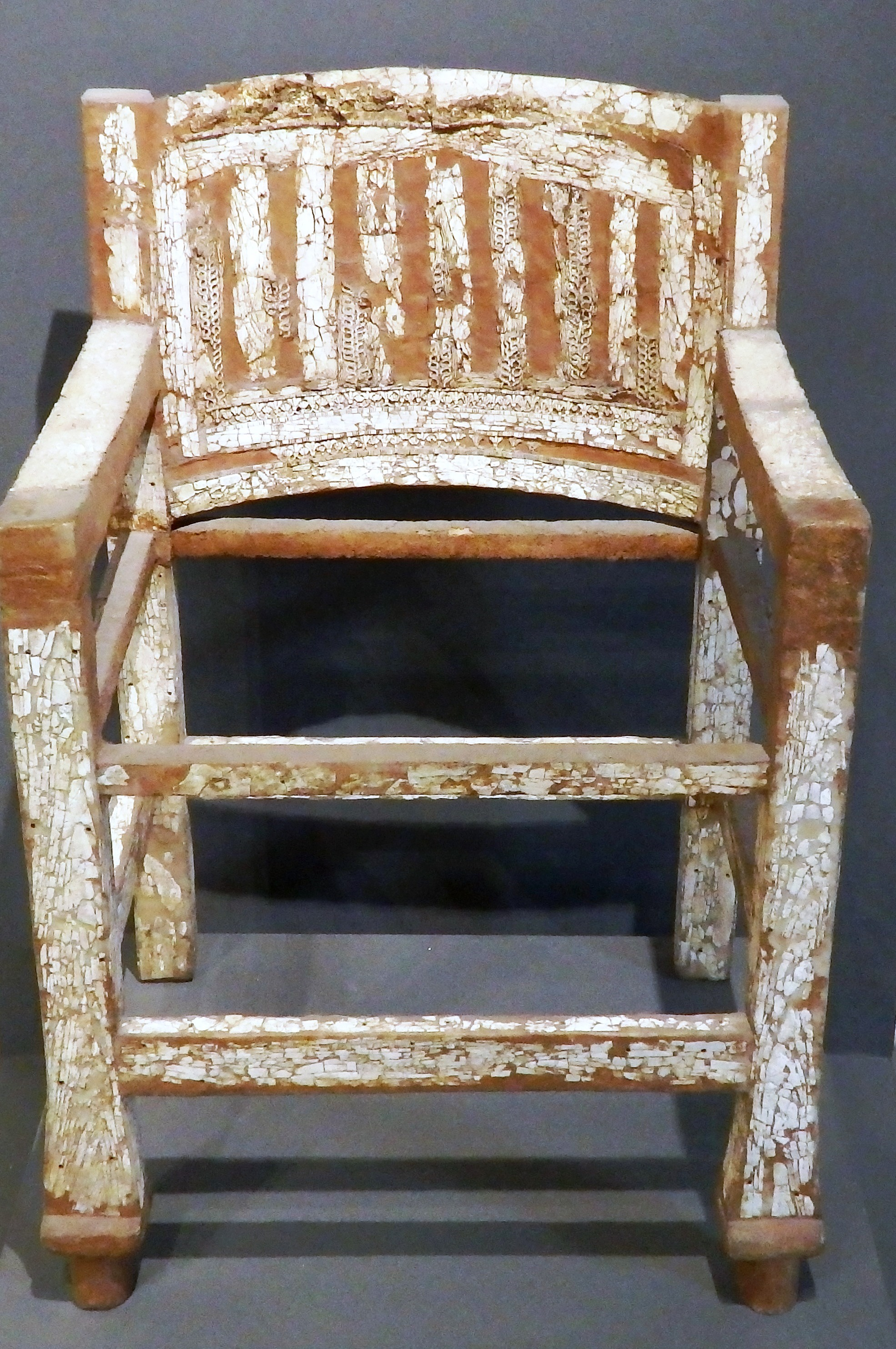
Wooden throne with ivory plaques, Salamis, Cyprus, late 8th century BC, Cyprus Museum

Thrones were found throughout the canon of ancient furniture. The depiction of monarchs and deities as seated on chairs is a common topos in the iconography of the Ancient Near East.

The word throne itself is from Greek θρόνος (thronos) 'seat, chair', in origin a derivation from the Proto-Indo-European verbal root *dʰer- 'to support' (also in Sanskrit dharma 'post, sacrificial pole'). Ancient Greek Διὸς θρόνους (Dios thronous) was a term for the "support of the heavens", i.e. the axis mundi, which term when Zeus became an anthropomorphic god was imagined as the "seat of Zeus". In Ancient Greek, a "thronos" was a specific but ordinary type of chair with a footstool, a high status object but not necessarily with any connotations of power. The Achaeans (according to Homer) were known to place additional, empty thrones in the royal palaces and temples so that the gods could be seated when they wished to be. The most famous of these thrones was the throne of Apollo in Amyclae.

The Romans also had two types of thrones—one for the emperor and one for the goddess Roma whose statues were seated upon thrones, which became centers of worship.

=== Persia ===
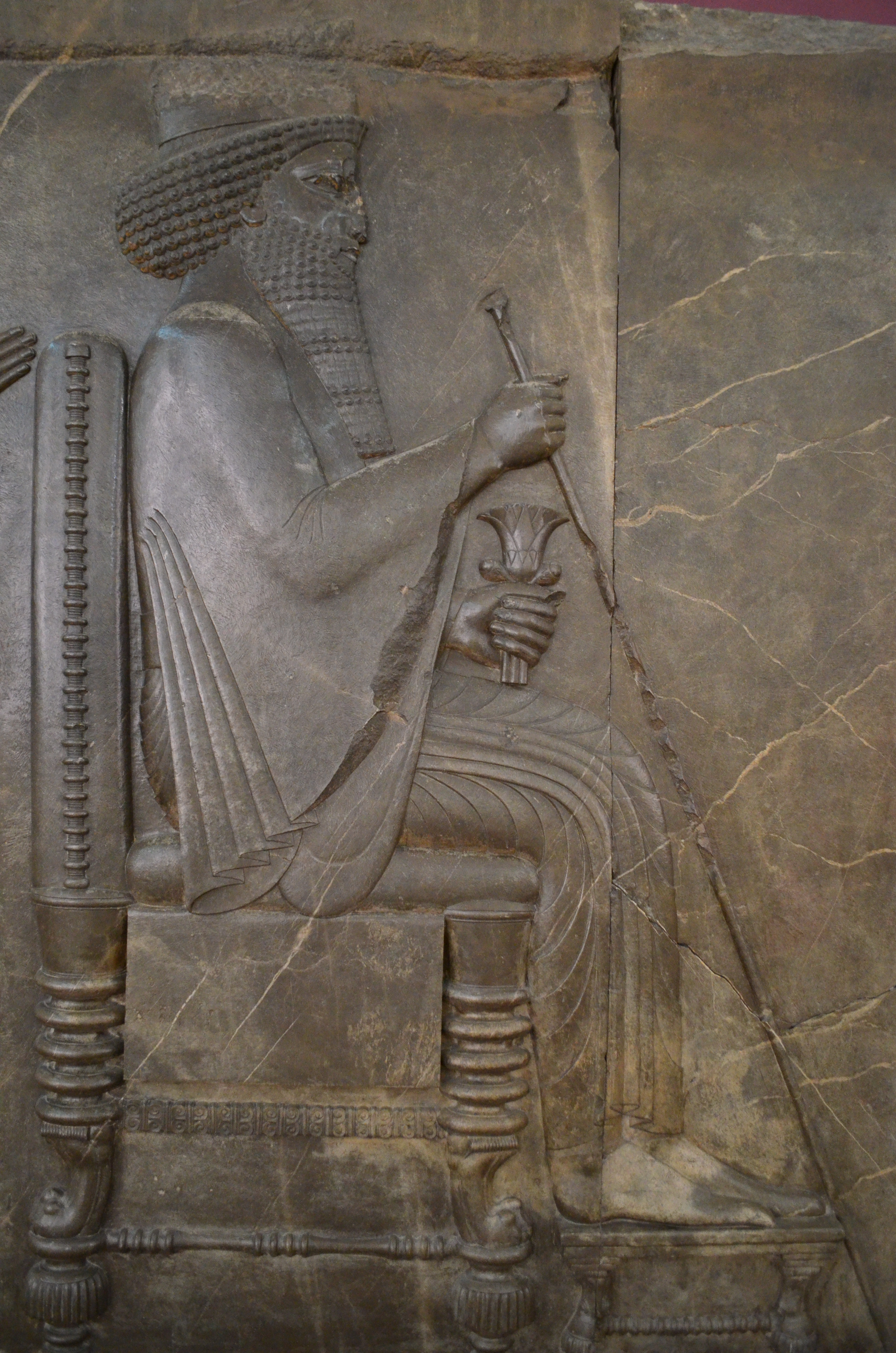
Stone relief depicting Xerxes the Great seated on a throne

In Persia, the traditional name of the throne is the Takht-e Padeshah. From the Achaemenid era to the last Iranian dynasty, the Pahlavi dynasty, the throne was used for sitting shahs.

=== Hebrew Bible ===
The word "throne" in English translations of the Bible renders Biblical Hebrew: כסא, romanized: kissē. The Pharaoh of the Exodus is described as sitting on a throne (Exodus 11:5, 12:29), but primarily the term refers to the throne of the United Kingdom of Israel, often called the "throne of David" or "throne of Solomon". The literal throne of Solomon is described in 1 Kings 10:18-20. In the Book of Esther 5:3, the same word refers to the throne of Ahasuerus. Yahweh is frequently described as sitting on a throne, referred to outside of the Bible as the Throne of God as well as in the Psalms.

In the Middle Ages, the "Throne of Solomon" was associated with Mary, mother of Jesus, who was depicted as the throne upon which Jesus sat. The ivory in the biblical description of the Throne of Solomon was interpreted as representing purity, the gold representing divinity, and the six steps of the throne stood for the six virtues. Psalm 45:9 was also interpreted as referring to the Virgin Mary, with the entire Psalm describing a royal throne room.

== Ecclesiastical ==
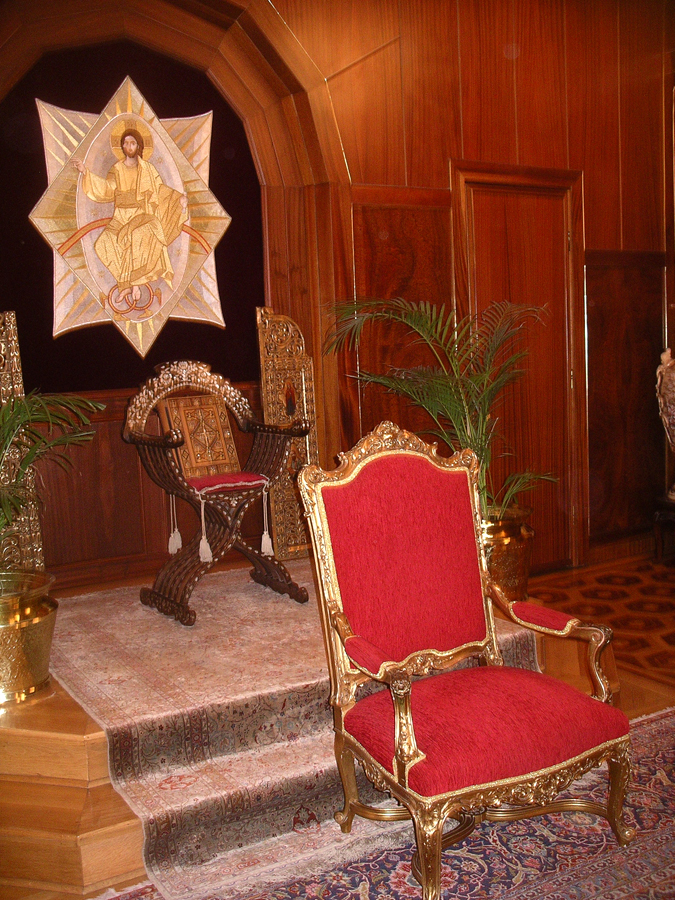
Throne of the ecumenical patriarch of Constantinople in the Fener, Istanbul. On the dais, the Gospel Book is enthroned on a curule chair; in front of it, lower down is the patriarch's throne.

From ancient times, bishops where episcopal offices exist have been formally seated on a throne called a cathedra (Greek: κάθεδρα, seat). Traditionally located in the sanctuary, the cathedra symbolizes the bishop's authority to teach the faith and to govern his flock. This is the origin of the expression "ex cathedra", which refers to the explicative authority, notably the extremely rarely used procedure required for a papal declaration to be 'infallible' under Catholic canon law. In several languages, the word deriving from cathedra is commonly used for an academic teaching mandate, the professorial chair.

From the presence of this cathedra (throne), which can be as elaborate and precious as fits a secular prince (even if the prelate is not a prince of the church in the secular sense), a bishop's primary church is called a cathedral. In the Roman Catholic Church, a basilica—from the Greek basilikos 'royal'—now refers to the presence there of a papal baldachin, a kind of umbraculum, part of his regalia and insignia, and applies mainly to many cathedrals and Catholic churches of similar importance or splendor. In classical antiquity a basilica was secular public hall. Thus, the term basilica may also refer to a church designed after the manner of the ancient Roman basilica. Many of the churches built by the emperor Constantine the Great and Justinian I are of the basilica style.

Some other prelates besides bishops are permitted the use of thrones, such as abbots and abbesses. These are often simpler than the thrones used by bishops and there may be restrictions on the style and ornamentation used on them, according to the regulations and traditions of the particular denomination.

As a mark of distinction, Catholic bishops and higher prelates have a right to a canopy above their thrones at certain ecclesiastical functions. It is sometimes granted by special privilege to prelates inferior to bishops, but always with limitations as to the days on which it may be used and the character of its ornamentation. The liturgical color of the canopy should correspond with that of the other vestments. When ruling monarchs attend services, they are also allowed to be seated on a throne that is covered by a canopy, but their seats must be outside the sanctuary.

In the Greek Orthodox Church, the bishop's throne will often combine features of the kathisma (monastic choir stall) with appurtenances inherited from the Byzantine court, such as a pair of lions seated at the foot of the throne.

The term "throne" is often used to designate the ecclesiastical authority of patriarchs; for instance, "the Ecumenical Throne" refers to the authority of the Ecumenical Patriarch of Constantinople.

Western bishops may also use a faldstool to fulfill the liturgical purpose of the cathedra when not in their own cathedral.

=== Papal ===
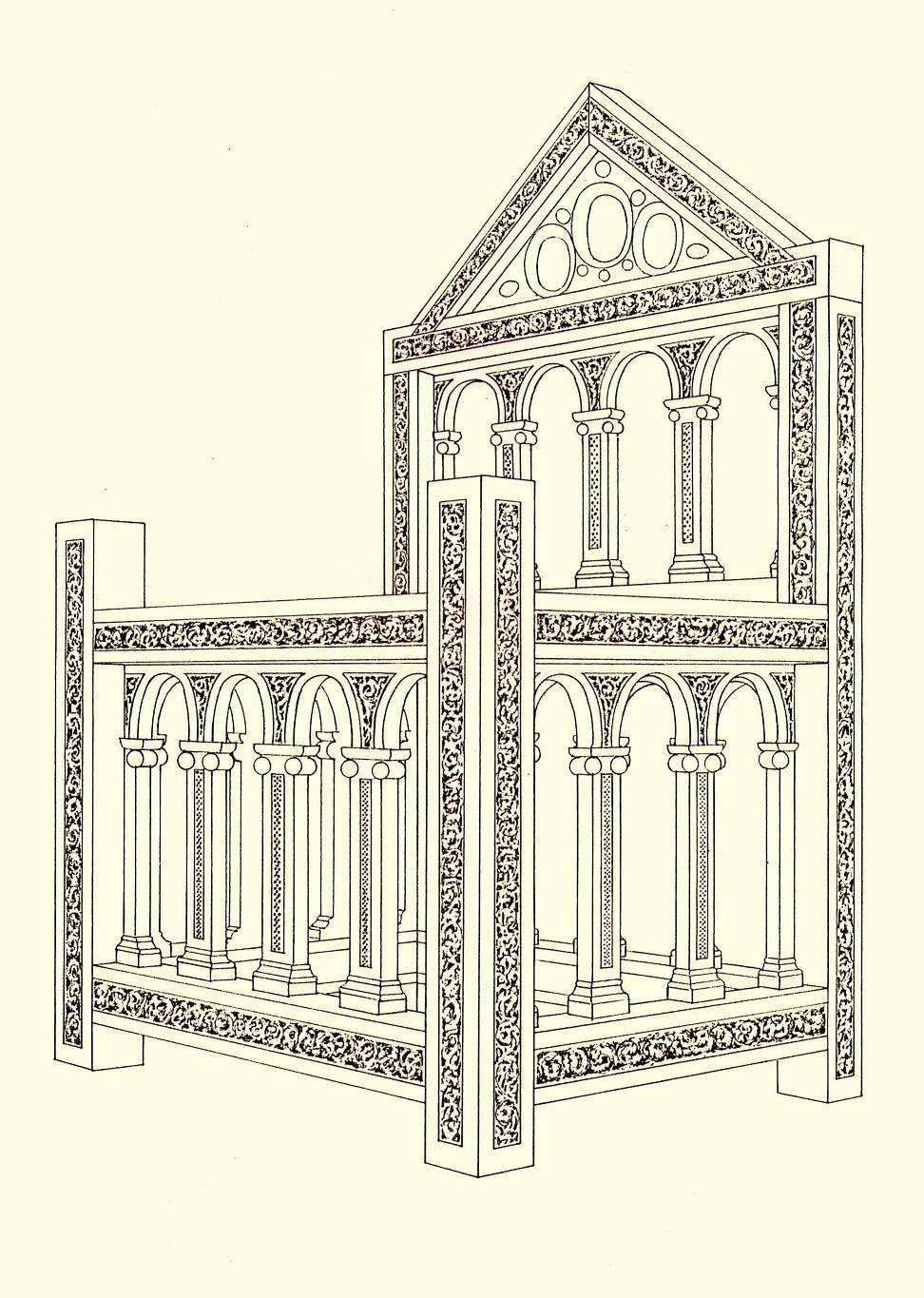
Drawing of the Cathedra Sancti Petri, in St. Peter's Basilica, Vatican City

In the Roman Catholic Church, the pope is an elected monarch, both under canon law as supreme head of the church, and under international law as the head of state—styled "sovereign pontiff"—of the Vatican City State (the sovereign state within the city of Rome established by the 1929 Lateran Treaty). Until 1870, the pope was the elected monarch of the Papal States, which for centuries constituted one of the largest political powers on the divided Italian Peninsula. To this day, the Holy See maintains officially recognised diplomatic status, and papal nuncios and legates are deputed on diplomatic missions throughout the world.

The pope's throne (Cathedra Romana) is located in the apse of the Archbasilica of St. John Lateran, his cathedral as Bishop of Rome.

In the apse of St. Peter's Basilica, above the "Altar of the Chair" lies the Cathedra Petri, a throne believed to have been used by St Peter himself and other earlier popes; this relic is enclosed in a gilt bronze casting and forms part of a huge monument designed by Gian Lorenzo Bernini.

Unlike at his cathedral (Archbasilica of St. John Lateran), there is no permanent cathedra for the pope in St Peter's Basilica, so a removable throne is placed in the basilica for the pope's use whenever he presides over a liturgical ceremony. Prior to the liturgical reforms that occurred in the wake of the Second Vatican Council, a huge removable canopied throne was placed above an equally removable dais in the choir side of the "Altar of the Confession" (the high altar above the tomb of St Peter and beneath the monumental bronze St. Peter's Baldachin); this throne stood between the apse and the Altar of the Confession.

This practice has fallen out of use with the 1960s and 1970s reform of Papal liturgy and, whenever the pope celebrates Mass in St. Peter's Basilica, a simpler portable throne is now placed on platform in front of the Altar of the Confession. Whenever Pope Benedict XVI celebrated the Liturgy of the Hours at St Peter's, a more elaborate removable throne was placed on a dais to the side of the Altar of the Chair. When the pope celebrates Mass on the basilica steps facing St. Peter's Square, portable thrones are also used.

In the past, the pope was also carried on occasions in a portable throne, called the sedia gestatoria. Originally, the sedia was used as part of the elaborate procession surrounding papal ceremonies that was believed to be the most direct heir of pharaonic splendor, and included a pair of flabella (fans made from ostrich feathers) to either side. Pope John Paul I at first abandoned the use of these implements, but later in his brief reign began to use the sedia so that he could be seen more easily by the crowds. The use of the sedia was abandoned by Pope John Paul II in favor of the so-called "popemobile" when outside. Near the end of his pontificate, Pope John Paul II had a specially constructed throne on wheels that could be used inside.

Prior to 1978, at the papal conclave, each cardinal was seated on a throne in the Sistine Chapel during the balloting. Each throne had a canopy over it. After a successful election, once the new pope accepted election and decided by what name he would be known, the cardinals would all lower their canopies, leaving only the canopy over the newly elected pope. This was the new pope's first throne. This tradition was dramatically portrayed in the 1968 film The Shoes of the Fisherman.

== Medieval and early modern periods ==
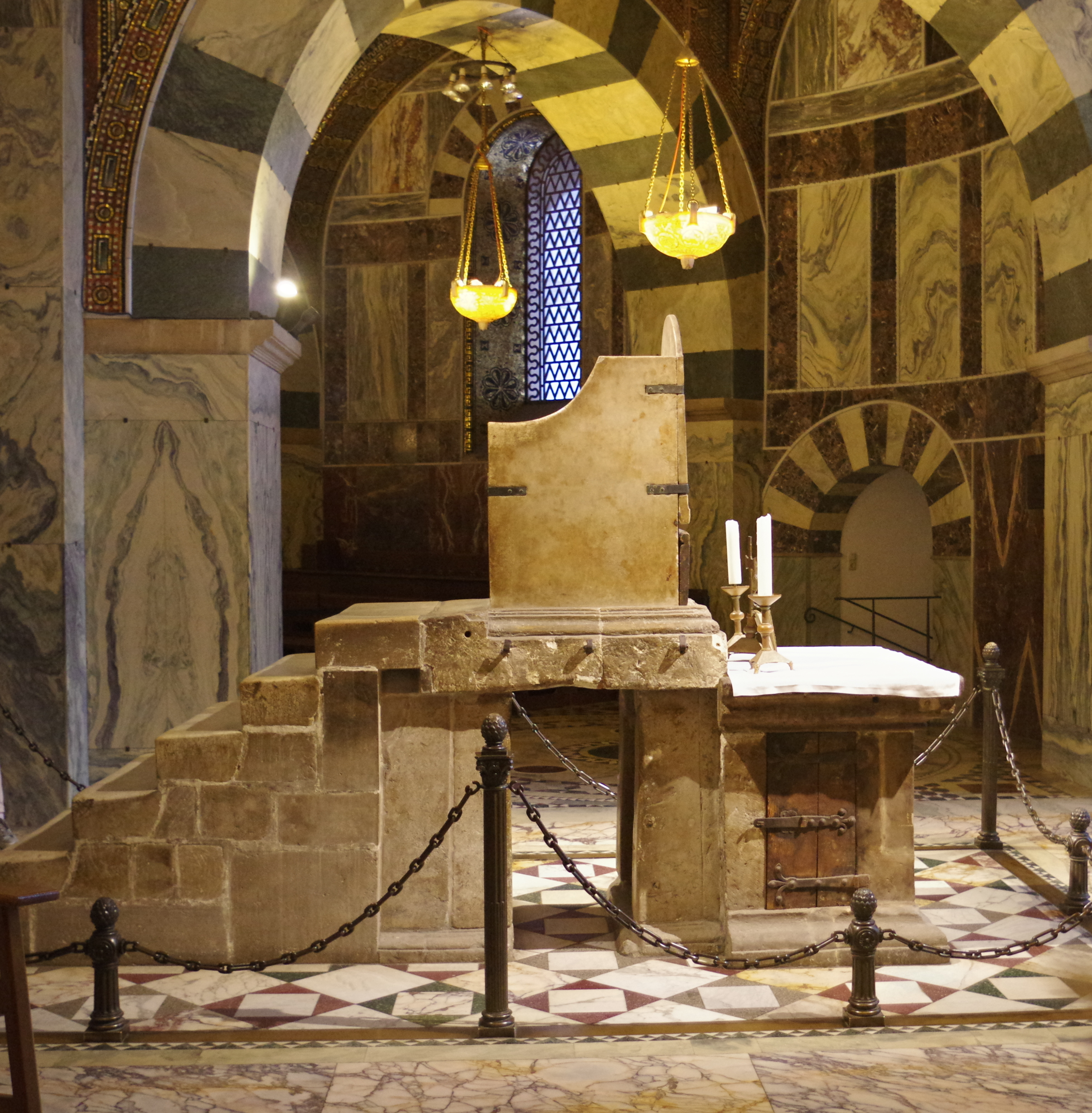
Throne of Charlemagne at Aachen Cathedral (790s)

In European feudal countries, monarchs often were seated on thrones, based in all likelihood on the Roman magisterial chair. These thrones were originally quite simple, especially when compared to their Asian counterparts. In practice, any chair the monarch occupied in a formal setting served as a "throne", though there were often special chairs used only for this purpose, kept in places the monarch often went to. Thrones began to be made in pairs, for the king and queen, which remained common in later periods. Sometimes they are identical, or the queen's throne may be slightly less grand.

The 10th-century throne of the Byzantine emperor, placed in a dedicated throne hall, the Magnaura, included elaborate automatons of singing birds and moving animals.

The 10th-century throne of Ivan "the Terrible" (r. 1533-1584), dating from the mid-16th century, it is a product of West European Renaissance. It is shaped as a high-backed chair with arm rests, and adorned with ivory and walrus bone plaques intricately carved with mythological, heraldic and life scenes. Some carvings, depicting scenes from the biblical account of King David's life, are of particular relevance, as David was seen as the ideal for Christian monarchs.

Although medieval examples tended to be retained in the early modern period, having acquired the aura of tradition, when new thrones were made they either continued medieval styles or were just very grand and elaborate versions of contemporary chairs or armchairs.

== South Asia ==
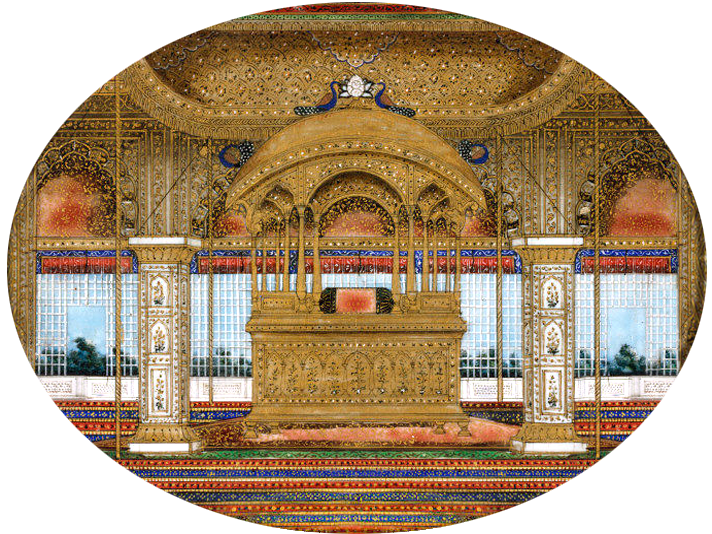
Painting of the (later) Peacock Throne in the Diwan-i-Khas of the Red Fort, around 1850

In the Indian subcontinent, the traditional Sanskrit name for the throne was siṃhāsana (lit., seat of a lion). In the Mughal times the throne was called Shāhī takht ([ˈʃaːhiː ˈtəxt]). The term gadi or gaddi (Hindustani pronunciation: [ˈɡəd̪ːi], also called rājgaddī) referred to a seat with a cushion used as a throne by Indian princes. That term was usually used for the throne of a Hindu princely state's ruler, while among Muslim princes or Nawabs, save exceptions such as the Travancore State royal family, the term musnad ([ˈməsnəd]), also spelt as musnud, was more common, even though both seats were similar.

The Throne of Jahangir was built by Mughal emperor Jahangir in 1602 and is located at the Diwan-i-Khas (hall of private audience) at the Agra Fort.

The Peacock Throne was the seat of the Mughal emperors of India. It was commissioned in the early 17th century by Emperor Shah Jahan and was located in the Red Fort of Delhi. The original throne was subsequently captured and taken as a war trophy in 1739 by the Persian king Nadir Shah and has been lost ever since. A replacement throne based on the original was commissioned afterwards and existed until the Indian Rebellion of 1857.

Maharaja Ranjit Singh's throne was made by the goldsmith Hafez Muhammad Multani about 1820 to 1830. Made of wood and resin core, covered with sheets of repoussé, chased and engraved gold.

The Golden Throne or Chinnada Simhasana or Ratna Simahasana in Kannada is the royal seat of the rulers of the Kingdom of Mysore. The Golden Throne is kept at Mysore Palace.

== Southeast Asia ==
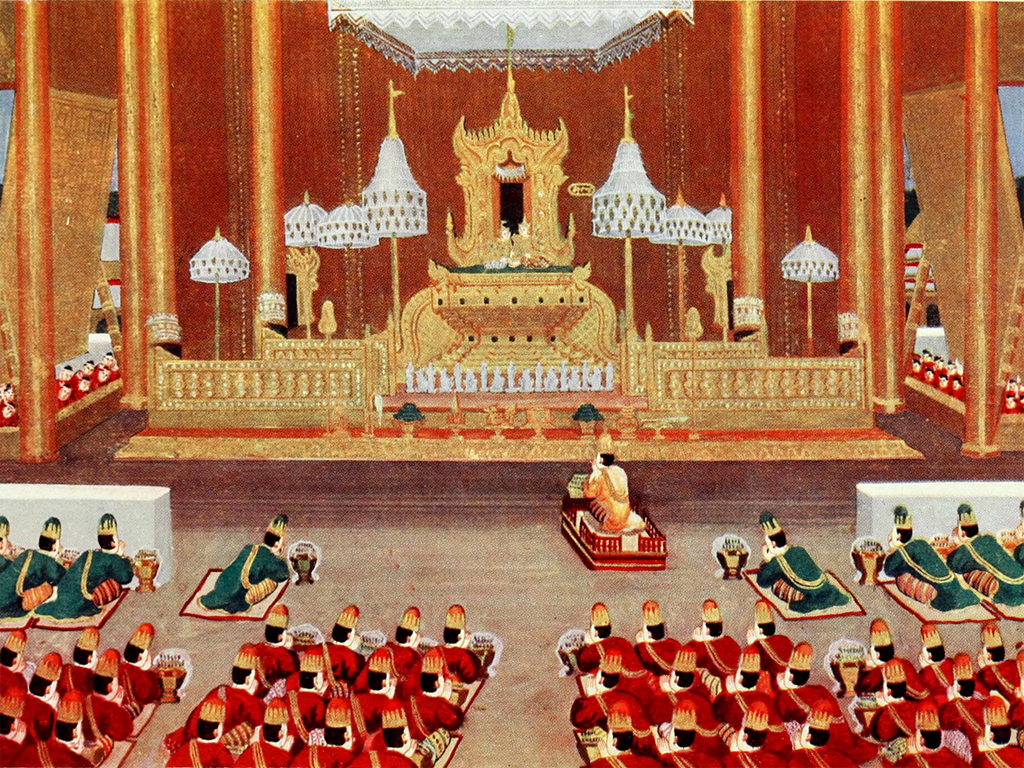
Painting of the Burmese royal throne in the shape of a palin

In Burma, the traditional name for a throne is palin, from the Pali term pallaṅka, which means "couch" or "sofa." The Burmese palin in pre-colonial times was used to seat the sovereign and his main consort, and is today used to seat religious leaders such as sayadaws, and images of the Buddha. Royal thrones are called yazapalin (ရာဇပလ္လင်), while thrones seating images or statues of the Buddha are called gaw pallin (ဂေါ့ပလ္လင်) or samakhan (စမ္မခဏ်), from the Pali term sammakhaṇḍa.

== East Asia ==
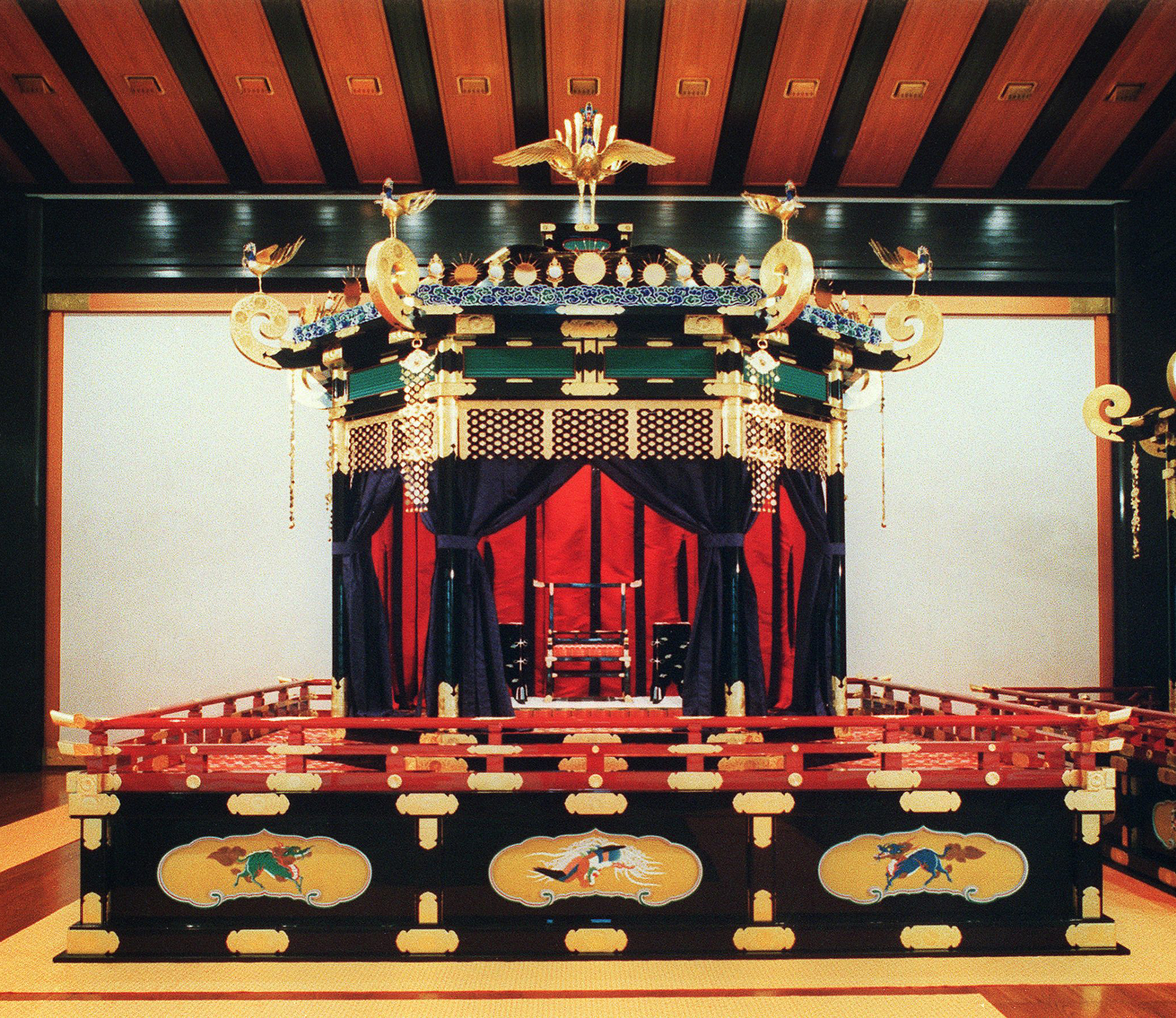
The Takamikura throne kept in the Kyoto Imperial Palace is used for accession ceremonies. The metonym "Chrysanthemum Throne" is also used.

The Dragon Throne is the term used to identify the throne of the emperor of China. As the dragon was the emblem of divine imperial power, the throne of the emperor, who was considered a living god, was known as the Dragon Throne. The term can refer to very specific seating, as in the special seating in various structures in the Forbidden City of Beijing or in the palaces of the Old Summer Palace. In an abstract sense, the "Dragon Throne" also refers rhetorically to the head of state and to the monarchy itself. The Daoguang Emperor is said to have referred to his throne as "the divine utensil."

The throne of the emperors of Vietnam are often referred to as ngai vàng ("golden throne") or ngôi báu (大寳/寶座) literally "great precious" (seat/position). The throne is always adorned with the pattern and motif of the Vietnamese dragon, which is the exclusive and privileged symbol of the Vietnamese emperors. The last existing imperial throne in Vietnam is the throne of the Nguyễn emperors placed in the Hall of Supreme Harmony at the Imperial City of Huế. It is designated as a national treasure of Vietnam. In Vietnamese folk religion, the gods, deities and ancestral spirits are believed to seat figuratively on thrones at places of worship. Therefore, on Vietnamese altars, there are various types of liturgical "throne" often decorated with red paint and golden gilding.

The Phoenix Throne (御座/어좌 eojwa) is the term used to identify the throne of the king of Korea. In an abstract sense, the Phoenix Throne also refers rhetorically to the head of state of the Joseon dynasty (1392–1897) and the Empire of Korea (1897–1910). The throne is located at Gyeongbok Palace in Seoul.

The Chrysanthemum Throne (皇位, kōi; lit. "Imperial position/rank") is the term used to identify the throne of the emperor of Japan. The term also can refer to very specific seating, such as the takamikura (高御座) throne in the Shishin-den at Kyoto Imperial Palace.

The throne of the Ryukyu Kingdom is located in Shuri Castle, Naha.

== Modern period ==
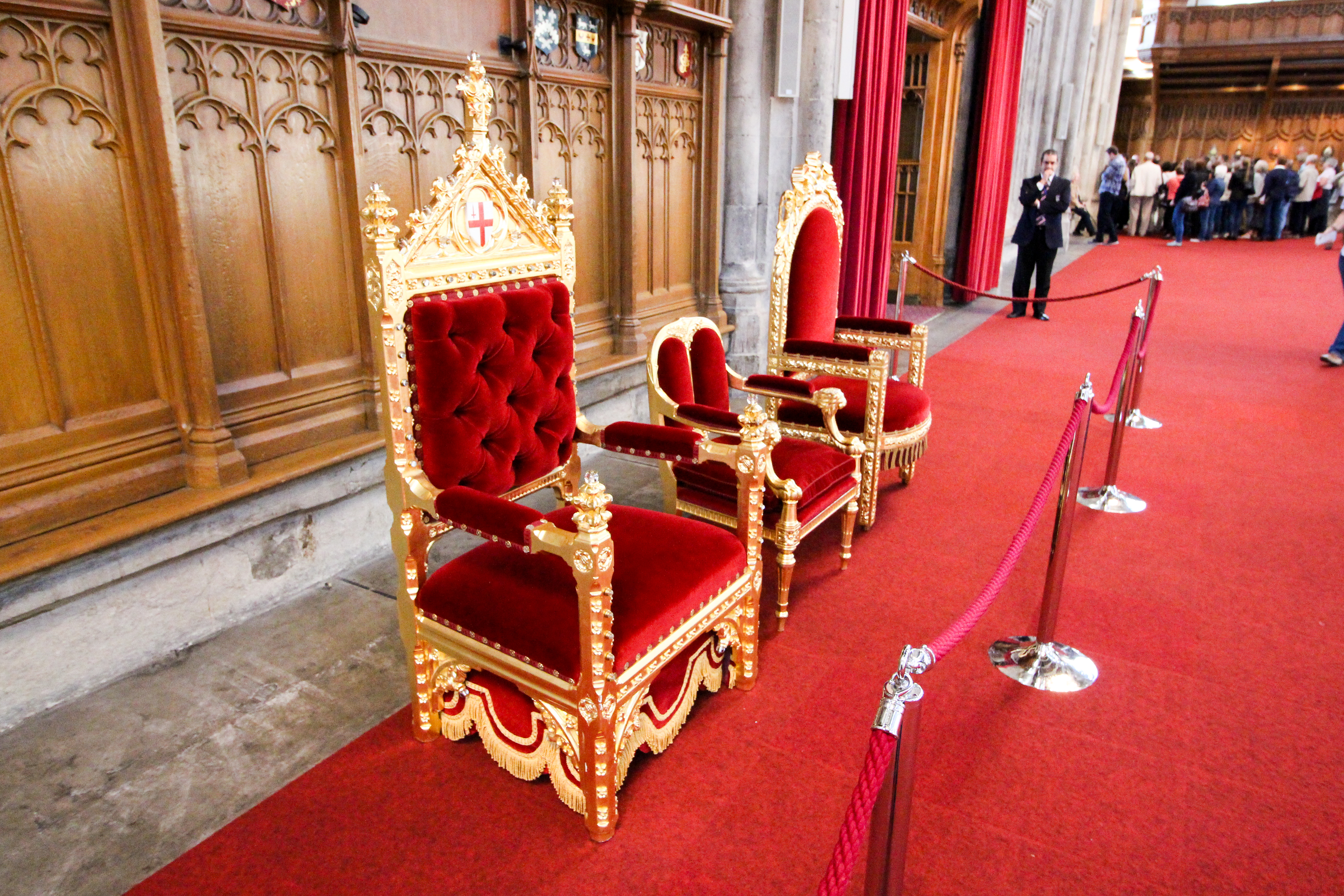
Throne-like chair of the Lord Mayor of London in London's Guildhall

During the Russian Empire, the throne in St. George's Hall (the "Greater Throne Room") in the Winter Palace was regarded as the throne of Russia. It sits atop a seven-stepped dais with a proscenium arch above and the symbol of the imperial family behind (the two-headed eagle). Peter I's Room (the "Smaller Throne Room") is modest in comparison to the former. The throne was made for Empress Anna Ivanovna in London. There is also a throne in the Grand Throne Room of the Peterhof Palace.

In some countries with a monarchy, thrones are still used and have important symbolic and ceremonial meaning. Among the most famous thrones still in usage are St Edward's Chair, on which the British monarch is crowned, and the thrones used by monarchs during the state opening of parliaments in the United Kingdom, the Netherlands, Canada, Australia, and Japan (see above) among others. Thrones are also frequently found in the audience or reception halls of the palaces of reigning or former monarchs. The Naderi Throne of the shahs of Iran was last used in the coronation ceremony of Mohammad Reza Pahlavi in 1967.

Some republics use distinctive throne-like chairs in some state ceremonial. The president of Ireland sits on a former viceregal throne during their inauguration ceremony, while lords mayor and lords provost of many British and Irish cities often preside over local councils from throne-like chairs.

A toilet is often jokingly referred to as "a throne" (namely, the "porcelain throne").

== Examples ==
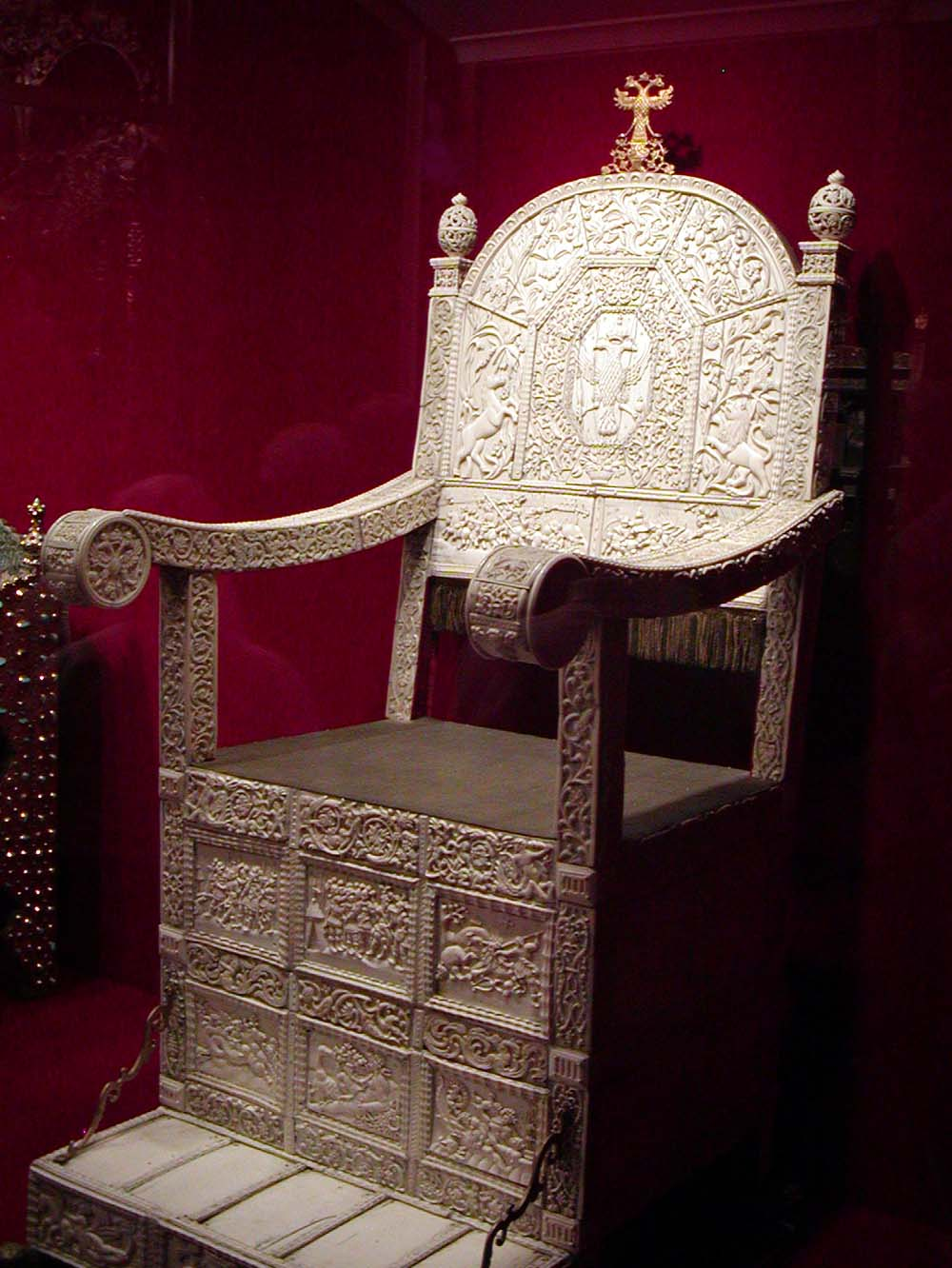
The Ivory Throne of Tsar Ivan IV of Russia.

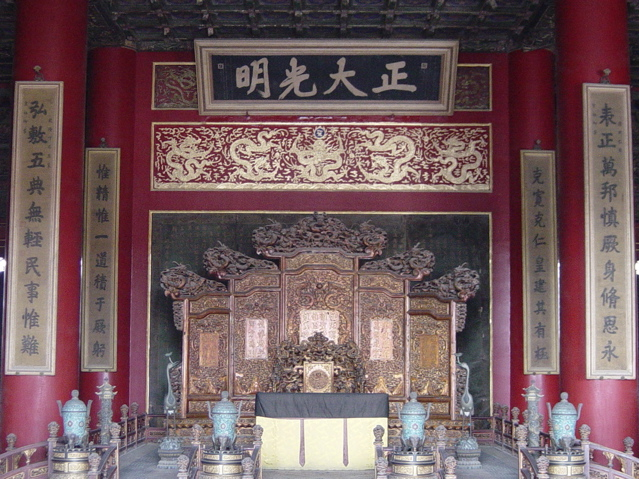
The Dragon Throne of the emperor of China in the Forbidden City in Beijing.

=== Africa ===
- Golden Throne of pharaoh Tutankhamun
- Golden Stool of the Ashanti Empire
- Throne of David of the Emperors of Ethiopia
- Chieftaincy Stools of Nigeria

=== Asia ===
- Dragon Throne of the Emperors of China
- Golden Throne of the Emperors of Vietnam
- Chrysanthemum Throne of the Emperors of Japan (ja:高御座)
- Phoenix Throne of the Kings of Korea
- The Throne of Solomon
- Lion Throne of the Dalai Lama of Tibet
- Lion Throne of Sikkim
- Lion Throne of Konbaung of Burma, (Myanmar)
- Lotus Throne of Konbaung of Burma
- Bumblebee Throne of Konbaung of Burma
- Hamsa Throne of Konbaung of Burma
- Deer Throne of Konbaung of Burma
- Elephant Throne of Konbaung of Burma
- Conch Throne of Konbaung of Burma
- Stone throne of King Kasyapa from Sri Lanka from the 5th century citadel of Sigiri
- Stone throne of King Nissankamalla from Sri Lanka from the 12th century Polonnaruwa kingdom
- Kandian Throne of the Kingdom of Kandy and the Dominion of Ceylon
- Peacock Throne of the Mughal Emperors of India
- Marble Throne, Sun Throne, and Naderi Throne of the shahs of Iran
- Peacock Throne of Korea
- Peacock Throne at Montchobo, then at Ava, ancient capitals of Burma
- Saridhaleys "ivory throne" and the Sighsana "lion throne" of the Maldives sultanate
- Sandalwood throne at Bikaner Fort
- Maharaja Ranjit Singh's throne
- Shivaji's Golden Throne (Suvarna Sinhasan)
- Tupou Throne of the Kingdom of Tonga (Polynesian island country)
- Golden Throne in Mysore India

=== Europe ===
- Throne of Apollo in Amyclae
- The British monarch (and queen consort if applicable) is enthroned in a Throne Chair at their coronation. (Note: St. Edward's Chair in Westminster Abbey is not generally considered to be a throne.)
- Chairing of the Bard in Wales is an ancient ceremonial procedure which dates back to at least 1176, in which the winning poet is chaired Y Prifardd (The Chief Bard) at the National Eisteddfod
- Chair of St Augustine in Canterbury Cathedral, where Archbishops of Canterbury are inaugurated
- Throne of Charlemagne in the cathedral at Aachen, Germany
- Imperial Throne of the medieval German kings and emperors in Goslar, Germany.
- Throne of the King of Aragon, Valencia, Majorca, Sardinia, Corsica and Sicilia and Count of Barcelona Martin I the Elder
- Ivory Throne of Ivan the Terrible
- papal Chair of Saint Peter and sedia gestatoria
- Throne Chair of Denmark, made of narwhal tusks.
  By Wilhelm Bendz (1830)
- Silver Throne in Stockholm Palace, Sweden, on which Swedish monarchs were crowned
- Queen Lovisa Ulrikas throne at Stockholm Palace, Sweden

=== North America ===
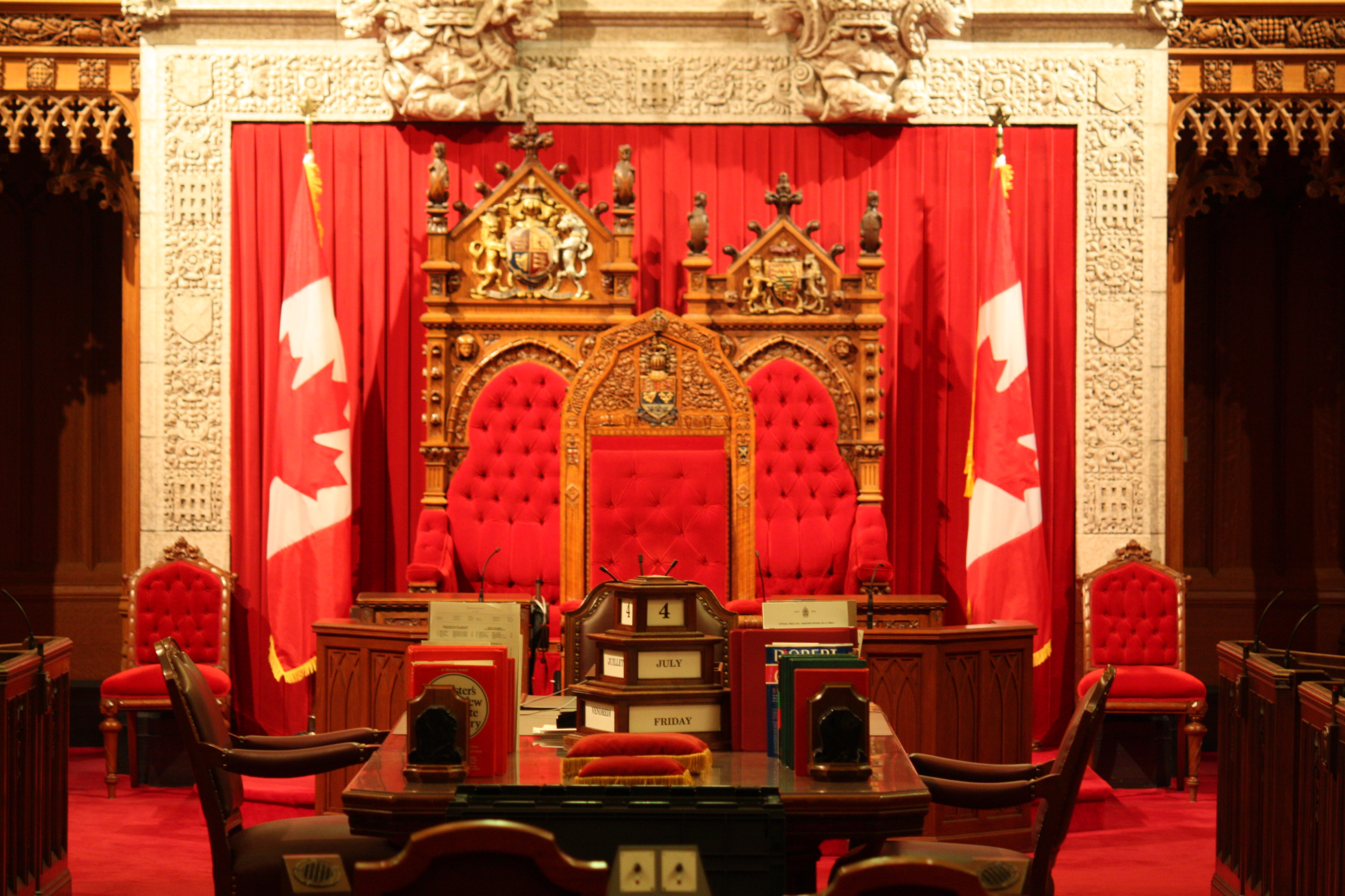
The thrones for the Canadian monarch (back left) and their royal consort (back right) in the Senate of Canada; these may also be occupied by the sovereign's representative, the governor general, and their viceregal consort at the State Opening of Parliament (the speaker's chair is at centre)

- Thrones of Canada for the Canadian monarch and their royal consort or the governor general, representing the monarch, and their viceregal consort.

== See also ==
- Al-Baqara 255 (Verse of the Throne)
- Enthronement
- Speech from the throne
- Throne room
- List of chairs

== Other uses ==
- In music, the stool used to sit behind a drum kit is often called a throne.
- In religion, a niche in an altar piece for displaying the Holy Sacrament is called a throne.
- In slang, a common sit-down toilet is also called a throne, or more formally the 'porcelain throne'.
- One of the Angel choirs is an order called Ophanim or 'Thrones', said to carry God's heavenly throne — other choir names expressing power in secular terms include Powers, Principalities, Dominions.
