= Dragon Throne =

Throne of the Chinese emperor

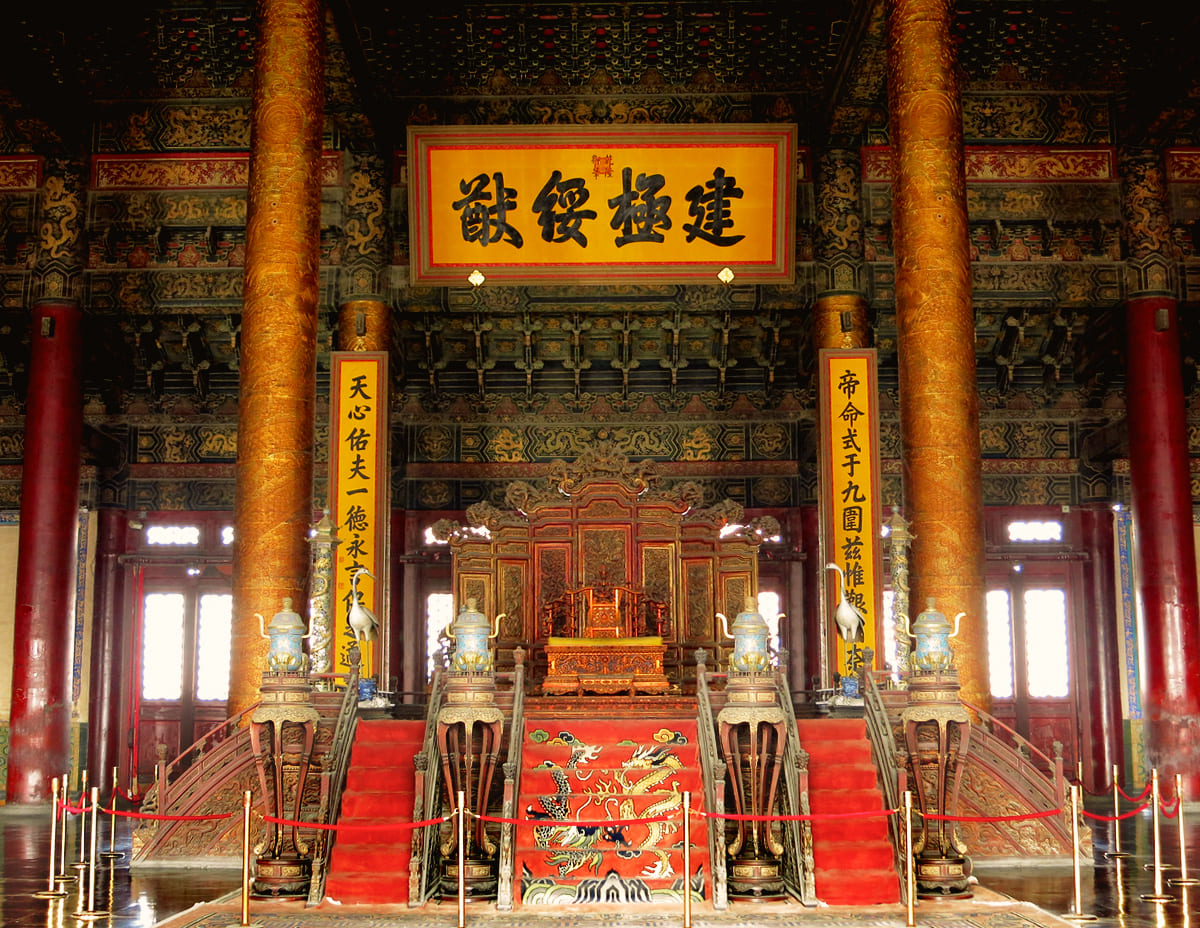
The Dragon Throne of the Emperor of China, pictured here in the Hall of Supreme Harmony, was erected at the center of the Forbidden City, which was itself regarded as the center of the world. The series of gates and passages a visitor had to pass through before reaching the emperor was intended to inspire awe.

The Dragon Throne (simplified Chinese: 龙椅; traditional Chinese: 龍椅; pinyin: lóng yǐ) was the throne of the Emperor of China. As the dragon was the emblem of divine imperial power, the throne of the Emperor was known as the Dragon Throne. The term can refer to very specific seating, as in the special seating in various structures in the Forbidden City of Beijing or in the palaces of the Old Summer Palace. Metonymically, "the Dragon Throne" can also refer to the Chinese sovereign and to the Chinese monarchy itself. The Daoguang Emperor is said to have referred to his throne as "the divine utensil."

"My sacred and indulgent father had, in the year that he began to rule alone, silently settled that the divine utensil (the throne) should devolve on my contemptible person. I, knowing the feebleness of my virtue, at first felt much afraid I should not be competent to the office; but on reflecting that the sages, my ancestors, have left to posterity their plans; that his late majesty has laid the duty on me -— and heaven's throne should not be long vacant -— I have done violence to my feelings, and forced myself to intermit awhile my heartfelt grief, that I may with reverence obey the unalterable decree and on the 27th of the 8th moon (October 3rd), I purpose devoutly to announce the event to heaven, to earth, to my ancestors, and to the gods of the land and of the grain, and shall then sit down on the imperial throne."

== Seat of State ==
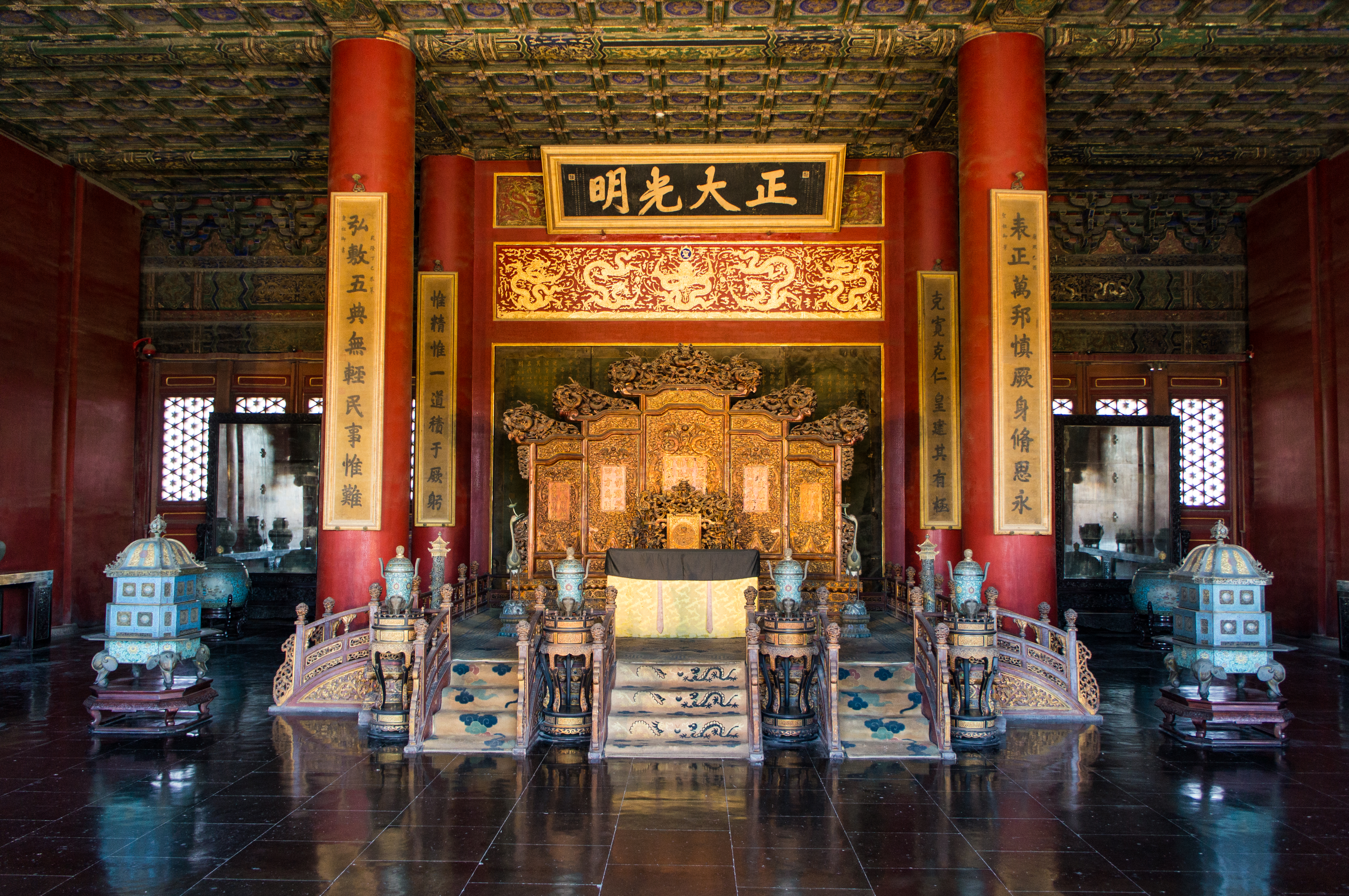
An identical Dragon Throne within the adjacent Palace of Heavenly Purity. The Chinese characters on the board above the throne read 正大光明 (Zheng Da Guang Ming), which has various translations including “Fair-dealing and Upright” or “Just and Honorable”.

The dragon was the chief symbol on the imperial flag and other imperial objects, including the throne or imperial utensil. The dragon was said to have the power to become visible or invisible—in short, the dragon was a factotum in the “divinity business” of the Chinese emperors. The dragon was the imperial crest on royal monuments, and displayed on the Emperor’s robes. The Grand Chair of State was also called the “Dragon Throne.” This is the physical seat of state in the Hall of Supreme Harmony (also known as the “Hall of Highest Peace”). It is a uniquely crafted object which was used only by the Emperor.

When European and American military forces pushed their way into the Peking after the Boxer Rebellion in 1900, they were the first men from the West to appear in the presence of the Dragon Throne since 1795, when Isaac Titsingh and Andreas Everardus van Braam Houckgeest were received with grace and ceremony by the Qianlong Emperor. William Elliot Griffis was among those who actually stood with cameras and notebooks before the Dragon Throne on a sunny September day in 1900, and he described what he saw:

There was the throne itself, a great three-leaved affair. Over the ample seat in the centre, with a high reredos, two great wings spread off from the central division. All was white marble and jade, liberally sculptured according to the canons of Chinese art. Along the top lay and leered dragons, each one "swinging the scaly horror of his folded tail" toward the central seat, his head projecting outward in the air. Below the throne were the three steps, on the broad second one of which the suppliant performed the nine prostrations or knocks of the head.

== History ==
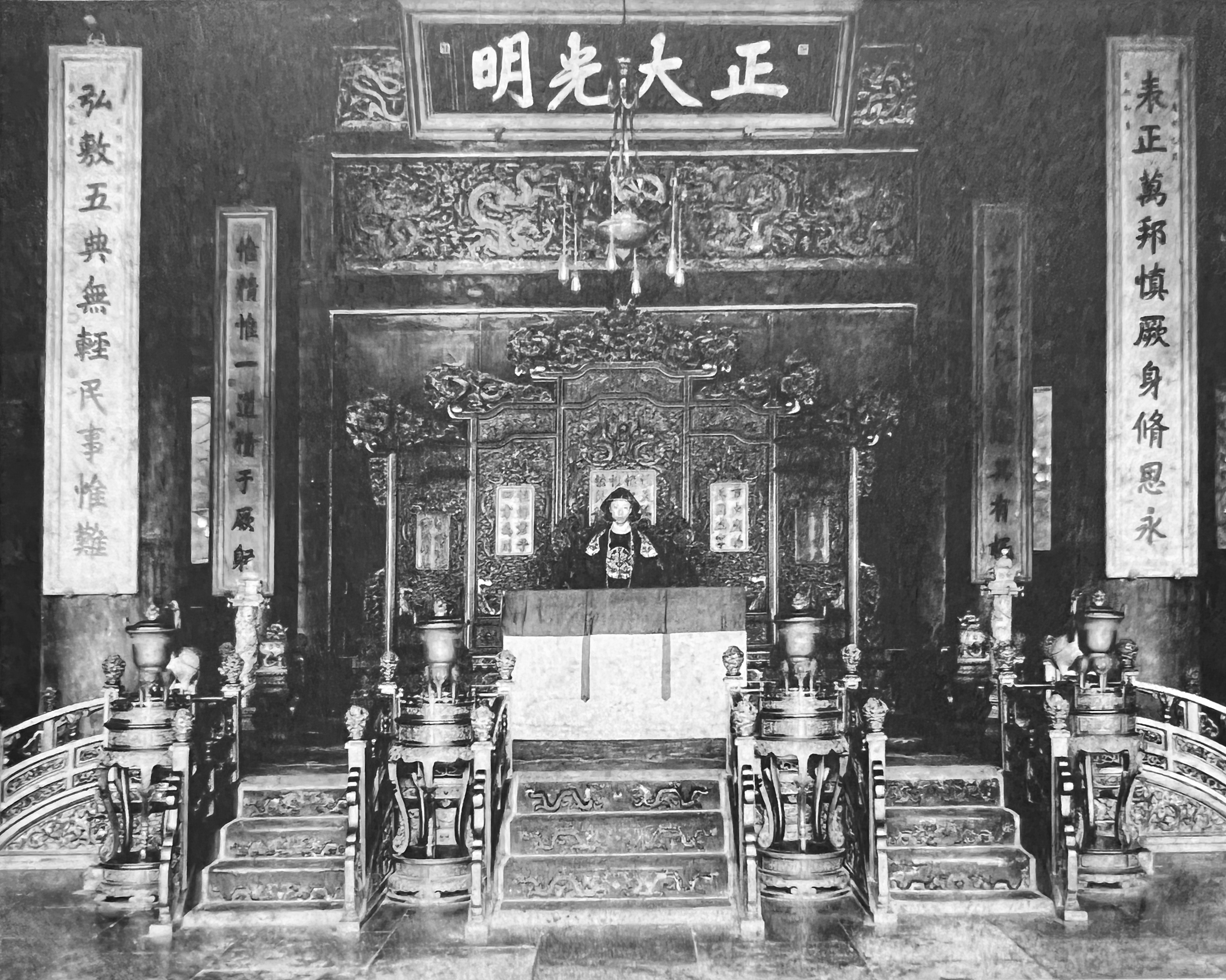
Photograph of the last emperor of China, Puyi, upon the dragon throne in the Palace of Heavenly Purity.

In Imperial China, the seat of power was called the Dragon's Seat or the Dragon Throne. The process of accession, the ceremonies of enthronement and the act being seated on the Dragon's Throne were roughly interchangeable.

The Dragon Throne was an hereditary monarchy in China before 1912. In much the same sense as the British Crown, the Dragon Throne became an abstract metonymic concept which represented the monarch and the legal authority for the existence of the government.

According to tradition, the Chinese Empire began with the Qin dynasty in 221 BC, and the chronology of the emperors continued in unbroken succession until the fall of the Qing dynasty in 1912.

For a short time in 1917, to whatever extent the Chinese emperor was held to be as symbol of the state and its people, the Dragon Throne would have been construed as a symbol of a constitutional monarch.

== Rhetorical usage ==
This flexible English term is also a rhetorical trope. Depending on context, the Dragon Throne can be construed as a metonymy, which is a rhetorical device for an allusion relying on proximity or correspondence, as for example referring to actions of the Emperor or as "actions of the Dragon Throne."

The Dragon Throne is also understood as a synecdoche, which is related to metonymy and metaphor in suggesting a play on words by identifying a closely related conceptualization, e.g.,

- referring to a part with the name of the whole, such as "Dragon Throne" for the mystic process of transferring Imperial authority, e.g.,

In 1368, "[o]ne of the Hongwu Emperor's first acts upon ascending the Dragon Throne was to set up a network to spy on his subordinates and to register the entire population of China for the first time."

- referring to the general with the specific, such as "Dragon Throne" for emperorship (or the supreme autocrat of China) or Imperial China itself, e.g.,

In 1418, "[t]he fleet moored just outside Malindi's coral reefs (off the east coast of what is today known as Kenya). From the belly of the big ships came small rowboats and men in lavish silk robes. And among the faces were some the king recognized. These men he knew. They were his own ambassadors whom he had dispatched months ago on a tribute-bearing mission. Now emissaries of the Dragon Throne were returning them home, and they brought wondrous things to trade. But had so many men and so many ships come in peace or had they come to make the citizens of Malindi subjects of the Son of Heaven?"

- referring to the specific with the general, such as "Dragon Throne" for the long reign of the Qianlong Emperor (r. 1736–1795) or equally as well for the ambit of the Imperial system, e.g.,

In 1921, "... the movement for the restoration of the Throne will eventually have the hearty approval of the vast majority of the people. They will welcome it, not only because the Dragon Throne has been for ages an essential part of the Confucian system, inseparable from the ideas of an agricultural race born and bred on patriarchal Theism, but also because of the callous corruption and disorder with which the present administration has been identified all over the country.

== See also ==
- Chinese sovereign
- Divine right of kings
- Emperor of China
- Mandate of Heaven
- Monarchy of China
- National emblem
  - Throne of England and the Kings of England
  - Chrysanthemum Throne of the Emperors of Japan
  - Phoenix Throne of the Kings of Korea
  - Lion Throne of the Dalai Lama of Tibet
  - Lion Throne of Burma
  - Peacock Throne of the Mughal Empire
  - Peacock Throne of the Persian Empire
  - Sun Throne of the Persian Empire
  - Naderi Throne in Iran
- List of Chinese monarchs
- The Last Emperor

== Notes ==
- This article incorporates text from The Middle kingdom: a survey of the ... Chinese empire and its inhabitants ..., by Samuel Wells Williams, a publication from 1848, now in the public domain in the United States.
- This article incorporates text from Commercial Handbook of China, by Arnold, Julean Herbert, a publication from 1920, now in the public domain in the United States.
- This article incorporates text from The preceptor's assistant, or, Miscellaneous questions in general history, literature, and science, by Williams, David, a publication from 1858, now in the public domain in the United States.
- This article incorporates text from China Through the Stereoscope: A Journey Through the Dragon Empire at the Time of the Boxer Uprising, by Ricalton, James, a publication from 1901, now in the public domain in the United States.
- This article incorporates text from In the Mikado's Service: A Story of Two Battle Summers in China, by Griffis, William Elliot, a publication from 1901, now in the public domain in the United States.
- This article incorporates text from China's Story in Myth, Legend, Art and Annals, by Griffis, William Elliot, a publication from 1911, now in the public domain in the United States.
- This article incorporates text from China, Japan and Korea, by Bland, John, a publication from 1921, now in the public domain in the United States.
- This article incorporates text from Asiatic journal and monthly miscellany, Volume 13, by East India Company, a publication from 1822, now in the public domain in the United States.
