= Lion Throne =

Throne of the Dalai Lama of Tibet

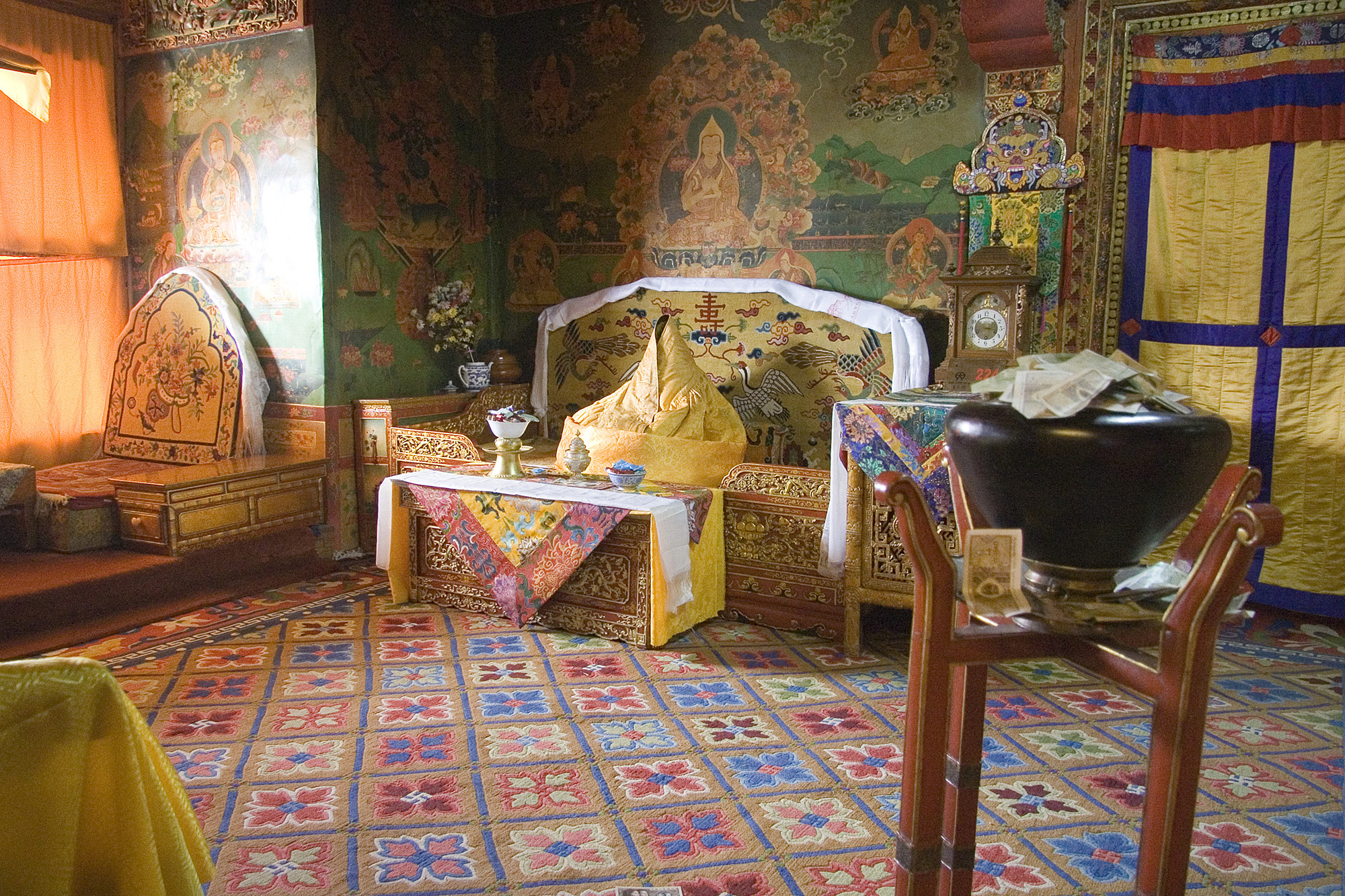
The Lion Throne, within the former quarters of the Dalai Lama. The effigy represents Tenzin Gyatso, the incumbent Dalai Lama. The throne bears the Chinese character 夀, meaning "long life".

The Lion Throne is the English term used to identify the throne of the Dalai Lama of Tibet. It specifically refers to the throne historically used by Dalai Lamas at Potala Palace in Lhasa.

== See also ==
- List of Dalai Lamas
- Tibetan independence movement
- National emblem
  - Dragon Throne of the Emperors of China
  - Throne of England and the Kings of England
  - Chrysanthemum Throne of the Emperors of Japan
  - Phoenix Throne of the Kings of Korea
  - Peacock Throne of the Mughal Empire
  - Sun Throne of the Persian Empire
  - Naderi Throne in Iran
