= Golden Throne (Mysore) =

Royal throne in India

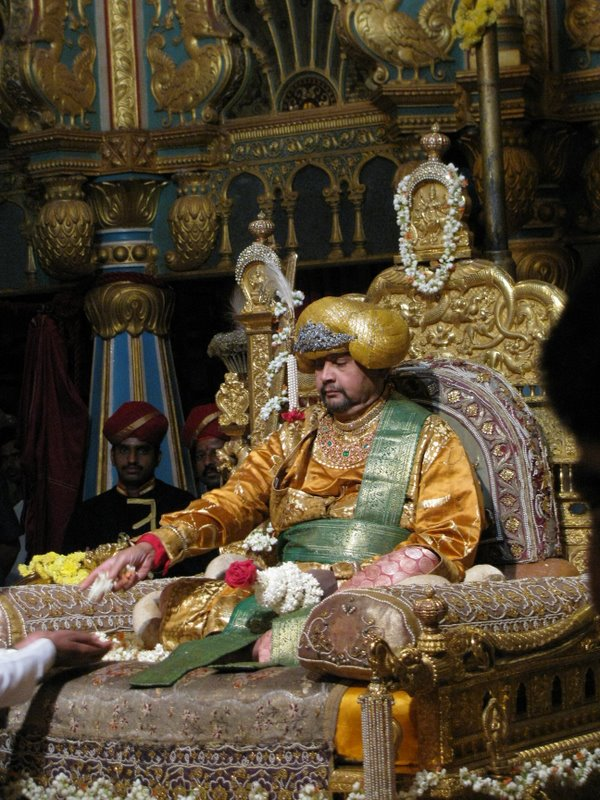
Srikantadatta Narasimharaja Wadiyar, former head of the Royal Family of Mysore, pictured seated upon the Golden Throne

The Golden Throne or Chinnada Simhasana or Ratna Simhasana in Kannada, was the royal throne of the rulers of the Kingdom of Mysore. It is one of the main attraction of Mysore Palace. It is kept for public viewing only during Dasara festival and on the rest of the days, it is disassembled and kept in safe lockers of the palace.

== The Throne ==
The Throne comprises a main seat, steps leading to the main seat, and a golden umbrella over the main seat. The throne is carved out of figwood and decorated with ivory plaques. It was embellished with jewellery, gold, precious stones and silver figurines by "Swarnakala Nipuna" Singannacharya. The balustrades of the steps leading to the seat are embellished with female figures (Salabhanjikeyaru). The four sides of the throne are decorated with creepers. There are elephants on the east, horses on the south, soldiers on the west and chariots on the north. Brahma in the south, Maheshwara in the north and Vishnu in the centre are the trinities. The Royal seat is called the Koormasana (ಕೂರ್ಮಾಸನ), on which cushion and pillows are covered with cloths studded with precious stones. The hand rests are made of half elephant and half lion shaped art. On the back of the seat is the art work of birds lion and flowers. In the centre is Goddess Chamundeshwari, with Goddess Lakshmi and Goddess Saraswati on either sides surrounded by asta dikpalakas (gods of 8 directions). The Royal seat is supported by the horses in jumping pose. The Royal seat is adorned by Lord Brahma on south, Lord Shiva to north and Lord Vishnu at centre. The lions are placed as a mark of victory. On the 3 edges of seat is carvings of 2 horses, 2 tigers and 4 swans The Royal seat. Back rest has the carving of the royal emblem of the Mysore kings Ganda berunda and below it is the quote "Satyamevoodharaham" meaning "I shall uphold the truth always". The Royal seat is 2.25 m in height and on that the Royal umbrella gives shadow to whole royal seat. On the royal umbrella has the words inscribed blessing to the Mysore king. The Royal Umbrella is studded with gems. On the top of the royal umbrella is a celestial bird called Huma, a swan with an emerald gem on its beak. It is believed that on who the shadow of the bird falls, will wear the royal crown always. The below image is the blessing inscription on the Royal Umbrella.

== Engravings ==
The "slokas," which are engraved on the rim of the umbrella, are addressed to Krishnaraja Wadiyar III and refers to his ancestors from whom the throne has come down from generations of kings. A rough translation of a "sloka" describes Krishnaraja Wadiyar as "Lord of the Earth" and son of the illustrious Chamaraja, who is resplendent with the blessings of Goddess Chamundeshwari. "... You are the Lord of Karnataka Ratna Simhasana... and this golden umbrella of the golden throne, which you have inherited from your illustrious ancestors, evokes the awe of the whole world."

== History ==
According to tradition, the throne belonged to the Pandavas of Mahabharata fame and was in Hastinapura. Kampilaraya brought this throne from Hastinapura to Penugonda, now in Andhra Pradesh, where it was kept underground. In 1336 AD, Vidyaranya, the royal preceptor of the Vijayanagar kings, showed the spot where it was buried to Harihara I, one of the founders of the Vijayanagar empire, who retrieved the throne. The throne was then used by the Vijayanagar kings at Anegondi for more than a century and a half. During the early part of the 17th century the Governor of Vijayanagar rulers at Srirangapatna obtained the throne. In 1609, the governor Srirangaraya gave the throne to Raja Wodeyar. In 1610, Raja Wodeyar ascended the throne. Inaugurated the Dasara festivities. Epigraphical evidence shows that this royal throne was in the possession of Chikkadevaraya Wodeyar in 1699.

== Use ==
The golden throne was associated with ceremonies, such as the coronation of the king in the early days and conducting of Dasara Durbar. But now it is just on public display during the Mysore Dasara festival when the Maharaja of Mysore conducts his private Durbar. The throne is under the joint guardianship of the scion and the Mysore Palace Board. During the rest of the year the throne is placed in a high security room. During the Mysuru Dasara, the king was seated upon the throne which in turn was placed upon an elephant to be paraded around Mysuru. In current times, the Utsava Mūrti (festive idol) of Goddess Chamundeshwari is placed on the throne and paraded around Mysuru on the same elephant during Mysuru Dasara.
