= Silver Throne =

Throne used by Swedish monarchs since 1650

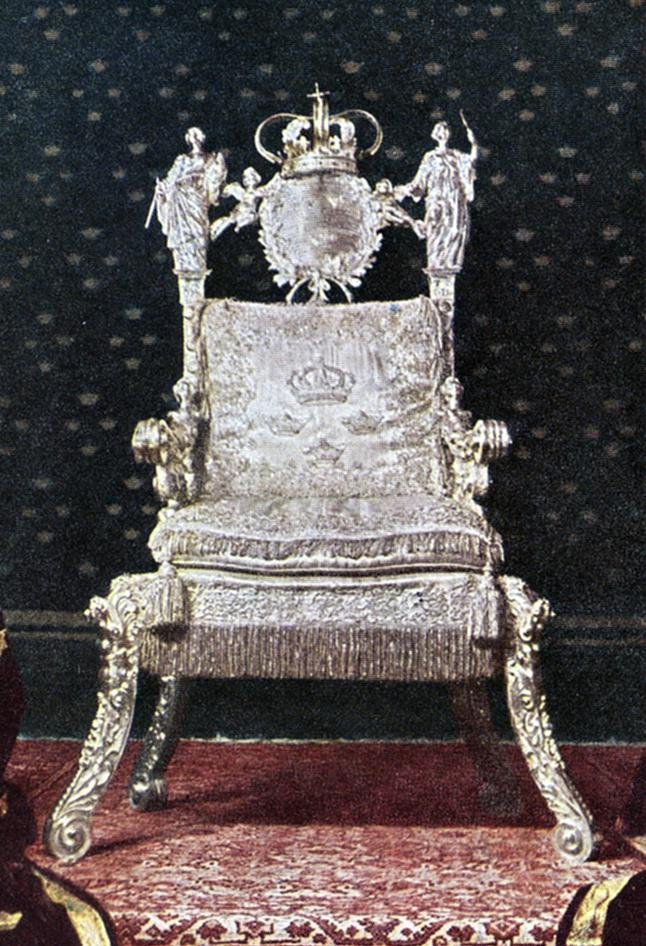
The Silver Throne

The Silver Throne (Swedish: Silvertronen or Drottning Kristinas silvertron) is a throne which has been used by the Swedish monarch at coronations, accessions to the throne and the State Opening of Parliament. The Silver Throne is located in the Hall of State at Stockholm Palace.

The Silver Throne was made for Queen Christina's coronation in 1650. Crafted by Abraham Drentwett in Augsburg, Bavaria, it was a gift from Count Magnus Gabriel De la Gardie. Since coronations stopped being practiced the throne has been used for state openings of parliament (until 1975) and enthronement ceremonies (last for Carl XVI Gustaf in 1973). It was last used in 1974 for the State Opening of Parliament.

The throne took a prominent role in 2023 for a formal portrait of King Carl XVI Gustaf to mark his Golden Jubilee.

On 14 September 2024, a woman was arrested after walking past the cordons around the throne and sitting on it. The woman was arrested on suspicion of vandalism and violation of Sweden’s Protection Act. Initially, there were media reports that the throne had been damaged in the incident, but this was later denied by the Swedish Royal Court.

== Trivia ==
A replica of the throne was made for the Greta Garbo film Queen Christina in 1933, and then also used in the 1989 Batman film as the throne of the Joker.
