= Lion Throne of Burma =

Throne used by Burmese monarchs

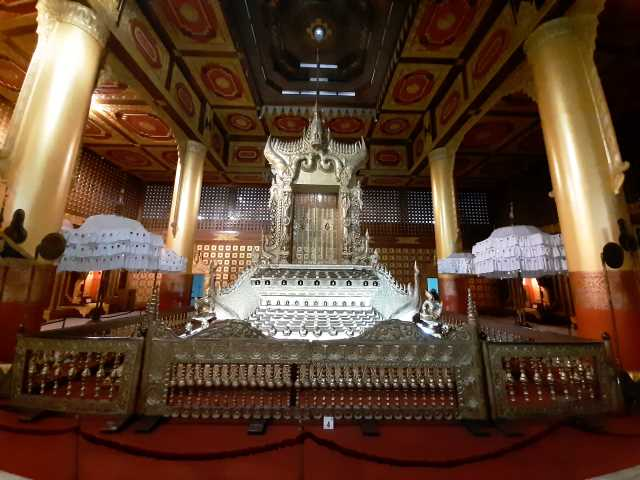
The original Lion Throne at the National Museum in Yangon

The Lion Throne (also known as Sihasana or Thihathana Palin; Burmese: သီဟသနပလ္လင်, derived from Sanskrit: सिंहासन, romanized: siṃhāsana, lit. 'lion's seat, throne') is one of the eight imperial thrones used by the Burmese monarchs. Seven of them were destroyed by fire during the Allied bombing in World War II, but the Lion Throne, the most significant of all, and an imperial symbol, was saved because the throne was transported to India in 1885 after the Third Anglo-Burmese War and remained there for more than 62 years until it was returned to Myanmar in 1948.

== Decorative elements of the throne ==
As small lion figurines are placed inside niches of the throne, it is called the Thihathana Throne or Royal Lion Throne. It is made out of yamane wood (Gmelina arborea). The upper portion of the throne is called "U-gin". There are eleven Chakra and Devas at the both sides of U-gin floral carvings. There are the peacock figurines, which represent the sun, and the hare figurine, which represents the moon, depicted on the proper left and right sides of the door jambs.

It was believed that Burmese kings descended from Solar and Lunar dynasties. There are two guardian gods of the world (Lokanat) figures on each side of the door. By representing the Trāyastriṃśa (the abode of gods), 33 figures of Nats (Devas) are installed at the U-gin, the door and door jamb of the throne. At the left and right sides of the throne, there is each a Lokanat figure, together with a flying lion and a flying elephant, as symbols of peace.

== History and safeguarding of the last Lion Throne ==
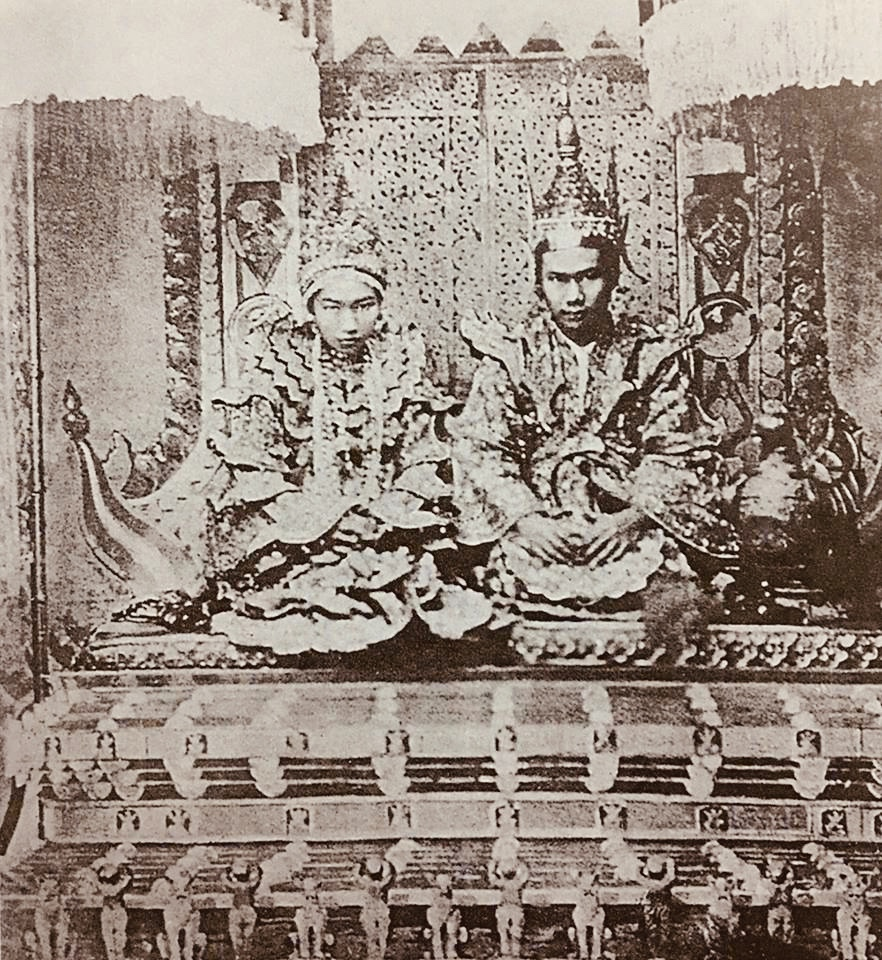
King Thibaw and Queen Supayalat on the Bumblebee Throne at Glass Hall, Mandalay Palace

In total, there were nine thrones of only eight different kinds in the time of the monarchs of Burma. The Lion Throne was used for judicial affairs at the Supreme Court (Hluttaw) of the Myanansankyaw Golden Palace in Yadanabon period (1800s). All of the thrones were constructed during the time of King Bodawpaya (1816) by Shwetaung Nawrahta, the minister of that king, who was in charge of building the palace, including the thrones. There were two Lion Thrones, the original one located at the audience hall and a replica of it, located at the Supreme Court.

After King Thibaw was dethroned in 1885, the Lion Throne was taken by the British to India in 1902, where it was displayed at the Indian Museum, Kolkata. After Burma (now Myanmar) regained independence on January 4, 1948, it was returned by Lord Mountbatten and housed at the presidential residence on Ahlone Road in Rangoon (Now Yangon). On September 12, 1959, the throne was moved to the National Museum for public display, where it remains today.

== Use and protocol ==
The throne was only used three times a year. At the beginning of the Burmese New Year, the beginning and the end of the Buddhist Lent. Whenever a member of the royal court or the royal family wished to hand the king a present, they had to ask permission from the Chief Eunuch and then from the king. When allowed, the giver had to touch the throne with his/her right hand only, as the left hand is thought to be inferior, and the present was given.

== Gallery ==
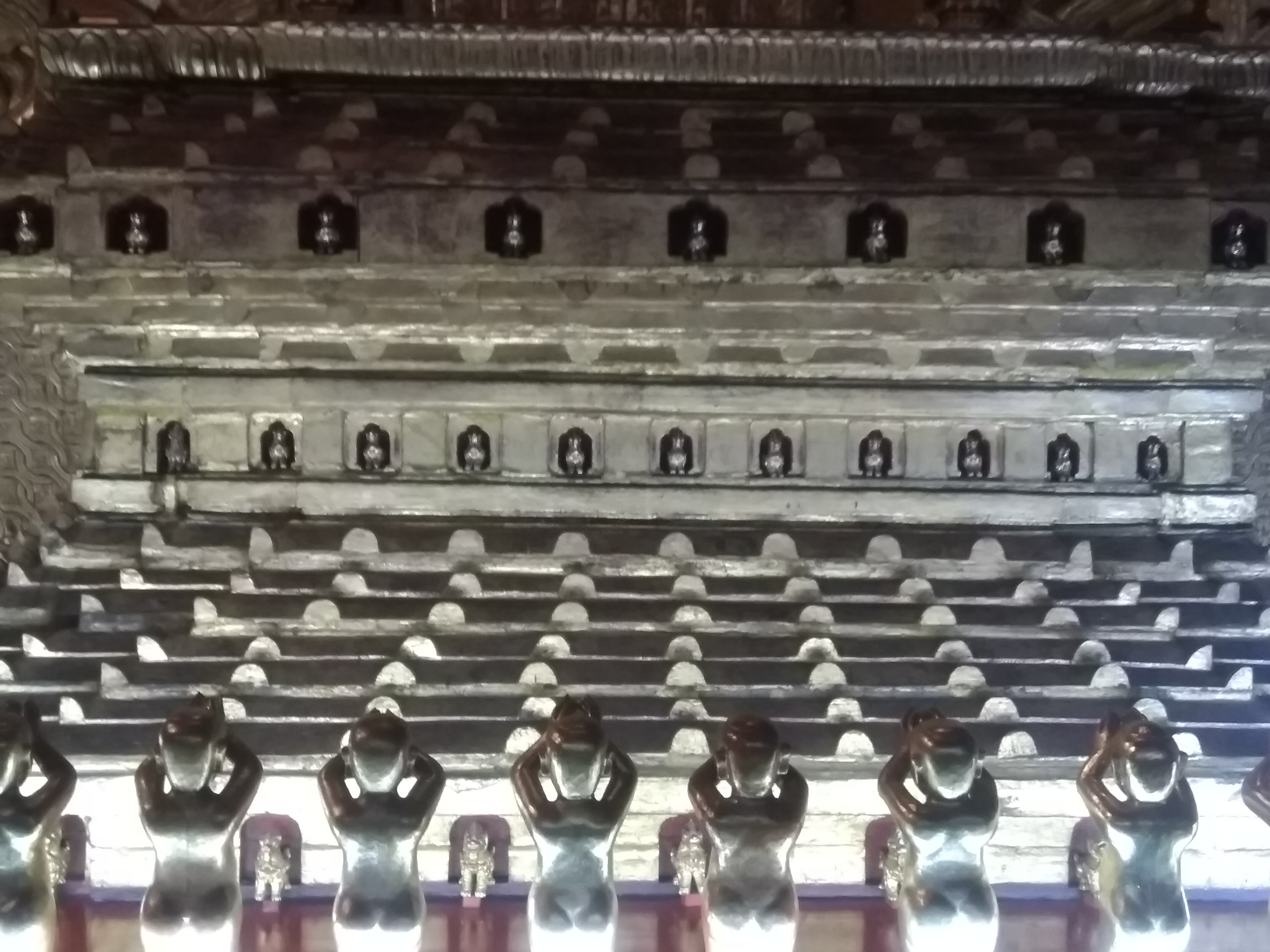
Small lion figurines inside the niches of the throne.

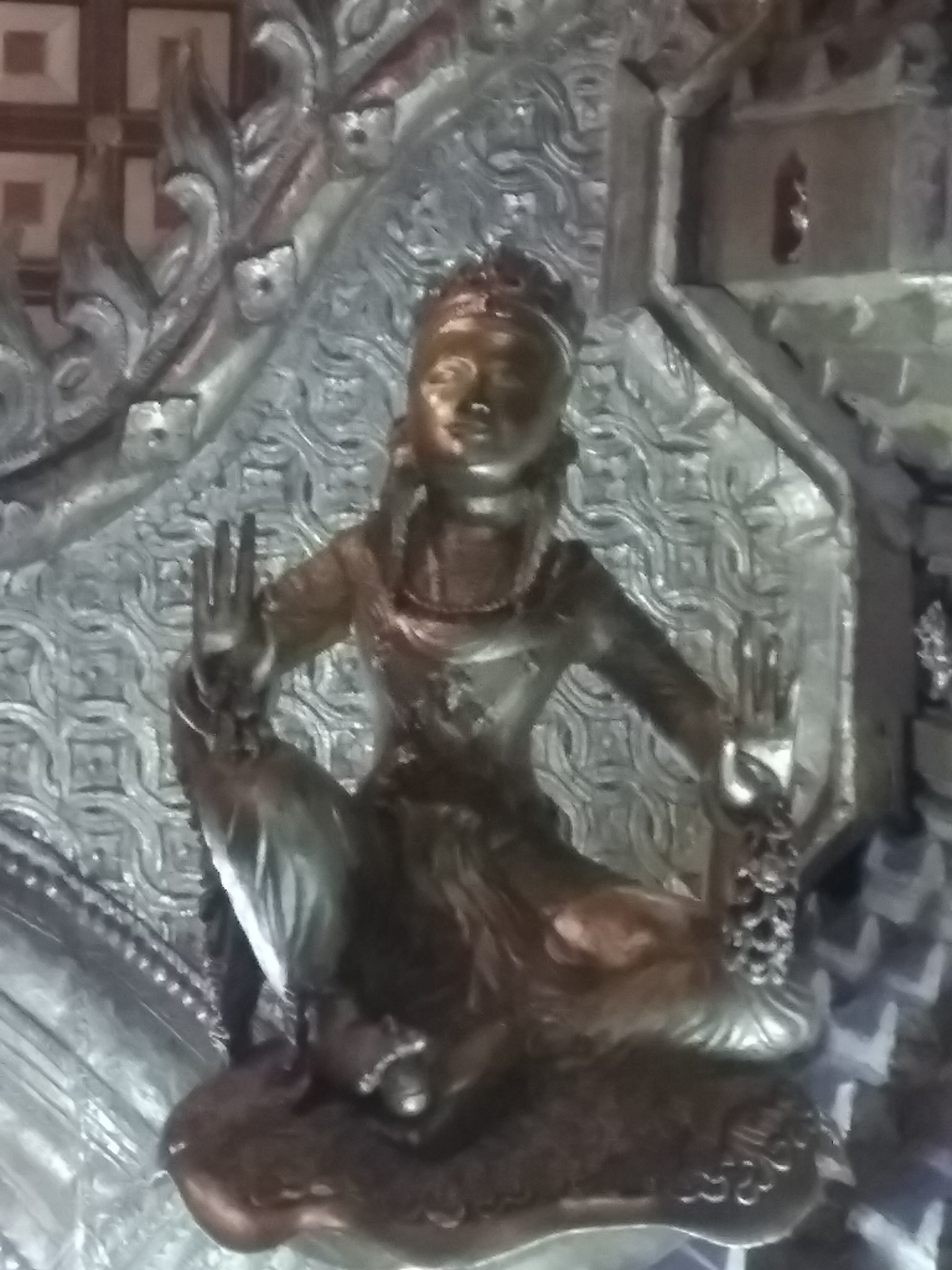
A Lokanat image symbolising peace, at the left side of the throne.

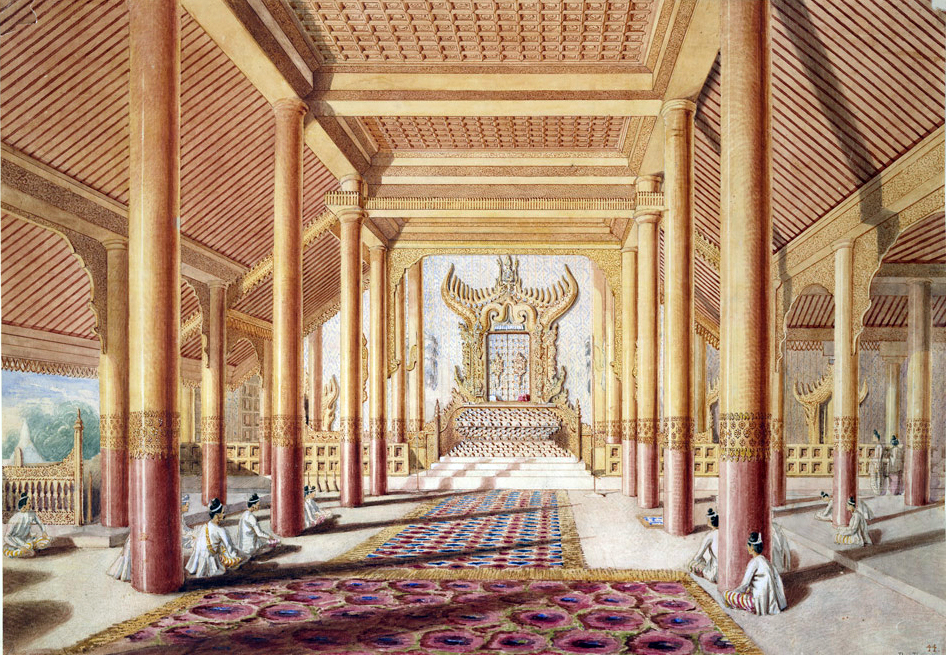
Painting of the Lion Throne in Amarapura Palace

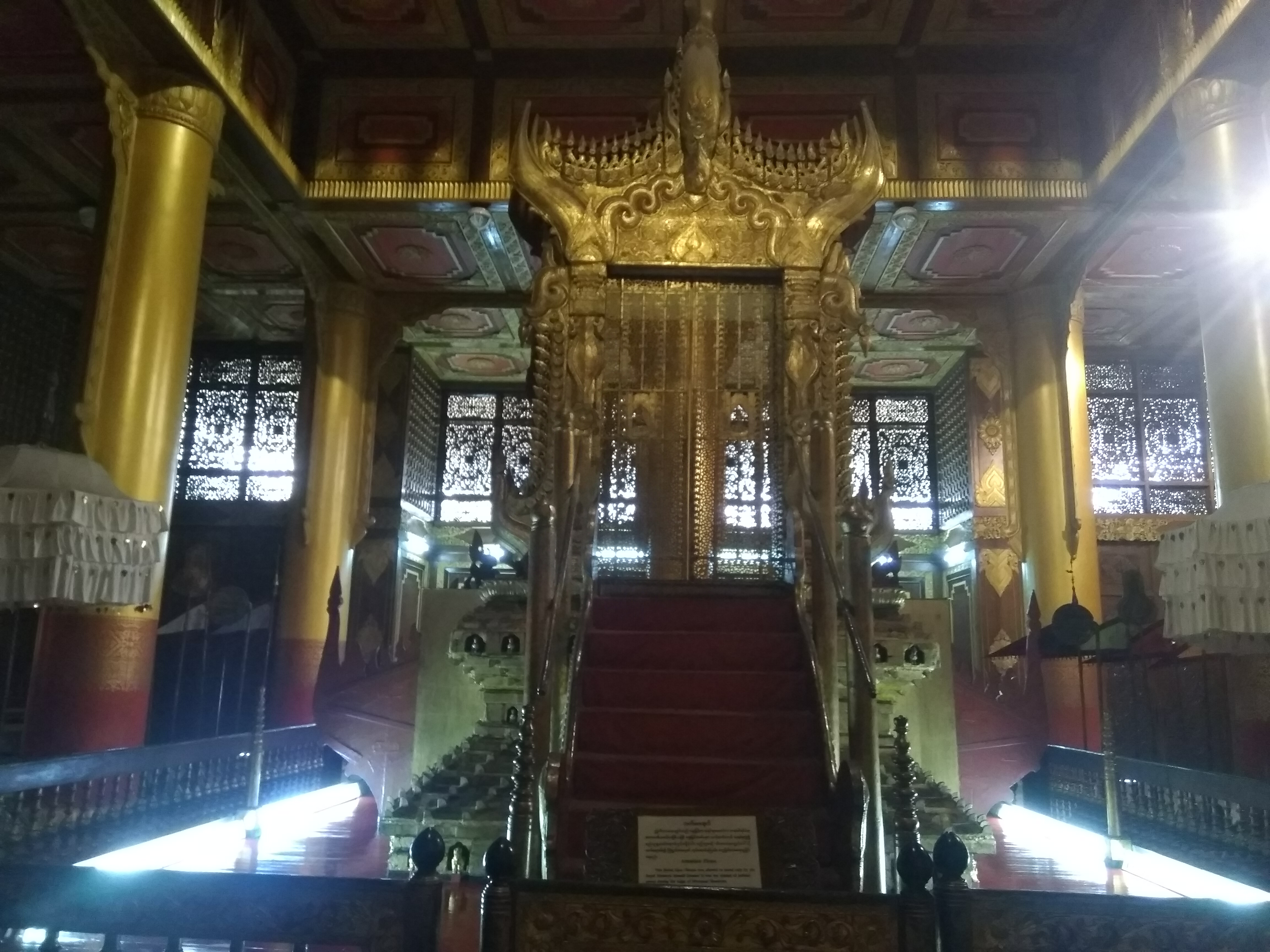
The stairway leading to the doors of the Lion Throne.

== See also ==
- Palin (throne)
- Thibaw Min – Burma's last king
