= Wenshou =

Chinese architectural feature

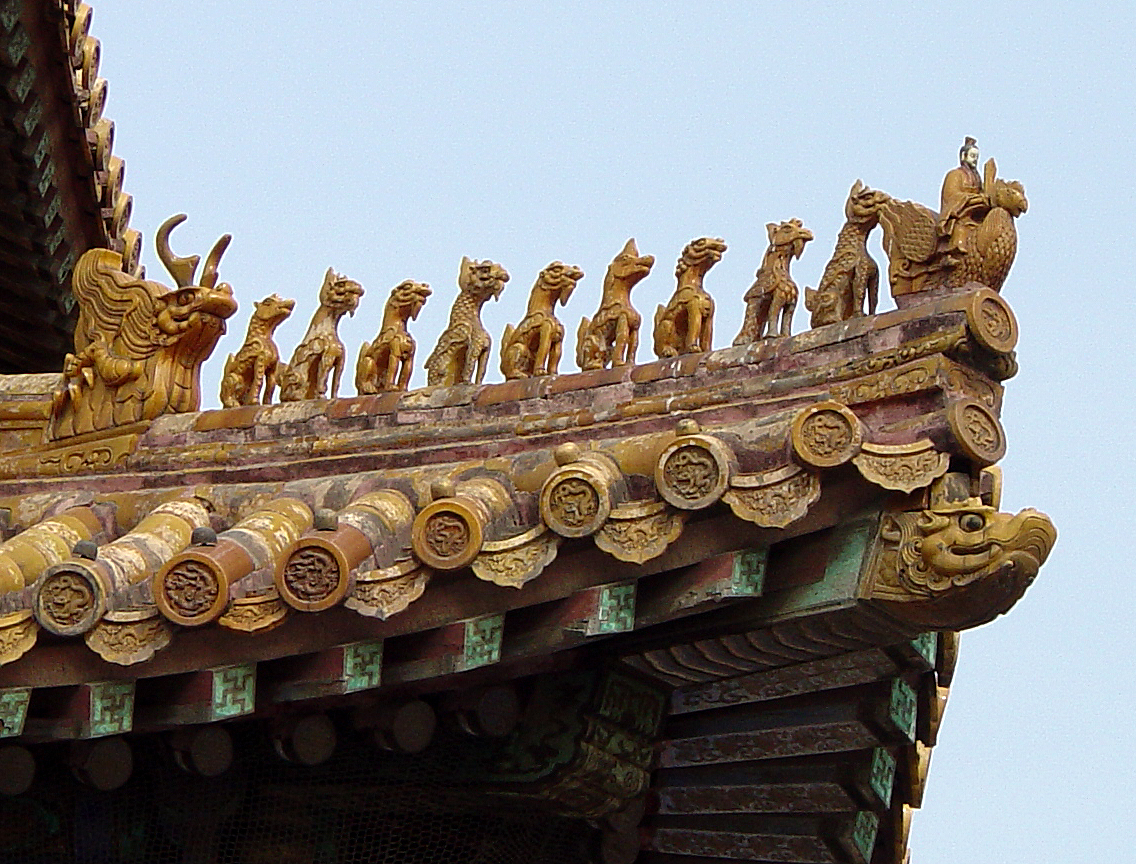
Wenshou lining the roof edge on the Hall of Supreme Harmony at the Forbidden City

Wenshou, also called zoomorphic ornaments, are figurines or statues of various animals, both mythological and real. The animals featured in wenshou have significant symbolism within the Chinese culture and Buddhist religion. These traditional decorative elements are most commonly featured on roofs of imperial structures, the most prominent example being the Hall of Supreme Harmony in the Forbidden City in what is today the Dongcheng District in Beijing, China.

== Cultural significance ==
Archaeological findings suggest that the tradition of placing animal figures on roof-ridges has been a practiced custom for a minimum of 2,100 years. Though wenshou serve an aesthetic purpose, they were also used to fight superstitious beliefs through the symbolism of what each figure represents. Today, wenshou serve as cultural artifacts of China, as they are existing physical representations of the traditions, values, and beliefs of the era in which they were erected. Wenshou were also used as symbols of hierarchy and status on Imperial Palaces. For example, the Hall of Supreme Harmony features the most roof ornaments of the palaces within the Forbidden City, and therefore is the most important of the three. In addition to the Hall of Supreme Harmony, wenshou are featured in smaller numbers on the Hall of Central Harmony and the Hall of Preserving Harmony at the Forbidden City.

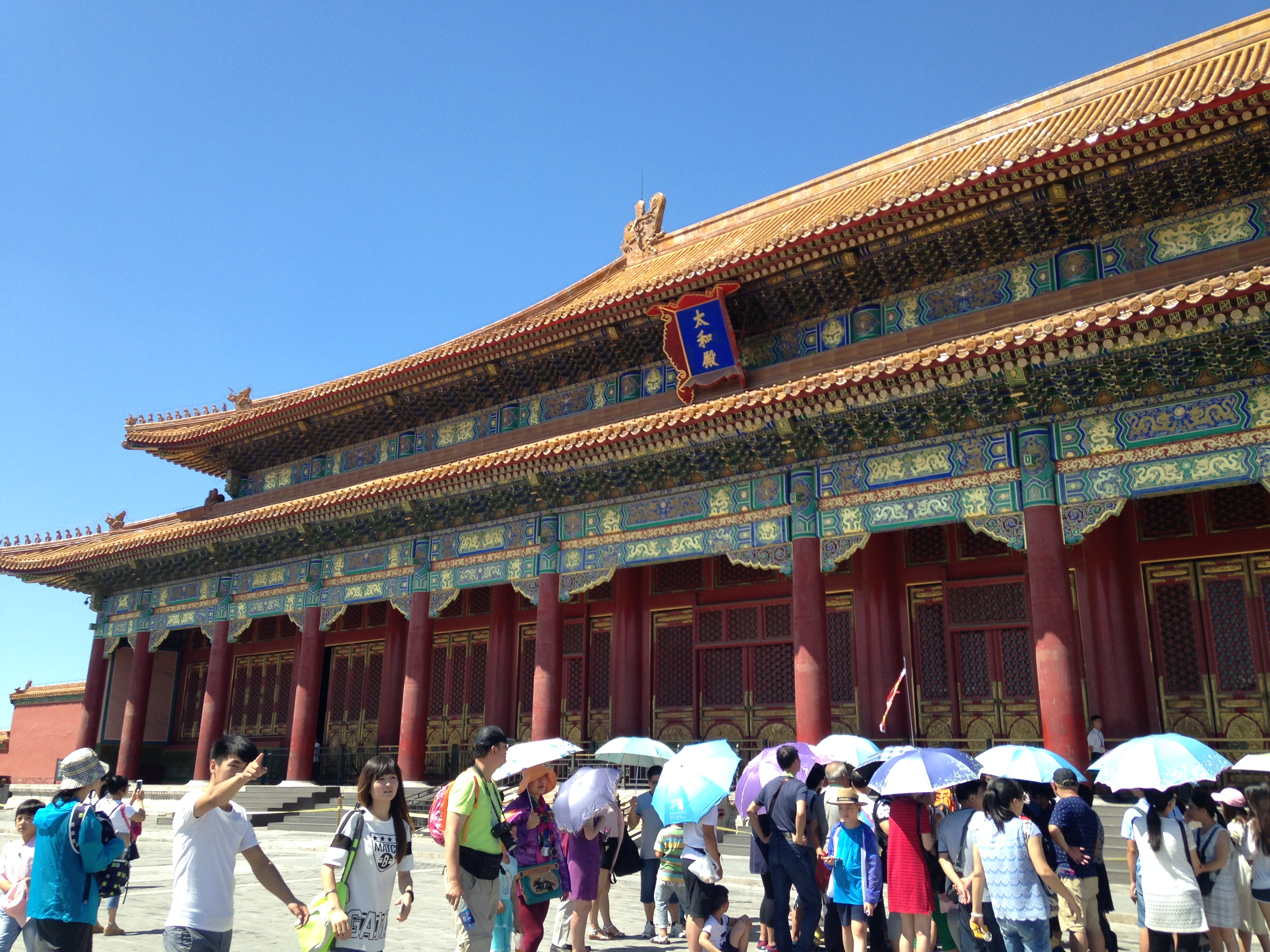
Hall of Supreme Harmony

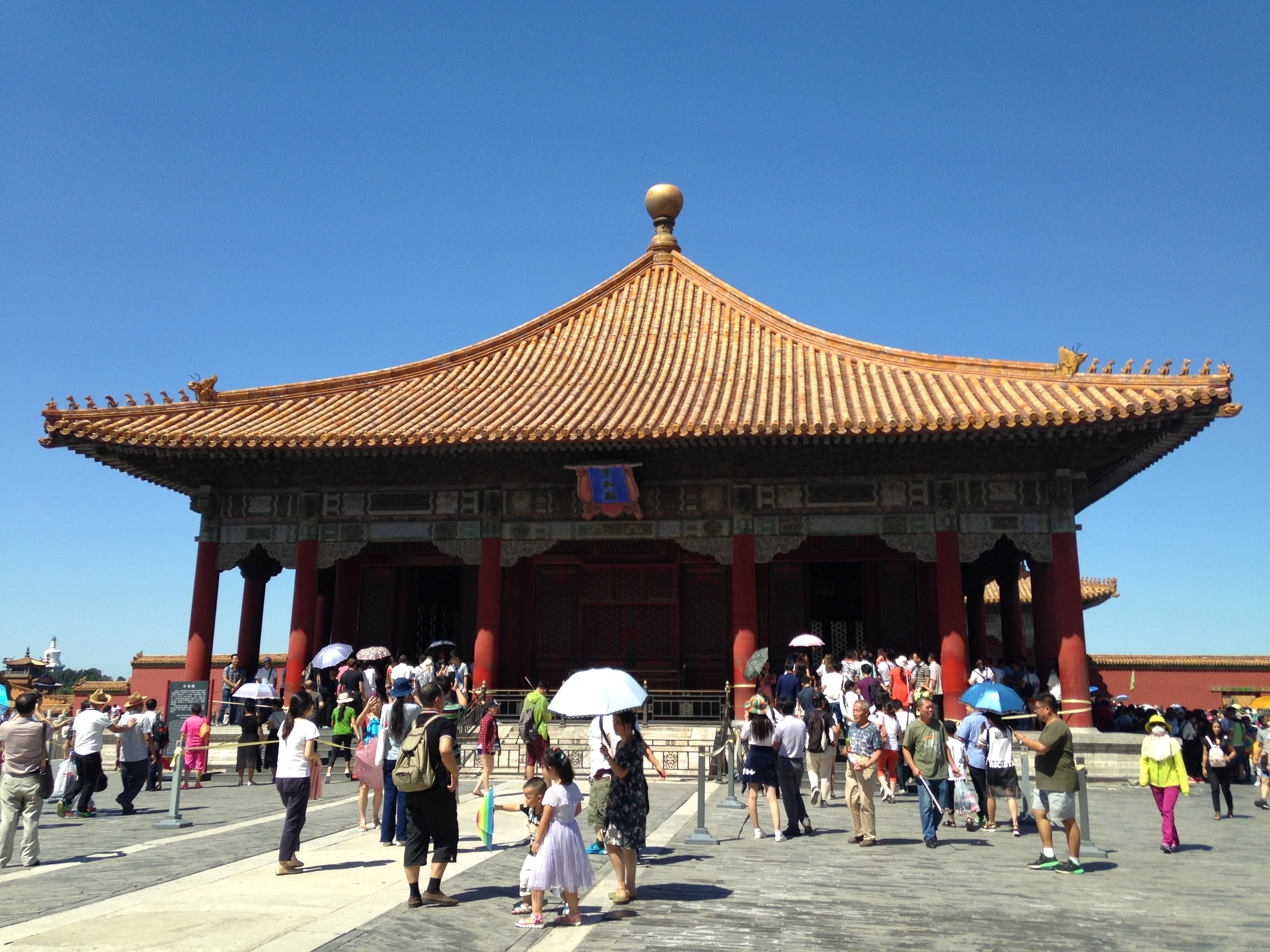
Hall of Central Harmony

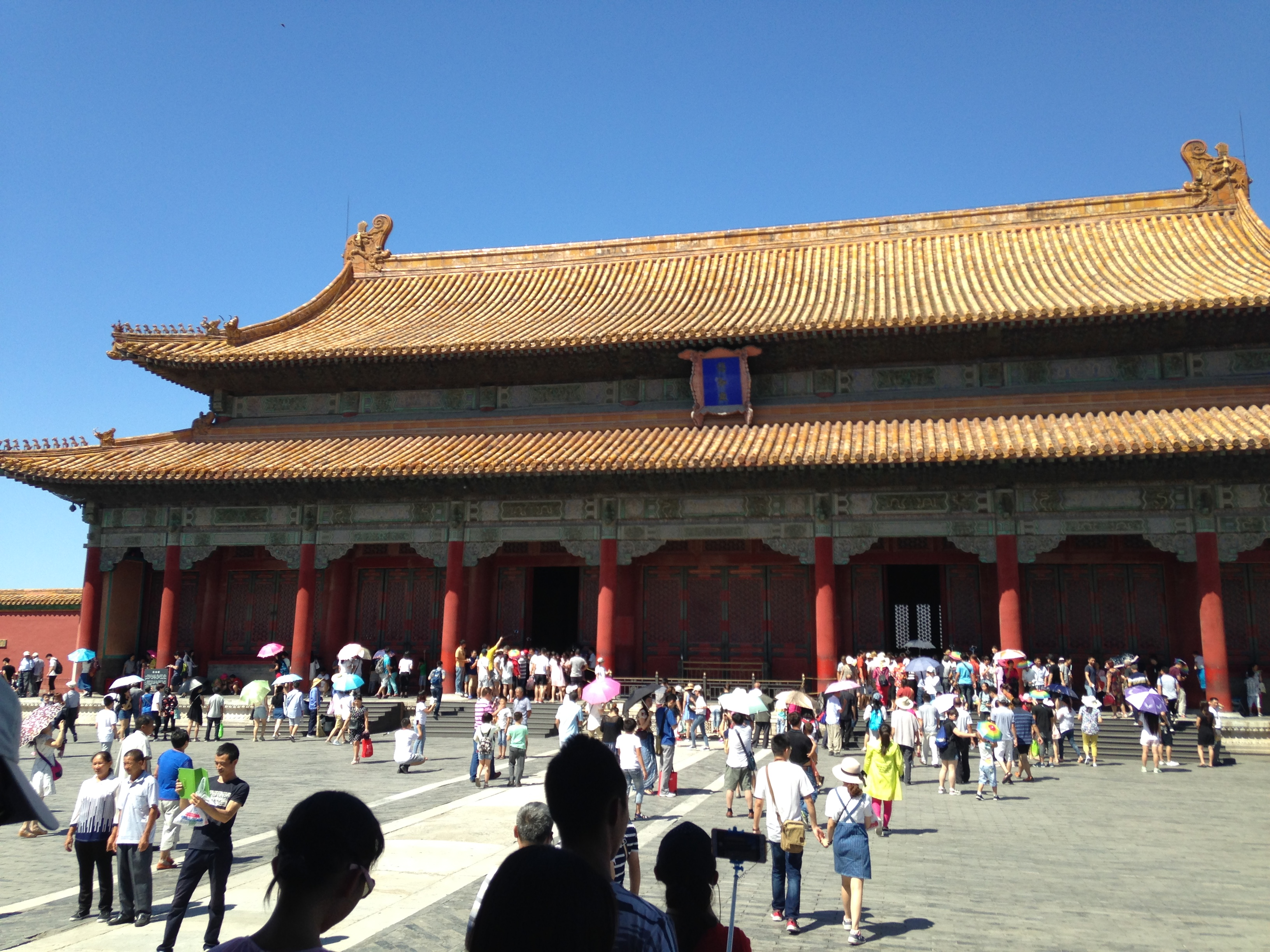
Hall of Preserving Harmony

== Symbolism ==
Different animal figurines represent different symbols, each having a unique purpose so as to show status or fight superstitious beliefs. The symbolism of each figure aligns with the significance of the being as recognized by the Buddhist religion. Among these ornaments are the lion, the dragon, and the horse, as well as many other figures, both existing and mythological.

=== The Lion ===
- Lions are seen as the "kings of the animal kingdom"
- Symbols of royalty, wisdom, and pride
- Also seen in the form of the Mythical Lion, as the dragon's spawn

=== The Dragon ===
- Symbols of honor and power

=== The Horse ===
- Symbols of transportation
- Horses can run fast and are said to have once had wings according to Buddhist iconography, allowing them to fly
