= Throne room =

Room in a monarch's residence

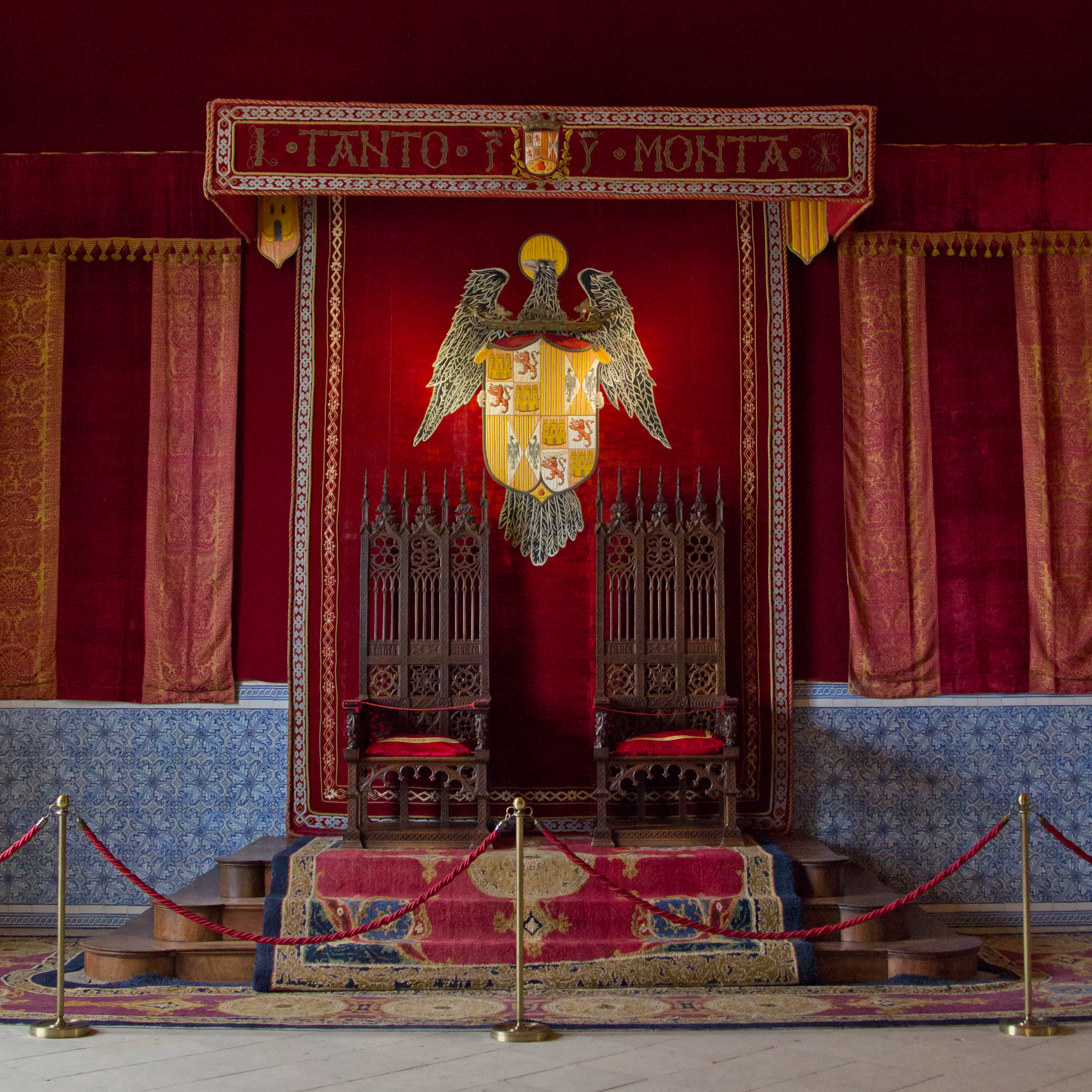
Throne Room, Alcázar of Segovia.

A throne room or throne hall is the room, often rather a hall, in the official residence of the crown, either a palace or a fortified castle, where the throne of a senior figure (usually a monarch) is set up with elaborate pomp—usually raised, often with steps, and under a canopy, both of which are part of the original notion of the Greek word thronos.

== Function ==
A throne room is a setting for a monarch to preside 'in majesty' over official ceremonies, to hold council, to grant audiences, to receive homage, to award high honors and offices, and to perform other official functions. Any of these could just as well be transferred, even on a permanent basis, to one or more other rooms, even outside the palace or ambulant. It can also be where the royal court can gather.

A common misconception is that kings and other ruling princes governed their lands seated on a throne for most of the working day. This may have been true in earlier times, for some rulers who actually presided over their council; yet often, another room was used, but only in peacetime.

Many others were almost constantly on the move with an ambulant court. It could even have been that the crown did not have an effective capital, as in England during most of the time before the Norman Conquest. Or it could have been that the crown had, rather, a series of alternative residences, as did the Holy Roman Emperors. In their case, these developed into palatinates under the Habsburg dynasty when they also acquired extensive crown lands outside Germany and Austria, and their court often travelled on an almost continental scale.

Other monarchies frequently changed their capital, but then they would have used a mobile throne, possibly in addition to the permanent one used for enthronement and/or coronation. There are cases in Africa and Asia where the very name of the 'capital' is not a fixed place, but was the place wherever a king settled for a few years. In some climates court migrated annually between a summer and a winter capital. It was also common to spend quite some time, without need for practical reason, in secondary residences, not in the least hunting lodges.

Even when their capitals were fixed, English and French Renaissance kings used to travel extensively, and maintained many royal castles, in addition to paying visits to grandees of the realm. Henry VIII's most frequently used residence was, in fact, at Hampton Court, which was then outside London.

Even when in the main or only palace, the monarch often spent much time in other parts of the residence, such as the dining hall, the chapel, private quarters (for rest and family life), possibly a separate presence room, the council chamber, ballroom, gardens, court, theatre, and other recreational facilities.

Nowadays, throne rooms are only used for occasional grand ceremonies. Paperwork is done in an office, and most guests are received in a salon.

== Notable examples ==
The following are notable throne rooms. Others are listed in the article on thrones.

=== Austria ===
==== Hofburg ====
Once the seat of the Holy Roman Empire and the Austrian Empire for over 600 years, the Hofburg Imperial Palace's throne room now serves as a conference centre, used by the Austrian Congress and for other international events.

=== Canada ===
The chamber of the Senate of Canada in Centre Block, which takes many of its design cues from the chamber of the British House of Lords at the Palace of Westminster, contains three thrones at its head. These thrones are used for the annual Speech from the Throne, which can be seen as a form of royal audience for Parliament, and thus the Senate chamber can be seen as a throne room in the royal presence.

=== China ===
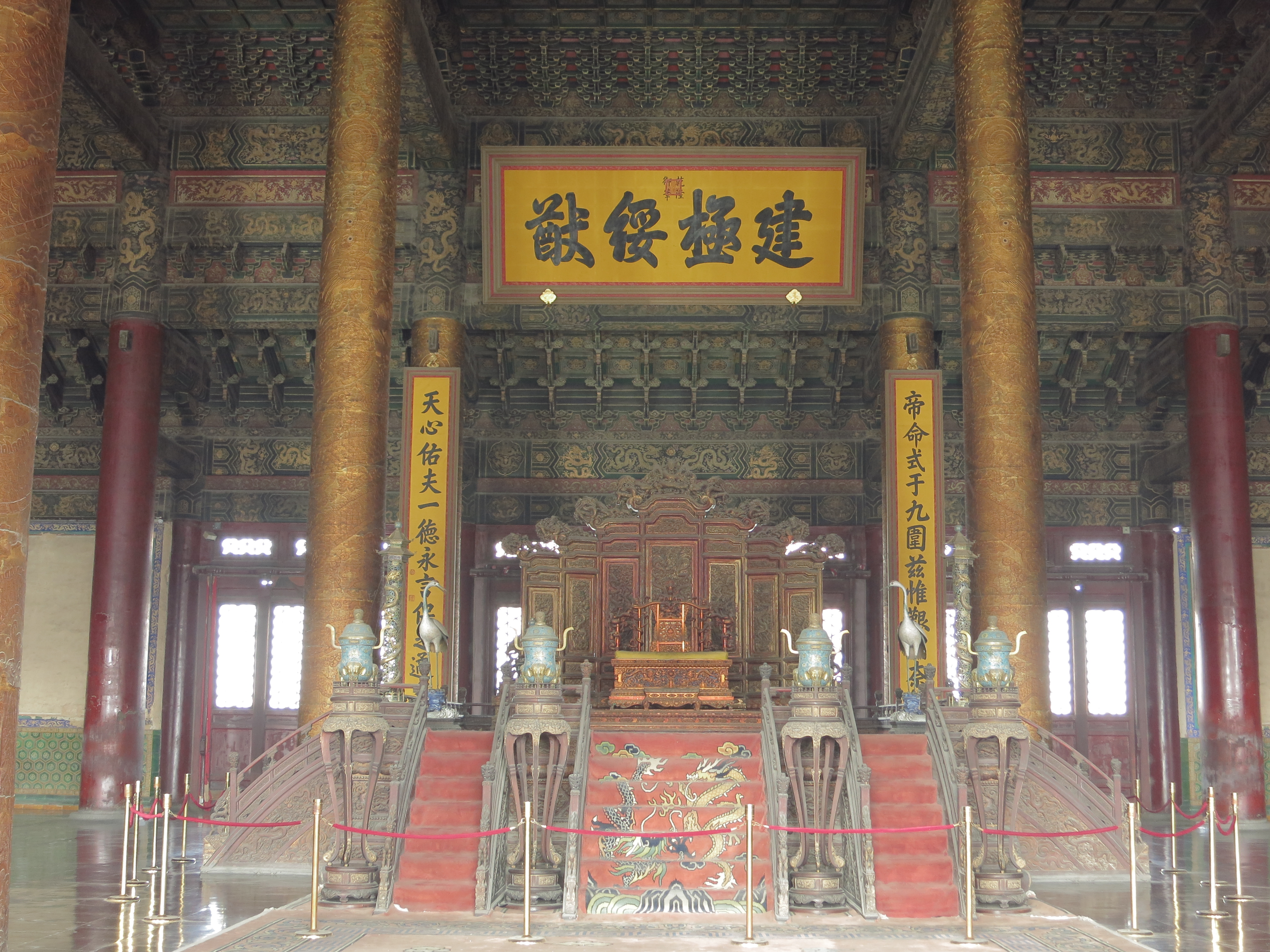
The principal imperial throne of China, in the Hall of Supreme Harmony

In the Forbidden City, China's last imperial palace, the principal throne rooms are the three halls of the Outer Palace: the Hall of Supreme Harmony, the Hall of Central Harmony and the Hall of Preserving Harmony, of which the Hall of Supreme Harmony was the most important.

=== Denmark ===
==== Rosenborg ====
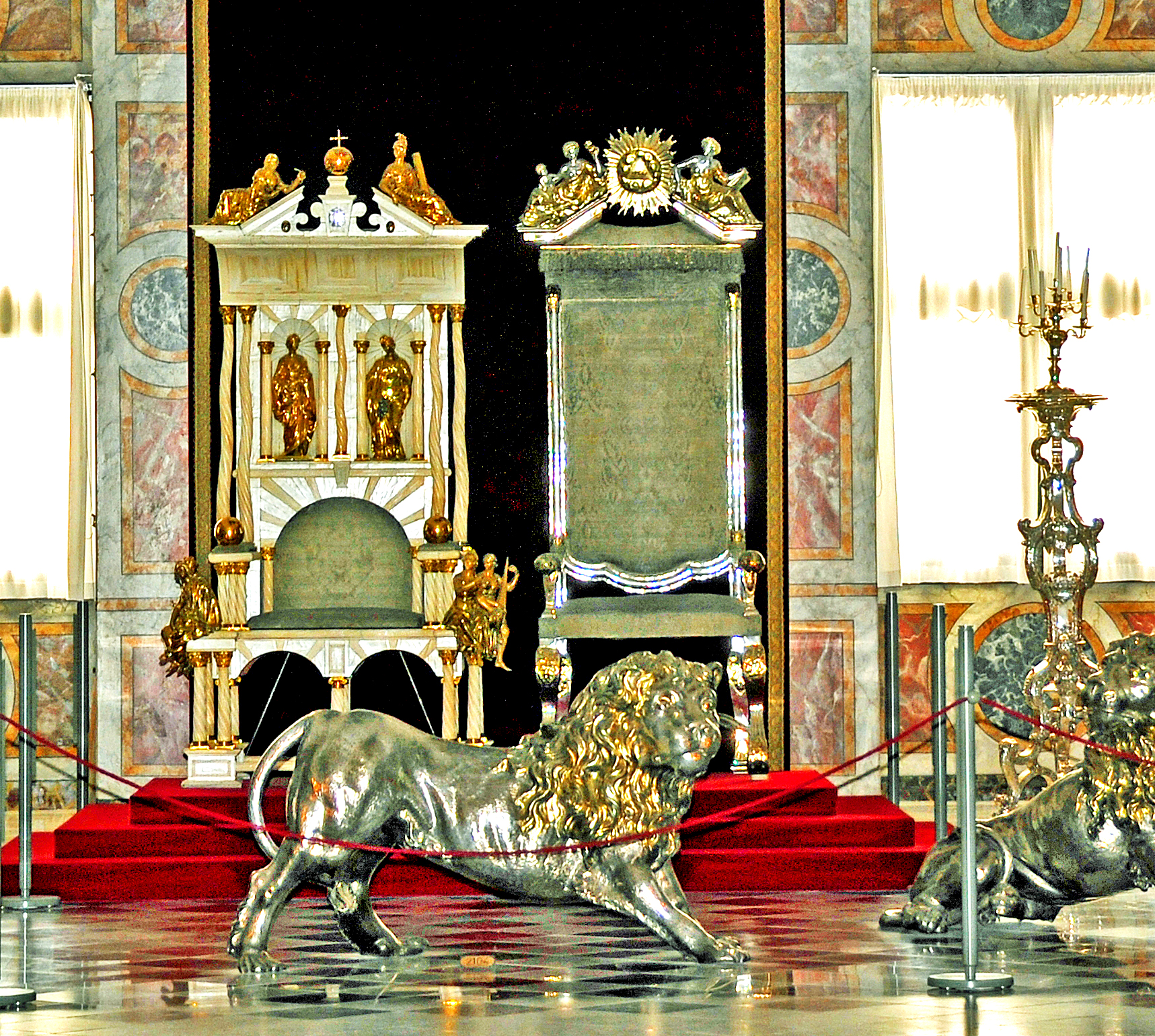
Denmark's anointing throne

The throne in the throne room at Rosenborg Castle (now a museum) in Copenhagen was commissioned by King Frederik III in about 1663, and used by the absolutist kings of Denmark from 1671 to 1840 for the anointing ceremony. It was probably created by Bendix Grodtschilling. It was inspired by King Solomon's throne which, according to the Bible, was made of ivory and had six steps with lion figures on each. Tooth of Narwhal was chosen as the material, both because it was found in Danish waters and owing to its mythical associations with the unicorn; twelve lions were also commissioned, three of which, in silver, have been preserved in the room.

==== Christiansborg ====
The throne room actually used for receiving ambassadors is at Christiansborg.

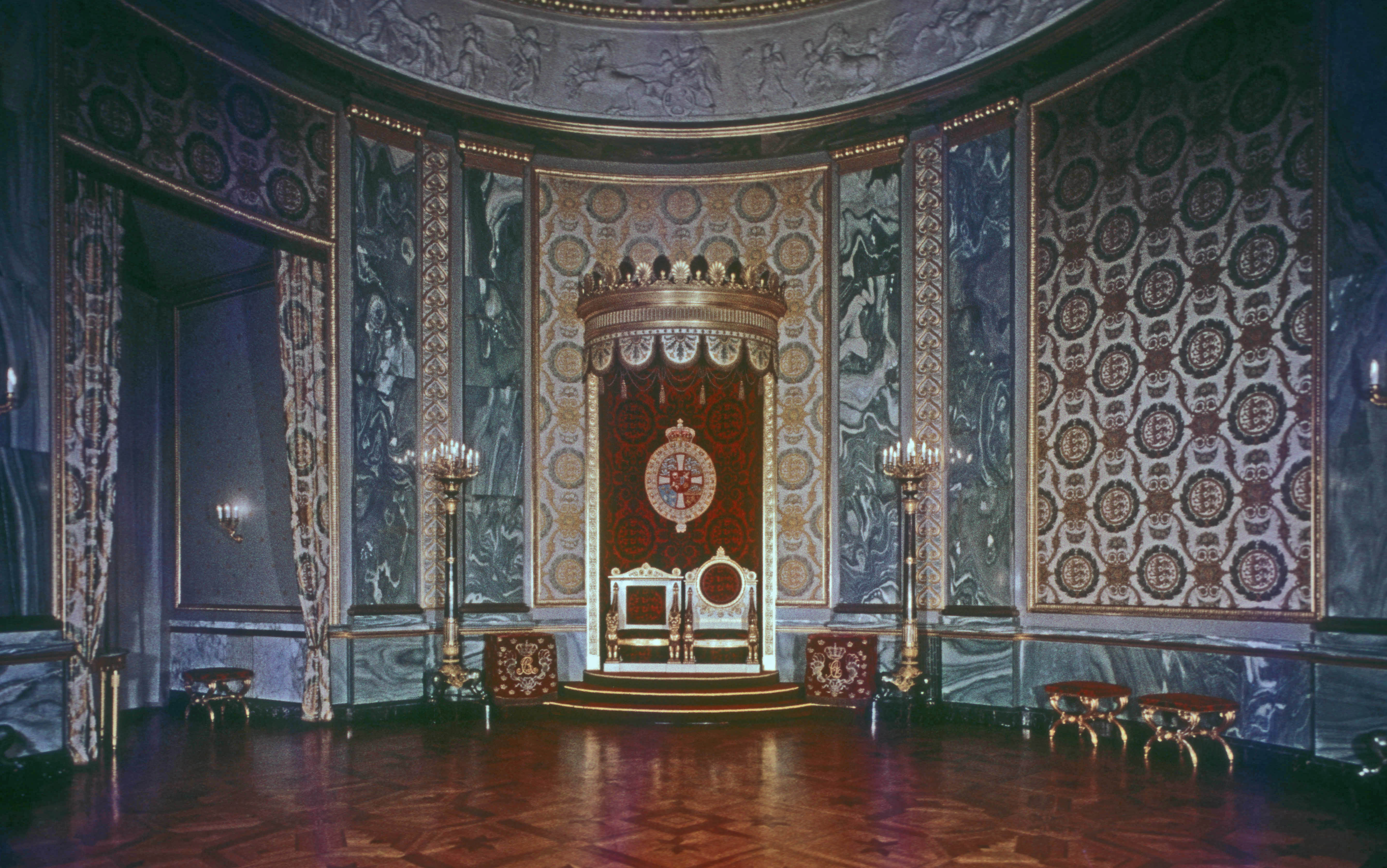
The Throne Room at Christiansborg is where foreign ambassadors present their credentials to the King.

=== France ===
==== Versailles ====
The throne was commissioned by King Louis XIV and was in use until 1789. In 1837, the Château de Versailles became a national museum. As part of the greater Versailles museum, the room is open to the public. Compare: Lit de justice.

==== Fontainebleau Palace ====
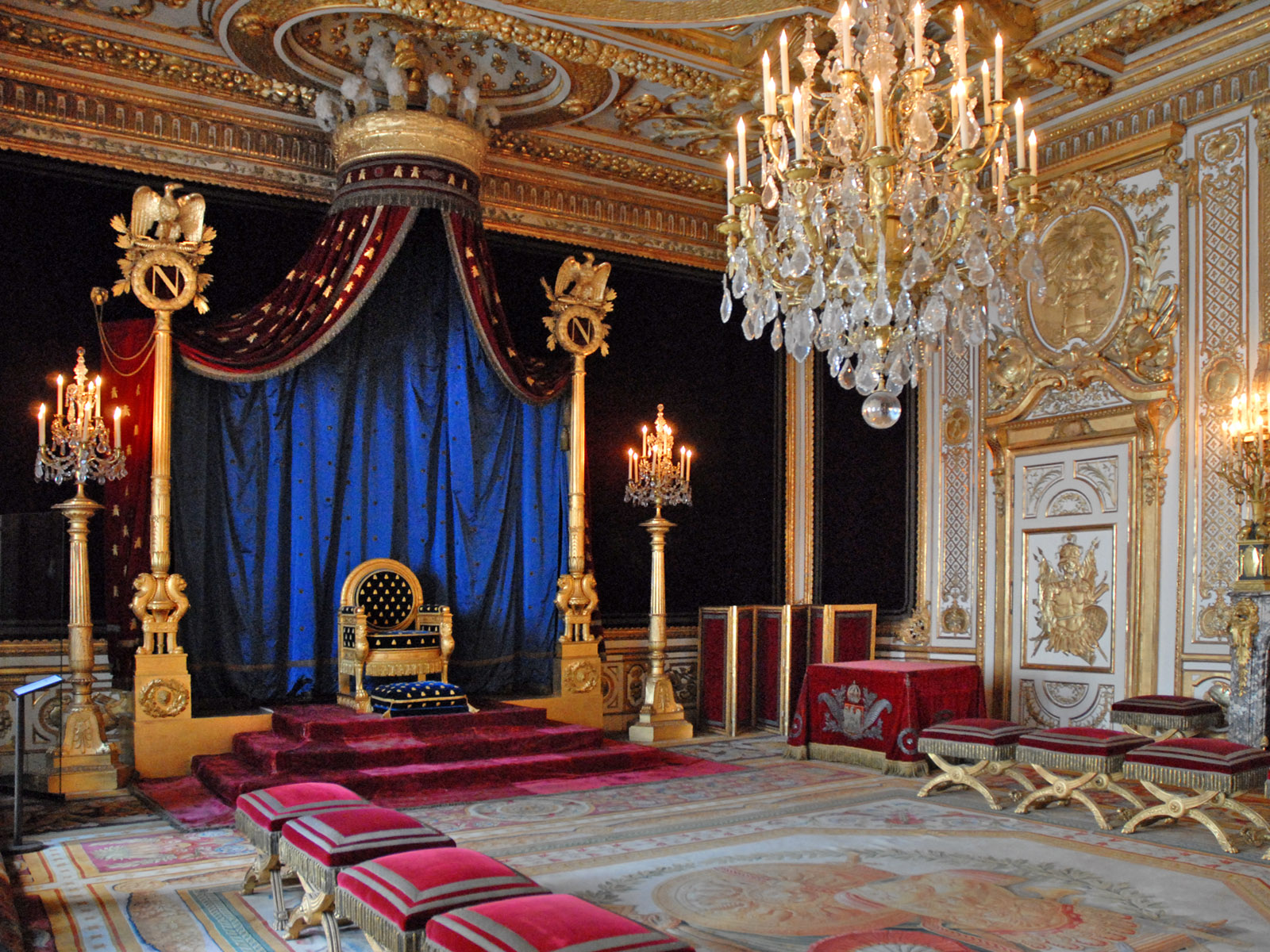
The throne room at the Palace of Fontainebleau, France.

Preferring Fontainebleau over Versailles, Emperor Napoleon I had King Louis XV's bedroom converted into an Imperial throne room, and it was here that Napoléon abdicated. The palace was last used by Napoléon III; it was later declared a national monument in 1871, after the collapse of the French Empire.

=== Monaco: Prince's Palace, ===
For over 700 years, the Grimaldi family have ruled Monaco, and it is in this throne room that many historic festivals and ceremonies have taken place since the 16th century. It is also where most civil marriages of the Princely Family occur, before then having a religious ceremony elsewhere.

=== Germany ===
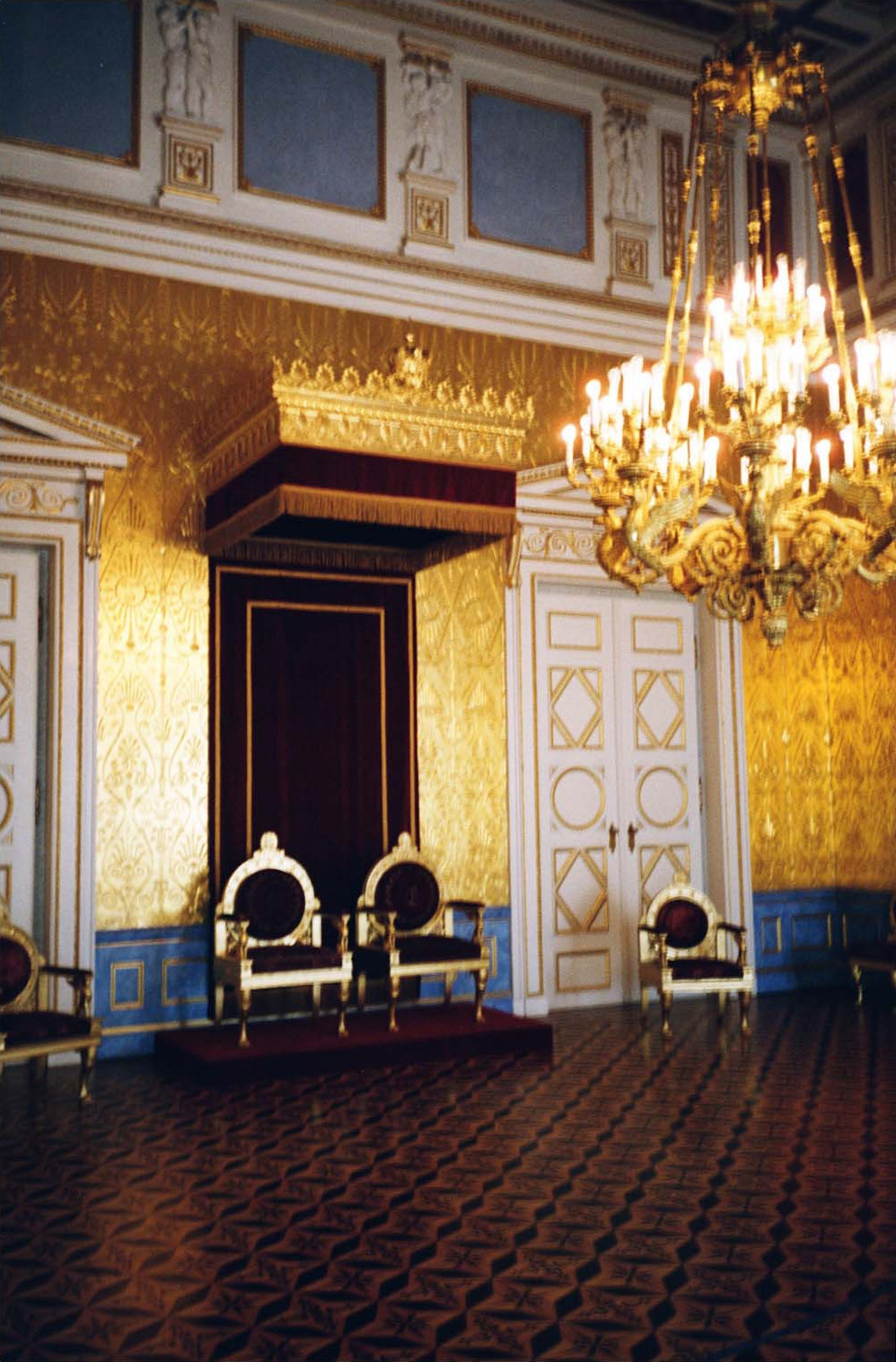
Thrones of the King and Queen, Residenz of Munich, Bavaria

==== Residence of Munich ====
The Residenz of the Wittelsbach monarchs of Bavaria has one celebration room, which was the former throne-room, but completely destroyed by the bombing of Munich during the Second World War. It is now reconstructed and again visitable; the (smaller) throne room was rebuilt in the classicism style of the 19th century. Once, bronze figures of twelve rulers of the house of Wittelsbach stood there, between corinthic columns on a rostrum. These were the honourable monarchs of Bavaria for centuries.

==== Neuschwanstein ====
The throne room of Neuschwanstein Castle does not have a throne inside because its commissioner, Ludwig II of Bavaria, did not live to see Neuschwanstein's completion, so one was never installed.

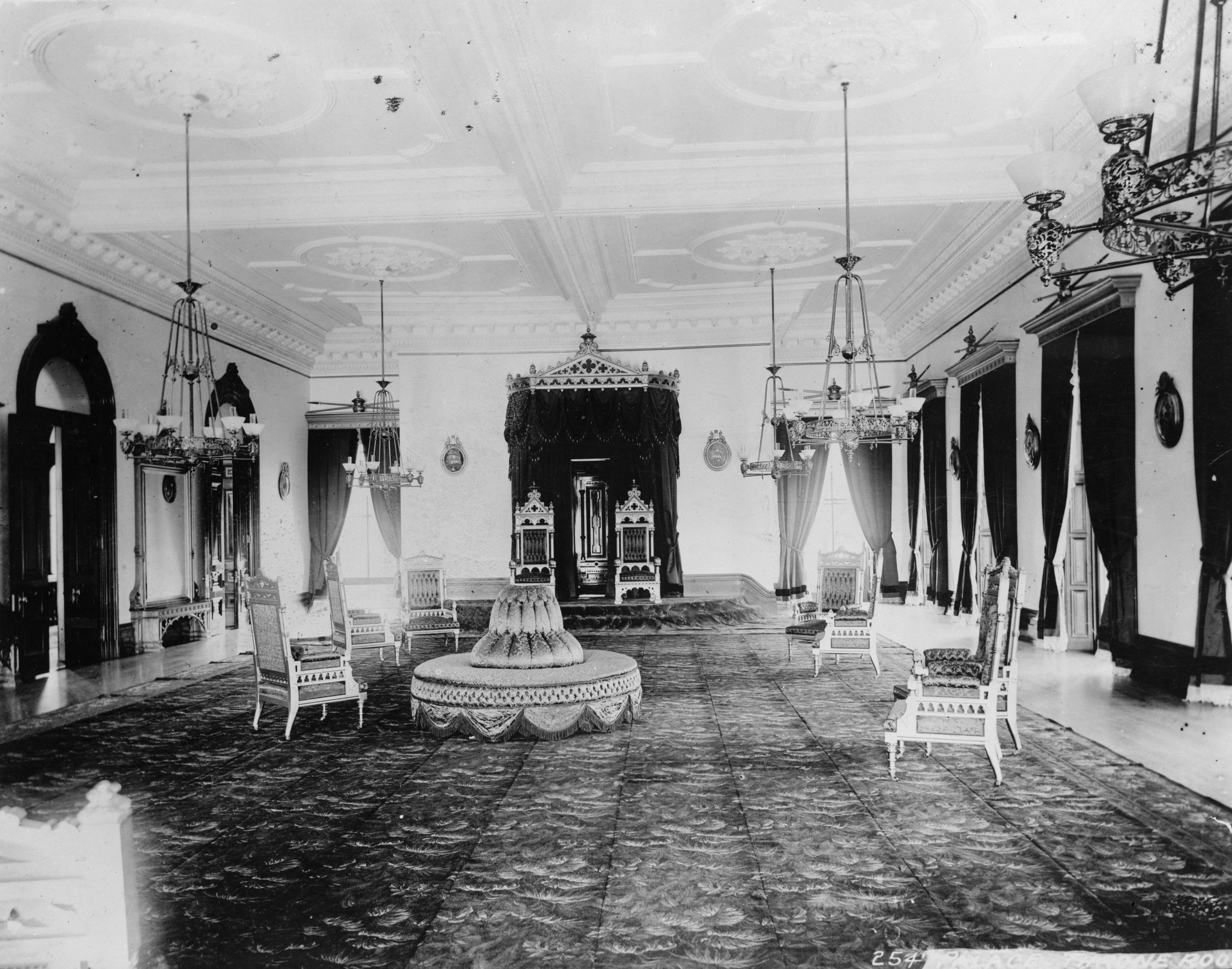
Iolani Palace throne room

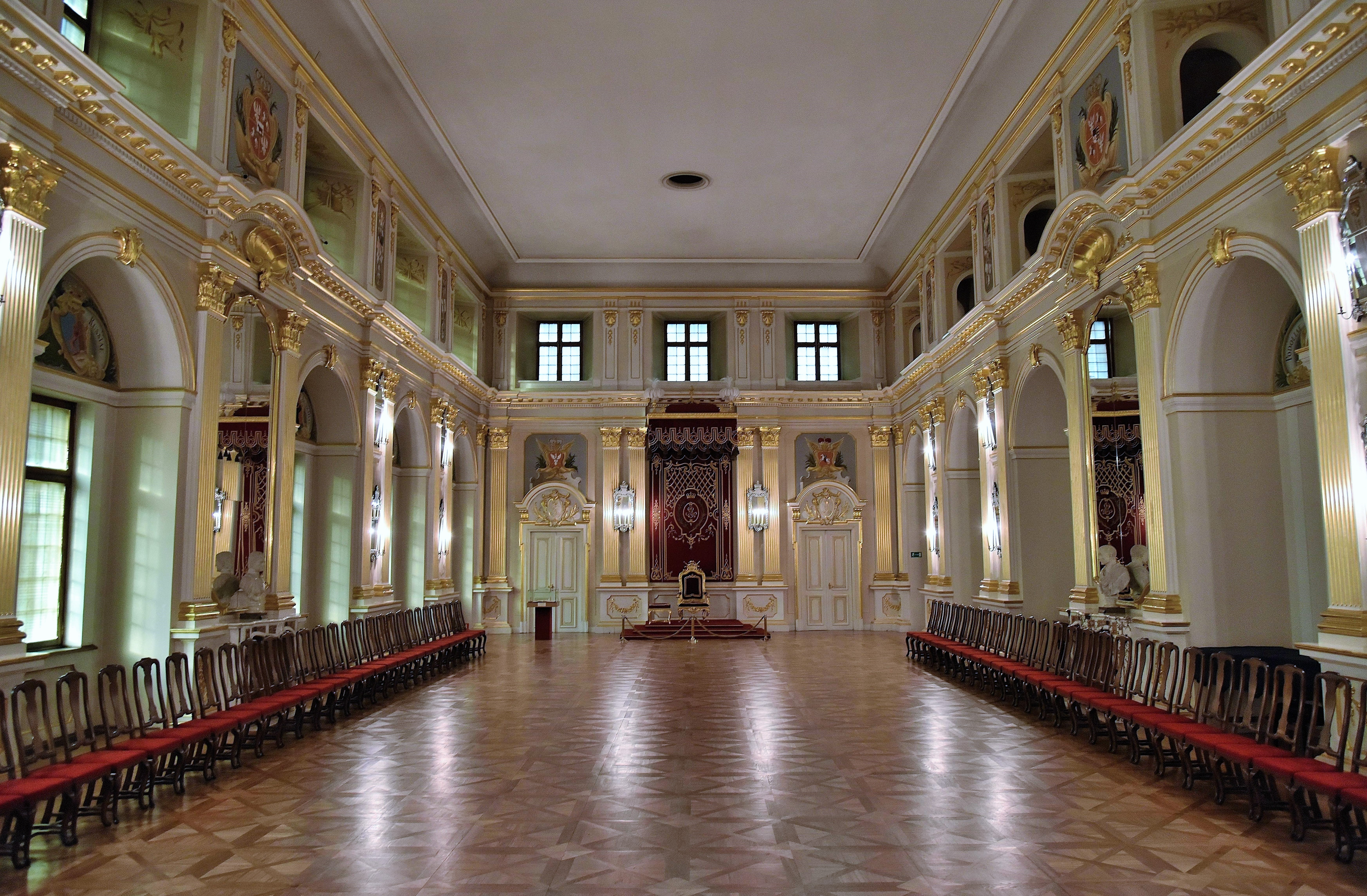
The Senators' Chamber in the Warsaw Royal Castle, Poland

=== Hawaii ===
==== ʻIolani Palace ====
The throne room at ʻIolani Palace was used by King David Kalākaua, his wife Queen Kapiʻolani, and his successor Queen Liliʻuokalani. Kalākaua and his wife actually disliked sitting on the thrones, instead preferring to stand in front of them while receiving guests. King Kalākaua held formal audiences, diplomatic receptions, and state balls, receiving and entertaining guests from all walks of life, from royalty and diplomats to writers, entertainers, and sportsmen. Following her overthrow, the trial of Queen Liliʻuokalani also occurred in this room where she was found guilty and imprisoned within the palace by the Republic of Hawaii. The throne room, like the rest of the palace, is open to the public.

=== Portugal ===
Ajuda National Palace Throne Room

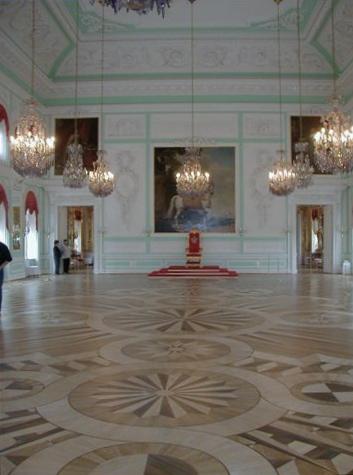
Grand Throne room in Peterhof Palace

==== Ajuda Palace, Lisbon ====
The Portuguese Throne room (pt. Sala do Trono) is in the Piano nobile of the Ajuda National Palace (Palácio Nacional da Ajuda) in Lisbon. The present decoration is from the 19th century, with walls covered with crimson velvet, gold gilded French mirrors and a major Tabriz carpet from the 18th century in the precious wood floor. The ceiling is covered with Máximo dos Reis allegorical fresco and a huge crystal chandelier. The thrones are from Portuguese fabric, second half of the 18th century with the Portuguese coat of arms on the top handled by two angels. This fauteuils ware made to substitute the Juste-Aurèle Meissonnier’s throne made to John V of Portugal and destroyed in the 1755 Lisbon earthquake. This throne was in Silver-gilt, with winged dragons, the heraldic symbolf of the House of Braganza, and the arms of Portugal supported by two allegorical statues, Europe and America. The Throne room is still used for state events of the Portuguese Republic.

=== Russia ===
==== Peterhof ====
Used by the Tsars of Russia, the dais and throne of the Peterhof Palace dominate the eastern wall with a large picture presenting Catherine II on her horse. The room also holds numerous oil paintings and eleven chandeliers.

==== Winter Palace ====
Regarded as the throne of Russia, the throne of St. George's Hall (or large throne room) is set atop the seven-stepped dais with a proscenium arch above and the symbol of the imperial family behind (the two-headed eagle).

Peter I's Room (the smaller throne room) is modest in comparison to the former. The throne was made for Empress Anna Ivanovna in London and the picture behind displays Peter the Great with Minerva.

=== Spain ===
==== Royal Palace of Madrid ====
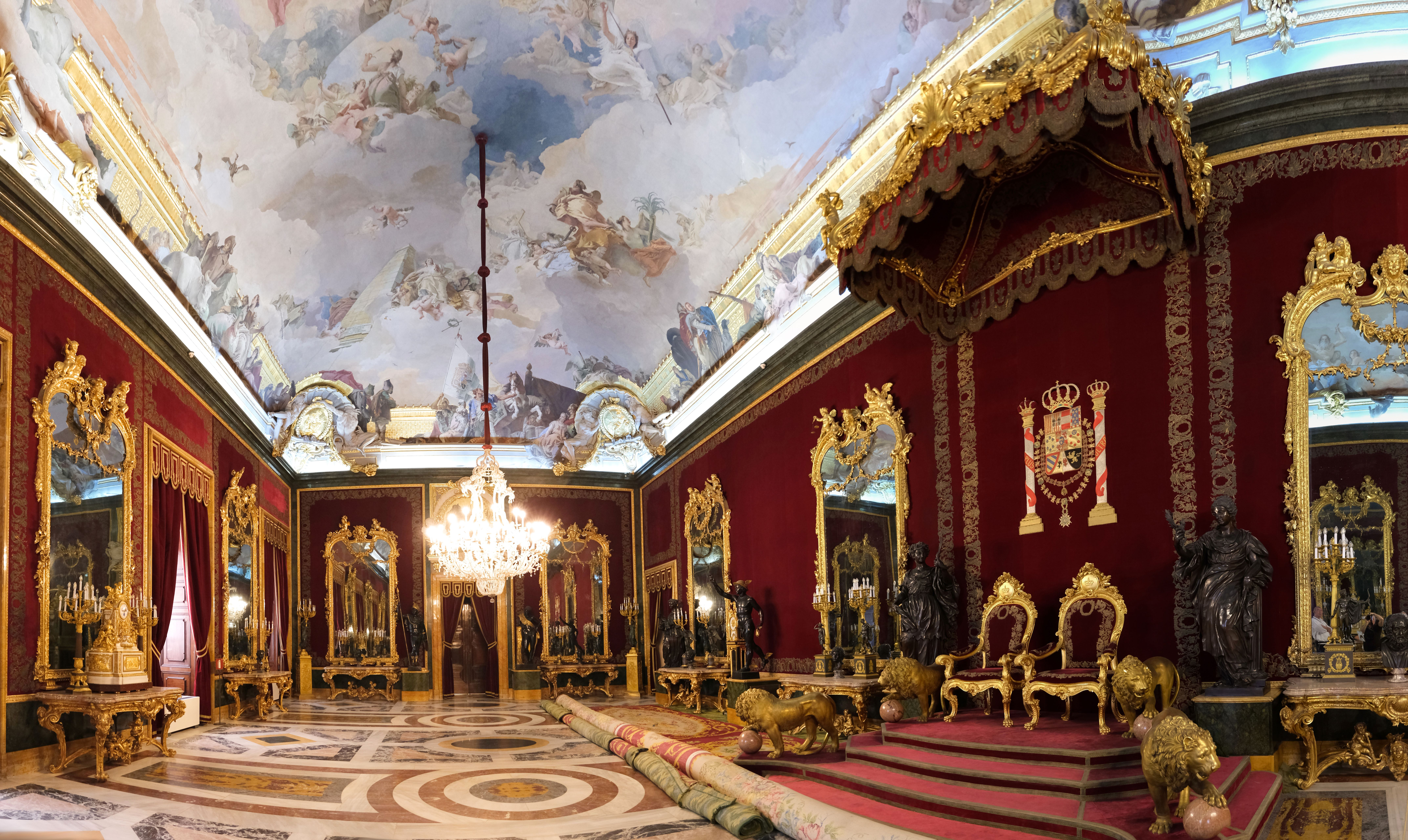
Throne Room of the Royal Palace of Madrid decored in the reign of Charles III of Spain

The Royal Palace of Madrid was the official residence of the Spanish monarch. The throne room is unique, as it retains the original decor from the days of Charles III. The sumptuous room has gold garnishing with crimson-velvet wall coverings complemented by a Tiepolo ceiling, lit by a rock crystal chandelier. Adorning the room are huge mirrors made in the royal glass factory of La Granja.

The royal family does not reside in the palace, instead choosing a smaller, more modest palace, the Zarzuela Palace, on the outskirts of Madrid. However, the Royal Palace of Madrid remains the official residence of the Spanish monarchy and is used for state occasions.

=== Sweden ===
==== Stockholm Palace ====
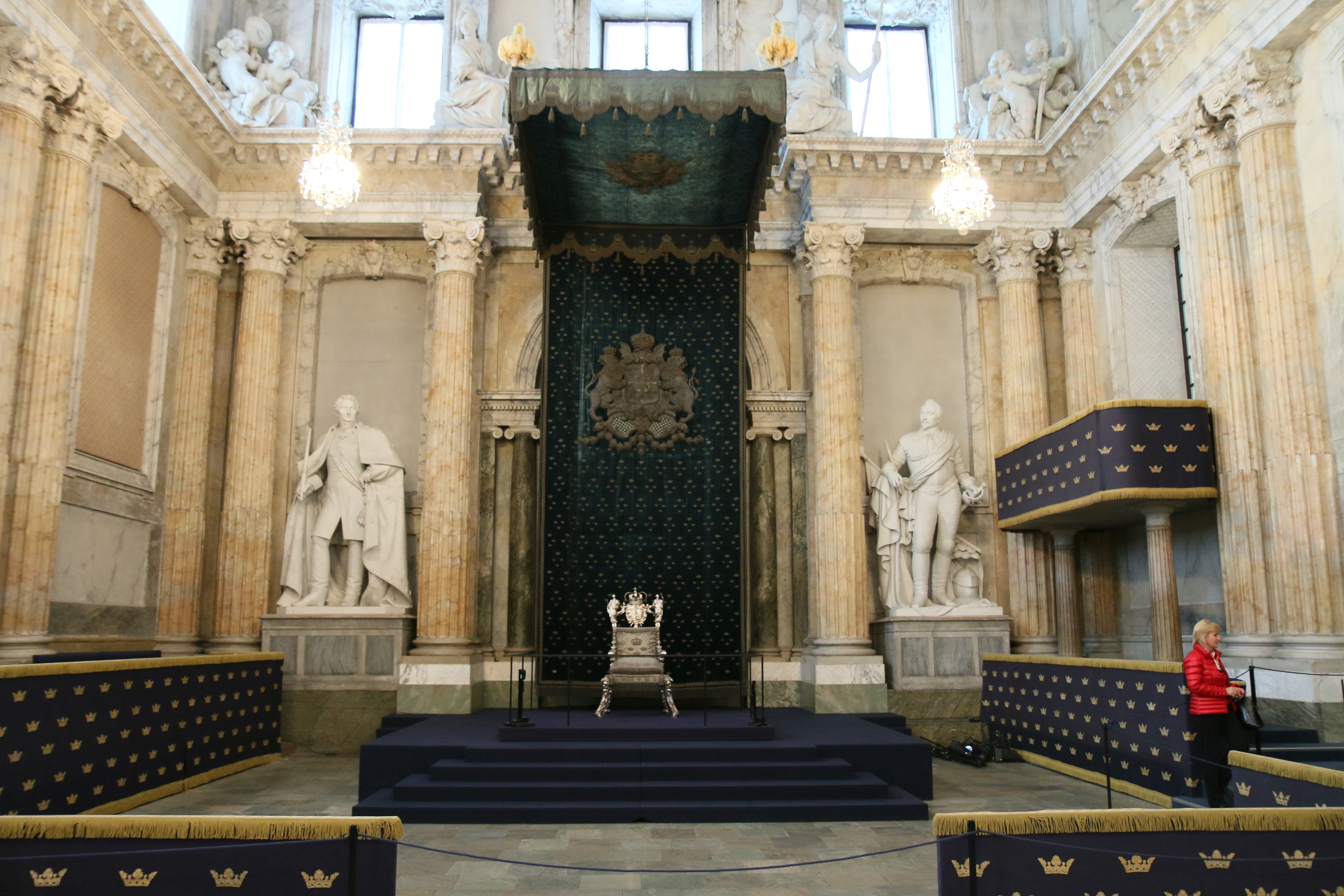
The Silver Throne in the Hall of State.

The throne located in the Hall of State at the Stockholm Palace is called the Silver Throne and was commissioned for the coronation of Queen Kristina in 1650. It was last used by the present king, Carl XVI Gustaf, on his accession to the throne in 1973 and at the State Opening of Parliament in 1974.

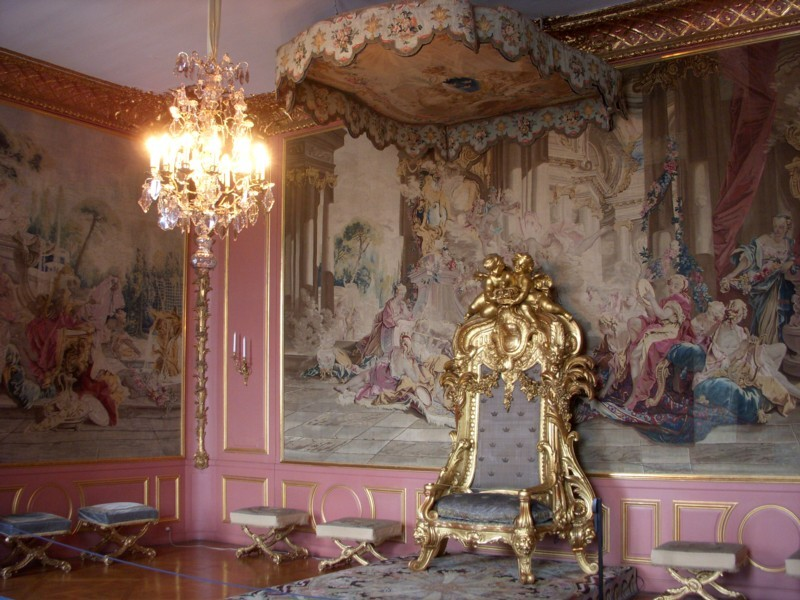
Throne in the Lovisa Ulrika audience chamber at Stockholm Palace.

For the coronation of king Adolf Frederick and Queen Louisa Ulrica in 1750 two coronation thrones were made. Both are placed at the Stockholm palace, and one is on display in the Lovisa Ulrica audience chamber.

=== United Kingdom ===
The United Kingdom monarchs almost always had their own personal throne constructed. Until 1900, each throne was usually given away or melted down at the end of the monarch's reign for the next throne. The thrones after 1900 were saved. The exact number of thrones in the United Kingdom is unknown, though there are at least more than five. The United Kingdom differs from other countries as it has instead of one or two thrones, numerous thrones, some of which are 800 years old. The “throne” used for the anointing and crowning of the monarch during the Coronation of the British Monarch is called the Chair of St. Edward, or St. Edward’s Chair. The Chair, which is centuries old, is usually on display at Westminster Abbey.

==== Buckingham Palace ====
The Throne Room of Buckingham Palace, the official residence of the British monarch in London, is used for court gatherings and as a second dancing room. It is dominated by a proscenium arch supported by a pair of winged figures of 'victory' holding garlands above the two Chairs of Estate, which were originally made for Queen Elizabeth II’s coronation in 1953 and were refurbished for King Charles III and Queen Camilla for their coronation in 2023 and embroidered with the cyphers of the new King and Queen.

It is in the throne room that the sovereign, on special occasions, receives loyal addresses. Another use of the throne room has been for formal wedding photographs. The throne room is usually not used for ambassadors' arrival, which is usually in the ambassadors room of Buckingham Palace.

Apart from the Thrones in the room actually named Throne Room, there is also a pair of Thrones in the Buckingham Palace Ballroom, that is a larger multi-purpose hall within the palace. The ballroom is also used for investiture ceremonies in the UK's honours system.

There are also other thrones in the Throne Room. To the right of the sovereign's throne is Queen Victoria's throne and opposite that on the other side of the room is the throne chairs of King George VI and his consort Queen Elizabeth. There are also two further thrones in the room.

==== St James's Palace ====
Although Buckingham Palace has been the primary official residence of the British monarchs since 1837, St James's Palace remains the senior palace of the British monarchy. St James's remains a busy working palace, and also retains an important ceremonial function: it still is the place where the Accession Council customarily meets to proclaim the new sovereign and to receive from them the required oath. This was last seen upon the accession of King Charles III.

St James's Throne Room is used for official occasions. For instance it is in this room that the lord mayor and councillors of the City of Westminster usually present an address of welcome to visiting heads of state on state visits.

While the Throne Room of Buckingham Palace has two thrones on the dias, one for the reigning monarch, and another for the monarch's consort, the Throne Room at St James's Palace contains only one throne, for the use of the sovereign. As in the case of Buckingham Palace, the throne is placed under a canopy.

The velvet cloth behind the throne is dominated by the coat of arms of the United Kingdom.

This room was more recently the setting for the announcement of the engagement of Prince William, Duke of Cambridge and Catherine Middleton, and in September 2022, the Accession Council met to proclaim Charles III as King of the United Kingdom.

==== Palace of Holyroodhouse ====
The Throne Room of the Palace of Holyroodhouse in Edinburgh, which has been the principal royal residence in Scotland since 1505, was originally the King's Guard Chamber, but has been used as the throne room since the visit of George IV in 1822. The present pair of thrones were made in 1911 for George V and Mary of Teck, and sit upon the dais beneath the Royal Arms of Scotland. Following the death of Elizabeth II at Balmoral Castle in September 2022, her coffin was transported to the palace, where it lay in repose in the Throne Room, before being taken in procession to St Giles' Cathedral.

==== Palace of Westminster ====
Although the primary purpose and reputation of the Palace of Westminster is as the seat of the Parliament of the United Kingdom, it is also officially a royal residence. While the palace has no throne room per se, the Lords Chamber contains at its head a throne, used by the monarch for addressing Parliament in the Speech from the Throne, arguably making the Chamber something of a throne room.

Clerks and officers of the House of Lords bow to the throne when crossing the chamber.

The Palace of Westminster also has a second throne under a canopy in the Robing Room, a room of the palace that remains under the authority of the Crown (and not of either House of Parliament), under the direction of the Lord Great Chamberlain, and that is used by the monarch to robe and to unrobe before and after the State Opening of Parliament.

==== Windsor Castle ====
Windsor Castle has a throne room known as the Garter Throne Room, where a chapter meeting of the Order of the Garter, including, if necessary, the investiture of any new Knights and Ladies, takes place once a year. The room accommodates two rows of chairs for all Knights and Ladies of the Garter, with the sovereign's Throne at the head. The current throne housed in the Garter Throne room is another personal throne of Queen Elizabeth II although sometimes the Indian Throne, a gift to Queen Victoria, is used.

==== Colloquial usage ====
In British English, "throne room" is also used as a euphemism for "lavatory".

=== Ireland ===
==== Dublin Castle ====
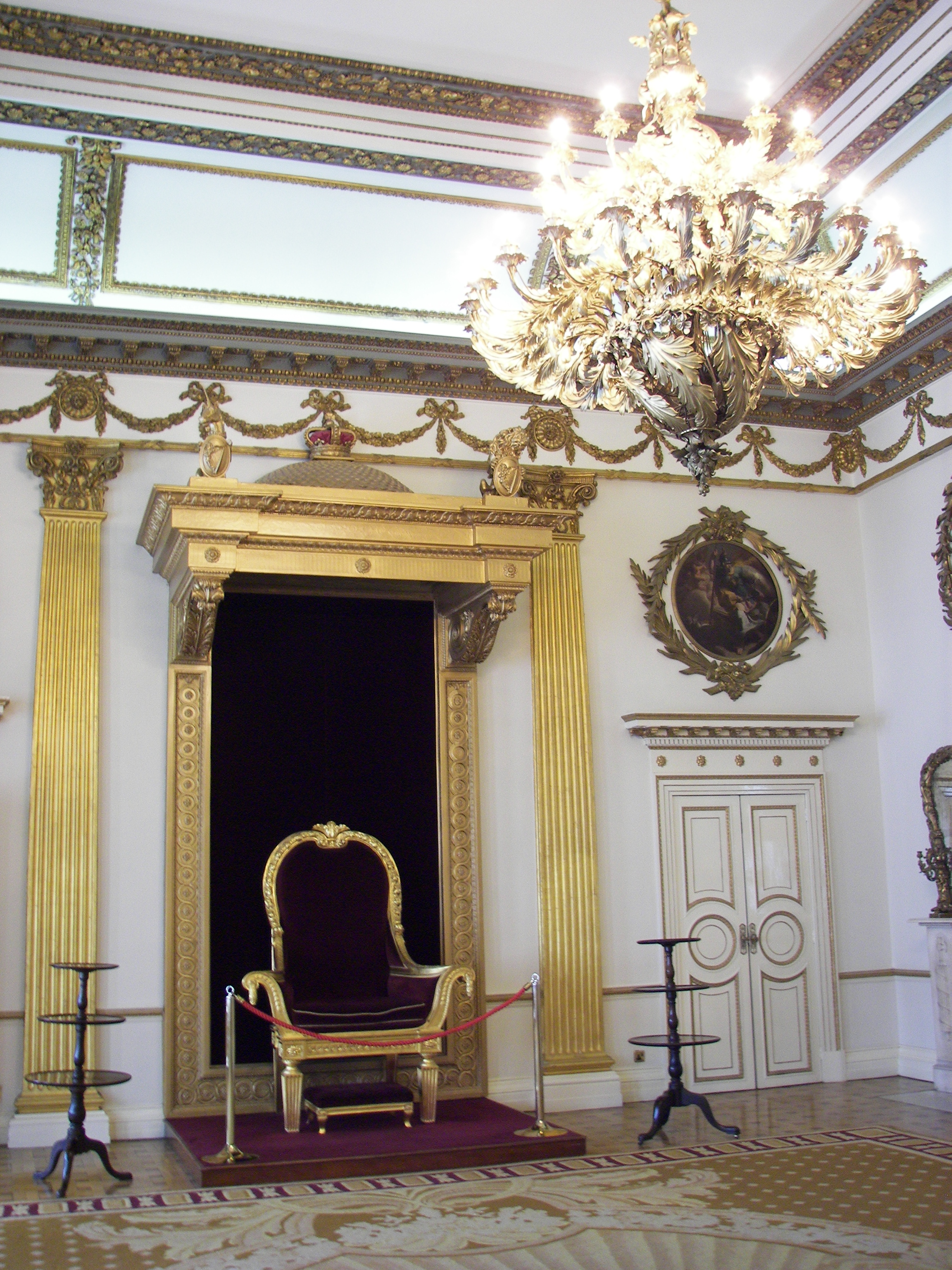
Throne Room in Dublin Castle, Ireland

Located in the State Apartments, the Throne Room in Dublin Castle is preserved intact from the period when Ireland was part of the United Kingdom, when both Lords Lieutenant and visiting monarchs from Britain would use the room during important ceremonies held in the Castle. These included the investing of a new Lord Lieutenant every five years, the presentation of débutantes to the Lord Lieutenant during the Castle Season held leading up to St. Patrick's Day, and the presentation of subjects to visiting monarchs on official State visits to Ireland. The throne canopy dates to the late 18th century, while the throne was made for the visit of George IV to Ireland in 1821, and was last used by George V in 1911. The Throne Room no longer has any role in modern-day State ceremonial. However Dublin Castle still plays an important role in this respect, serving as the location for the inauguration of the President of Ireland every seven years. This takes place in the much larger and grander St. Patrick's Hall, the 18th century ballroom of the Viceregal Court, positioned almost adjacent to the Throne Room.

=== Malaysia ===
Malaysia's head of state, the Yang di-Pertuan Agong (commonly glossed as "King"), is a position rotated every five years among the nine royal houses of its nine hereditary states. Each has separate palaces and throne rooms for each of the individual states, while the King resides in the Istana Negara (National Palace) in Kuala Lumpur. This and the old palace both had throne rooms called the Balai Rong Seri (Royal Audience Hall), where several state ceremonies including the King's Installation occur.
