= Grand Secretariat =

Government institution in Ming and Qing China

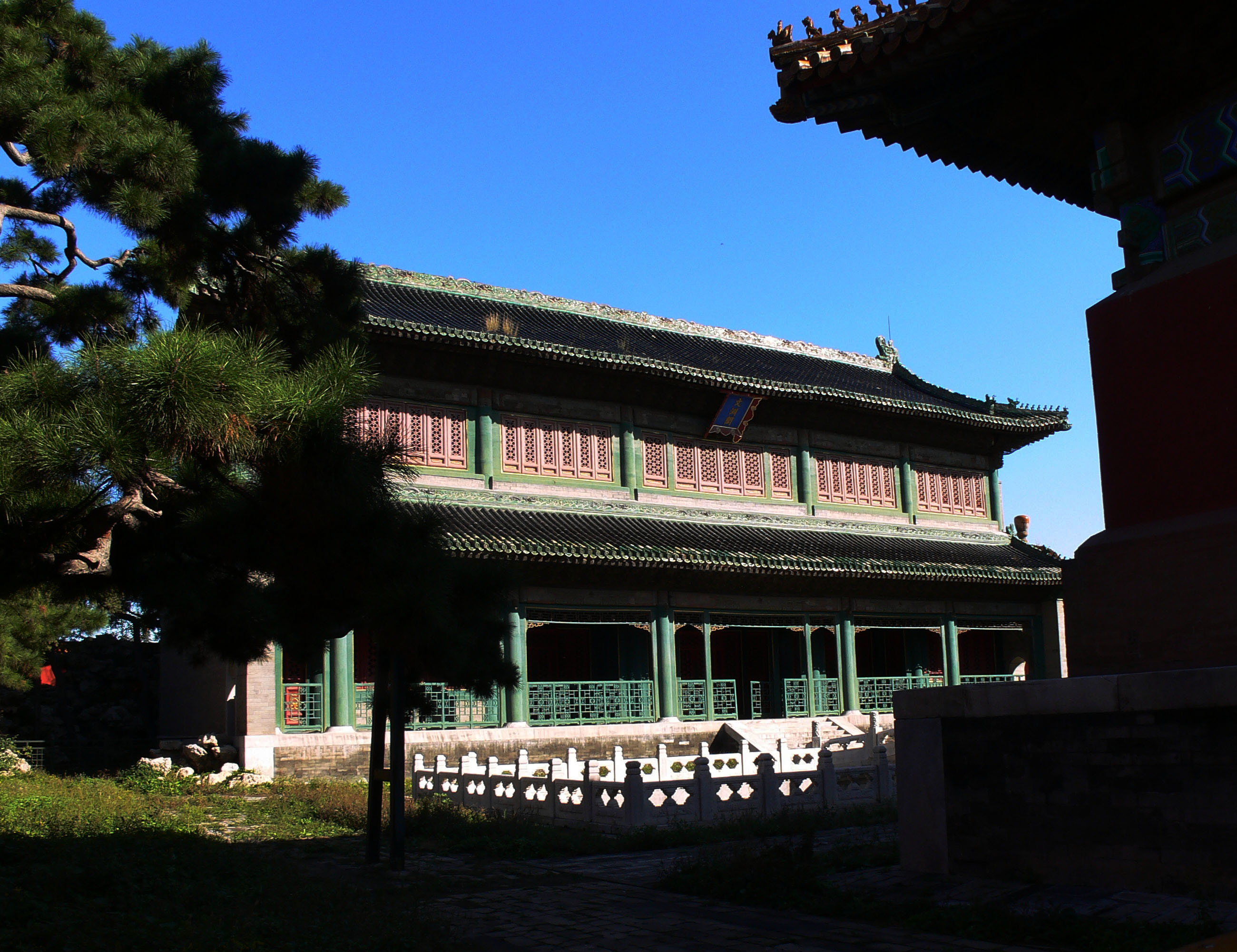
Wenyuan Chamber in Forbidden City, Beijing, the imperial library in Ming and Qing dynasties

The Grand Secretariat, or the Cabinet (Chinese: 內閣; pinyin: Nèigé), was nominally a coordinating agency but de facto the highest institution in the imperial government of the Chinese Ming dynasty. It first took shape after the Hongwu Emperor abolished the office of Chancellor (of the Zhongshu Sheng) in 1380 and gradually evolved into an effective coordinating organ superimposed on the Six Ministries. There were altogether six Grand Secretaries (Chinese: 內閣大學士), though the posts were not always filled. The most senior one was popularly called Senior Grand Secretary (首輔, shǒufǔ). The Grand Secretaries were nominally ranked as mid-level officials, ranked much lower than the Ministers, heads of the Ministries. However, since they screened documents submitted to the emperor from all governmental agencies, and had the power of drafting suggested rescripts for the emperor, generally known as piàonǐ (票擬) or tiáozhǐ (條旨), some senior Grand Secretaries were able to dominate the whole government, acting as de facto grand chancellor. The term nèigé itself is now used to refer to the modern cabinet in Chinese.

The Grand Secretariat system was adopted by the Later Lê dynasty and Nguyễn dynasty of Vietnam. It was also adopted by the Qing dynasty of China, but only served as the de jure highest institution in Qing China.

== Evolution ==
At the beginning of the Ming dynasty, the administration adopted the Yuan dynasty's model of having only one department, the Secretariat, superimposed on the Six Ministries. The Secretariat was led by two Chancellors, differentiated as being "of the left" (senior) and "of the right" (junior), who were the head of the whole officialdom in the empire. The Hongwu Emperor was concerned that such a concentration of power in the office of Chancellors would become a serious threat to the throne. In 1380, Chancellor Hu Weiyong was executed upon accusations of treason. After that, the Hongwu Emperor eradicated the Secretariat and the posts of Chancellor; Ministers of the Six Ministries directly reported to the emperor himself.

The burden of the administrative details made it imperative for the emperor to seek secretarial assistance. In 1382, the Hongwu Emperor drew from the Hanlin Academy, an institution that provided literary and scholarly services to the court, several Grand Secretaries to process his administrative paperwork. These Grand Secretaries were assigned for duty to designated buildings within the imperial palace, and they were collectively known as the Grand Secretariat since the reign of the Yongle Emperor.

The Grand Secretariat gradually had more effective power since the Xuande Emperor's time. During his reign, all memorials from the Ministries to the emperor had to go through the Grand Secretariat. Upon receiving a memorial, the Grand Secretaries first scrutinized it and then decided upon proper response. The rescript was then pasted to the face of the memorial and submitted with it to the emperor. Through this process known as piaoni, the Grand Secretariat became de facto the highest policy-formulation institution above the Six Ministries, and the senior Grand Secretaries had power comparable to the Chancellor of old.

== Rank of Grand Secretaries ==
During the Ming dynasty, civil service officials were classified into nine grades, each grade subdivided into two degrees, extending from grade 1a at the top to grade 9b at the bottom. For example, the top-ranking, non-functional civil service posts of the Three Councillors of State had rank 1a, so did the office of Chancellor. Under this system, the Grand Secretaries, having merely a rank 5a, nominally ranked under various Ministers (whose rank rose from 3a to 2a after the abolishment of the Chancellor). However, the Grand Secretaries were usually given other high-ranking posts of regular administrative agencies, such as Ministers or Vice Ministers in one of the Nine Ministries. Some even obtained the title of Grand Preceptor among the Three Councillors of State. As a result, throughout the Ming dynasty, the Grand Secretaries always took precedence over other civil service officials by virtue of their honorable status among the Three Councillors of State, or their appointments as high-ranking officials in the administrative hierarchy.

== Titles of Grand Secretary ==
=== In China ===
During Ming dynasty, there were 6 different titles of Grand Secretary:

- Grand Secretary of the Zhongji Hall (中極殿大學士): named after the Zhongji Hall (present-day the Zhonghe Hall). Changed name from Grand Secretary of the Huagai Hall (華蓋殿大學士) during Jiajing era.
- Grand Secretary of the Jianji Hall (建極殿大學士): named after the Jianji Hall (present-day the Baohe Hall). Changed name from Grand Secretary of the Jinshen Hall (謹身殿大學士) during Jiajing era.
- Grand Secretary of the Wenhua Hall (文華殿大學士): named after the Wenhua Hall.
- Grand Secretary of the Wuying Hall (武英殿大學士): named after the Wuying Hall.
- Grand Secretary of the Wenyuan Library (文淵閣大學士): named after the Wenyuan Library.
- Grand Secretary of the Eastern Library (東閣大學士): named after the Eastern Library (東閣).

During Qing dynasty, there were 7 different titles of Grand Secretary:

- Grand Secretary of the Zhonghe Hall (中和殿大學士, Manchu: dulimba i hūwaliyambure deyen i aliha bithei da): named after the Zhonghe Hall.
- Grand Secretary of the Baohe Hall (保和殿大學士, Manchu: enteheme hūuwaliyambure diyan i aliha bithei da): named after the Baohe Hall. Abolished by Qianlong Emperor in 1748.
- Grand Secretary of the Wenhua Hall (文華殿大學士, Manchu: šu eldengge diyan i aliha bithei da): named after the Wenhua Hall.
- Grand Secretary of the Wuying Hall (武英殿大學士, Manchu: horonggo yangsangga deyen i aliha bithei da): named after the Wuying Hall.
- Grand Secretary of the Wenyuan Library (文淵閣大學士, Manchu: šu tunggu asari i aliha bithei da): named after the Wenyuan Library.
- Grand Secretary of the Eastern Library (東閣大學士, Manchu: dergi asari i aliha bithei da): named after the Eastern Library (東閣).
- Grand Secretary of the Tiren Library (體仁閣大學士, Manchu: gosin be dursulere asari i aliha bithei da): named after the Tiren Library. Created by Qianlong Emperor in 1748.
- Assistant Grand Secretary (協辦大學士, Manchu: aisilame icihiyara aliha bithei da)

=== In Vietnam ===
In Vietnam, during Nguyễn dynasty, there were 5 different titles of Grand Secretary:

- Grand Secretary of the Cần Chánh Hall (Cần Chánh điện Đại học sĩ, 勤政殿大學士): named after the Cần Chánh Hall.
- Grand Secretary of the Văn Minh Hall (Văn Minh điện Đại học sĩ, 文明殿大學士): named after the Văn Minh Hall.
- Grand Secretary of the Võ Hiển Hall (Võ Hiển điện Đại học sĩ, 武顯殿大學士): named after the Võ Hiển Hall.
- Grand Secretary of the Đông Các Hall (Đông Các điện Đại học sĩ, 東閣殿大學士): named after the Đông Các Hall (lit. "Eastern Library").
- Assistant Grand Secretary (Hiệp tá đại học sĩ, 協佐大學士)

== See also ==
- Nội các (Nguyễn dynasty)
- Censorate
- Grand Council (Qing dynasty)
- Three Excellencies
- Zhongshu Sheng
