= Yin Shidan =

- Born: 1522; Jinan
- Died: 1582 (aged 59–60)
- Occupations: literary scholar, government official

Yin Shidan (Chinese: 殷士儋; pinyin: Yīn Shìdān, 1522–1582) was a literary figure and government official during the Ming dynasty. Yin Shidan was born in Licheng, Jinan into a poor family. He took the Imperial examination in 1547 and eventually became a member of the Grand Secretariat, de facto the highest institution in the Ming imperial government. He was dismissed from government in 1571. Yin Shidan is buried there in the Yinjialin Village (Yin Jia Lin Cun, to the southwest of Jinan), where some of his descendants still live. His tomb was damaged during the Cultural Revolution, but the tomb mound still remains.
