= Hall of Literary Brilliance =

Historic structure in Beijing, China

- 文華殿
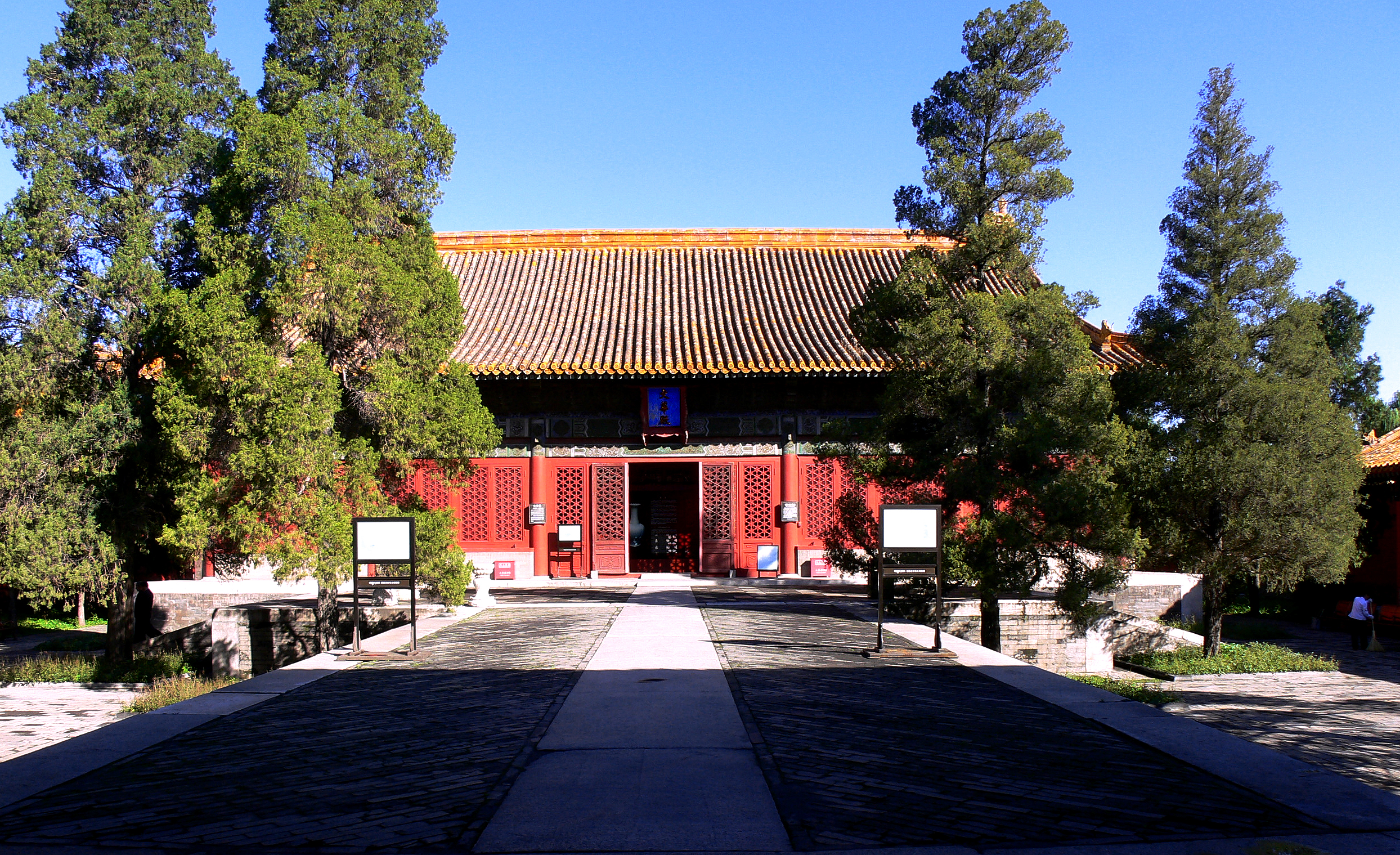
- Hall of Literary Brilliance
- Alternative names: Hall of Literary Glory, Hall of Literary Flourishing, Wenhua Hall

General information
- Type: Hall
- Location: Forbidden City
- Coordinates: 39.915552319038056°N 116.39935458109551°E

The Hall of Literary Brilliance (simplified Chinese: 文华殿; traditional Chinese: 文華殿; pinyin: Wénhuá diàn), or the Hall of Literary Glory or Wenhua Hall, is a hall in the outer court of the Forbidden City, located far east of the Hall of Supreme Harmony. In the early Ming dynasty, the hall was originally used as the residence of the heir apparent. However, starting in 1536, Ming emperors began to use the building as a secondary hall. During both the Ming and Qing dynasty, the hall hosted grand imperial lectures on Confucian classics and served as a place for the emperor to meet his scholars and officials. The hall was also where palace examinations papers would be reviewed and marked by nine readers who would be sequestered in the hall for two days. The hall gave its name to one of the seven different titles of grand secretary in late-imperial China. Becoming Grand Secretary of Wenhua Hall was considered to be an especially prestigious honour for high-ranking mandarins.

From 2008 to 2017, the hall served as the location of the Palace Museum's ceramics gallery before it was moved to the Hall of Martial Valor.
