= Belvedere of Embodying Benevolence =

Building in Forbidden City, China

- 体仁阁
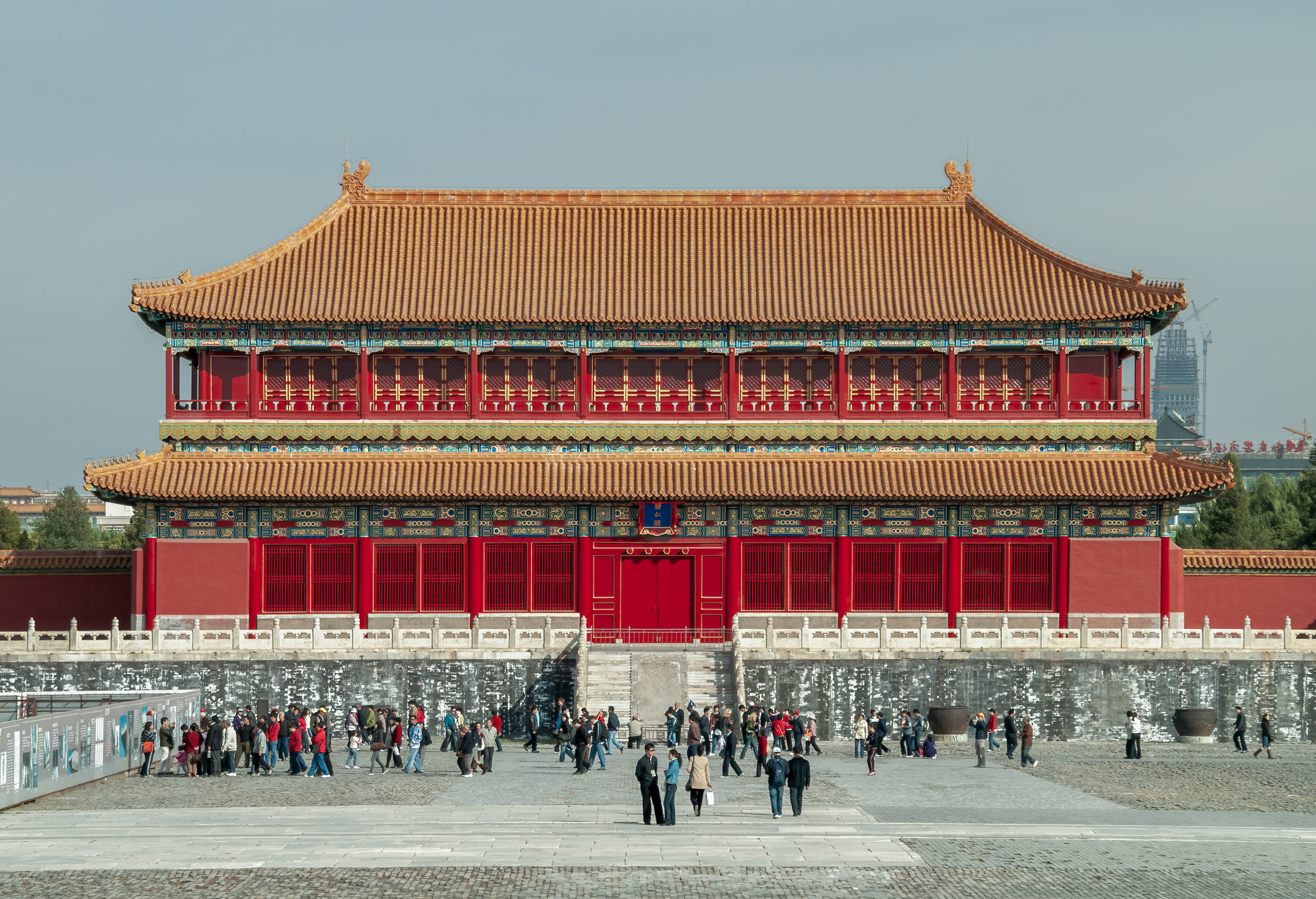
- The building's exterior in 2007
- Interactive map of the Belvedere of Embodying Benevolence area

General information
- Location: Beijing, China
- Coordinates: 39°54′54″N 116°23′32″E

The Belvedere of Embodying Benevolence (simplified Chinese: 体仁阁; traditional Chinese: 體仁閣; pinyin: Tǐrén Gé; Manchu: ᡤᠣᠰᡳᠨ ᠪᡝ
ᡩᡠᡵᠰᡠᠯᡝᡵᡝ
ᠠᠰᠠᡵᡳ gosin be dursulere asari), Tiren Ge or Tiren Library is a building in Forbidden City's Outer Court, in Beijing, China.
