= Hall of Supreme Harmony =

- 太和殿
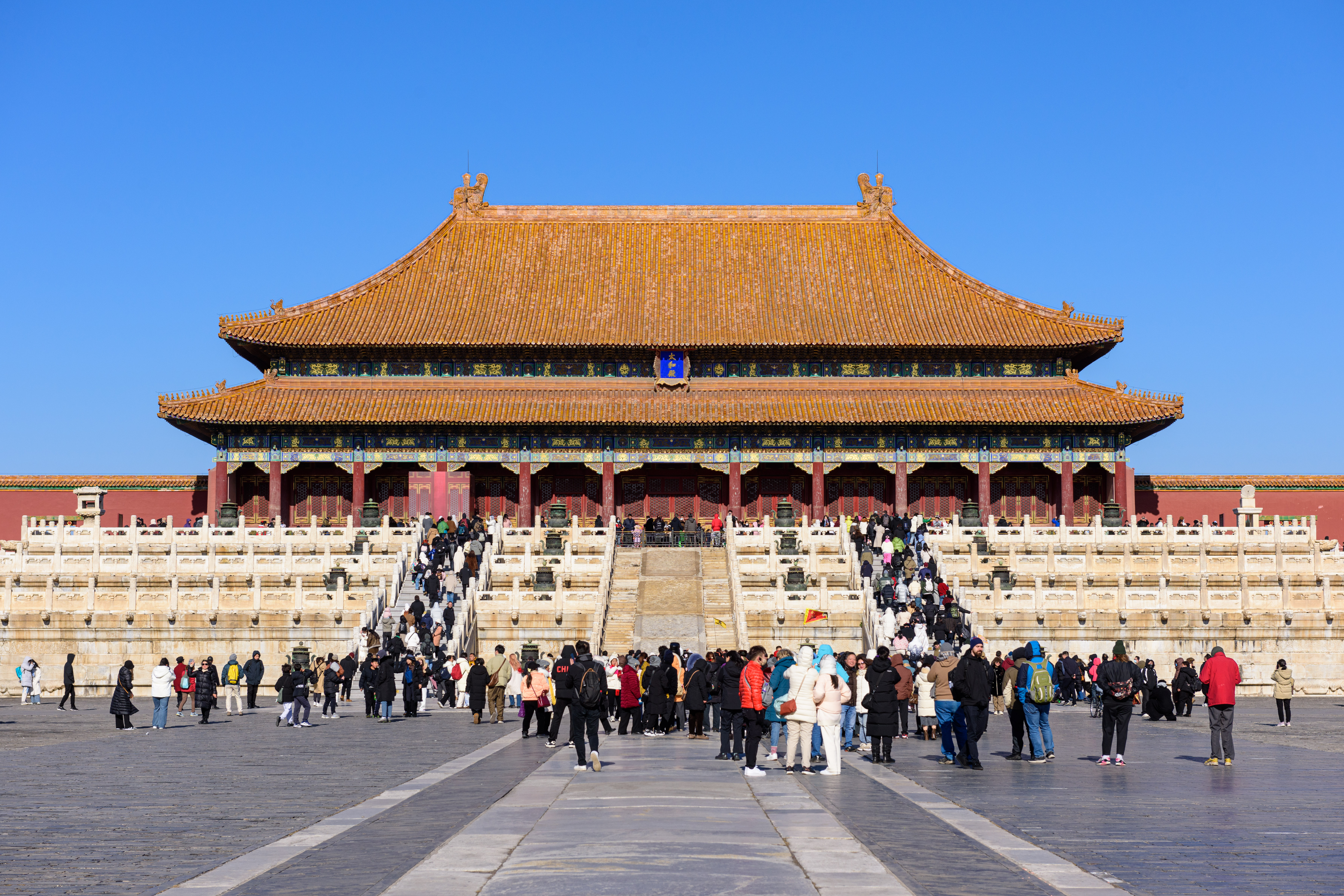
- The Hall of Supreme Harmony (太和殿) at the centre of the Forbidden City

- Location within Beijing
- Former names: Fengtian Dian
- Alternative names: Tài Hé Diàn

General information
- Type: Hall
- Location: Forbidden City, Beijing, China
- Coordinates: 39°54′57.2″N 116°23′26.4″E
- Completed: 1421
- Renovated: 1695–1697

The Hall of Supreme Harmony (Chinese: 太和殿; pinyin: Tài Hé Diàn; Manchu: ᠠᠮᠪᠠ
ᡡᠸᠠᠯᡳᠶᠠᠮᠪᡠᡵᡝ
ᡩᡝᠶᡝᠨ; Möllendorff: amba hūwaliyambure deyen) is the largest hall within the Forbidden City in Beijing, China. It is located at its central axis, behind the Gate of Supreme Harmony. Built above three levels of marble stone base, and surrounded by bronze incense burners, the Hall of Supreme Harmony is one of the largest wooden structures within China. It was the location where the emperors of the Ming and Qing dynasties hosted their enthronement and wedding ceremonies. The name of the Hall was changed several times throughout the past few centuries, from its initial Hall of Venerating Heaven (奉天殿; Fèngtiān Diàn), later to Hall of Imperial Supremacy (皇極殿; Huángjí Diàn) in 1562 and to the current one by the Shunzhi Emperor of the Qing dynasty in 1645.

Together with the Hall of Central Harmony and Hall of Preserving Harmony, the three halls constitute the heart of the Outer Court of the Forbidden City.

The Hall of Supreme Harmony rises some 30 metres (98 ft) above the level of the surrounding square. It is the ceremonial center of imperial power, and the largest surviving wooden structure in China. It is eleven bays wide – with the main room being nine bays wide – and five bays deep, the numbers nine and five being symbolically connected to the majesty of the Emperor. The six pillars nearest the imperial throne are covered with gold, and the entire area is decorated with a dragon motif. The Dragon Throne, in particular, has five dragons coiled around the back and handrests. The screen behind it features sets of nine dragons, again reflecting the "nine-five" symbolism. The Hall of Supreme Harmony features an exquisite throne made of red sandalwood, and formerly used by the emperors of the Qing dynasty.

Set into the ceiling directly above the throne is an intricate caisson decorated with a coiled dragon, from the mouth of which issues a chandelier-like set of metal balls, called the "Xuanyuan Mirror", a reference to the Yellow Emperor, a mythological Chinese ruler. According to legend, the metal balls will fall and strike dead any usurper to the throne.

Visual tour of the central axis buildings of the Forbidden City, beginning from Tiananmen Gate through the Gate of Divine Might (no audio).

In the Ming dynasty, the emperors held court here to discuss affairs of state. During the Qing dynasty, emperors held court far more frequently. As a result, the location was changed to the Inner Court, and the Hall of Supreme Harmony was only used for ceremonial purposes, such as enthronements, investitures, and imperial weddings.

The original hall was built in 1421 during the Ming dynasty, destroyed seven times by fires during the Qing dynasty, and rebuilt for the last time in 1695–1697. After a reconstruction in the 16th century, the dimensions of the hall were reduced from around 95 by 48 metres (312 ft × 157 ft) to its present measurements, 65 by 37 metres (213 ft × 121 ft). Inability to find sufficiently large logs was cited as the cause for this change.

== Gallery ==
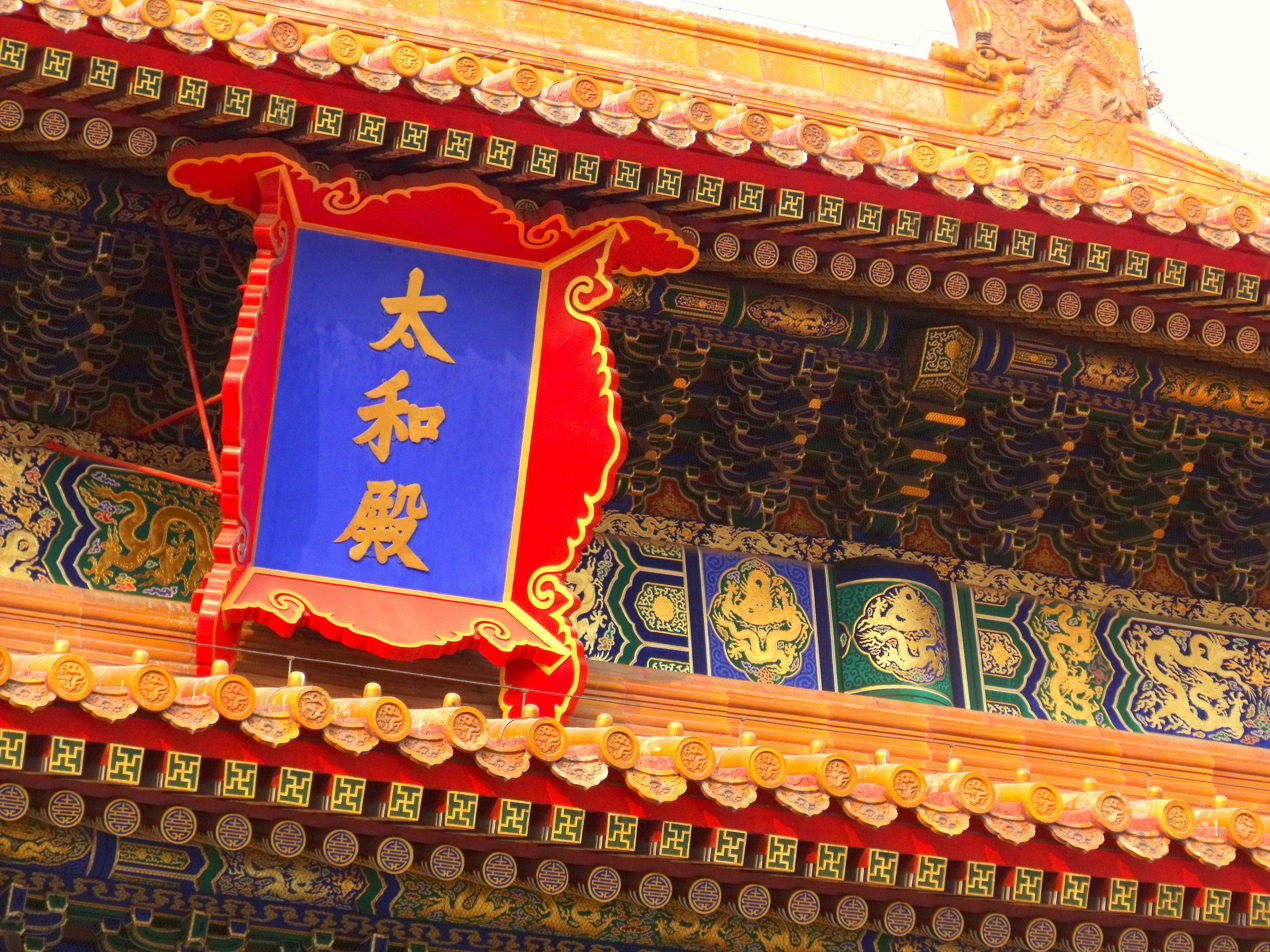
The tablet of the Hall of Supreme Harmony

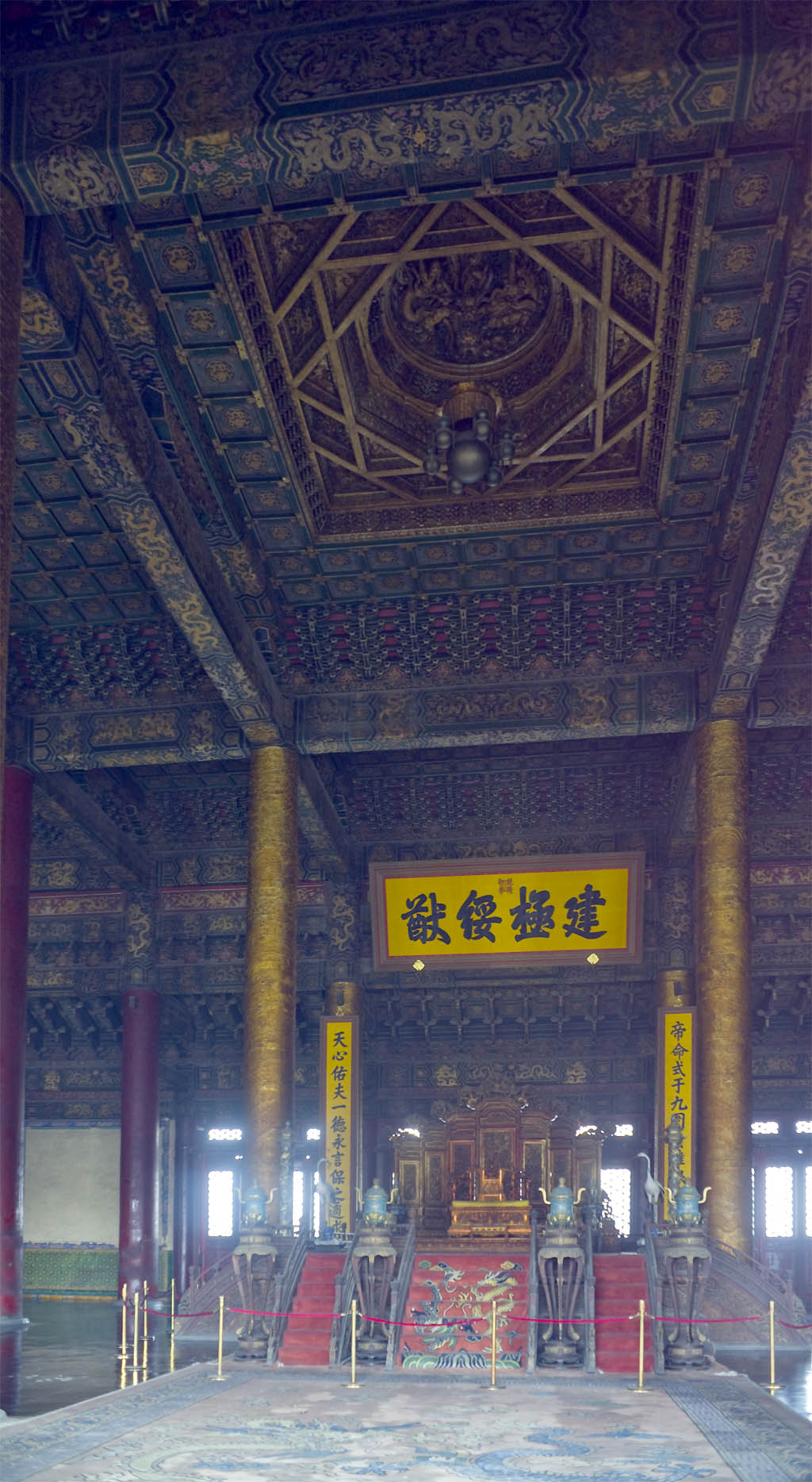
The throne and ceiling

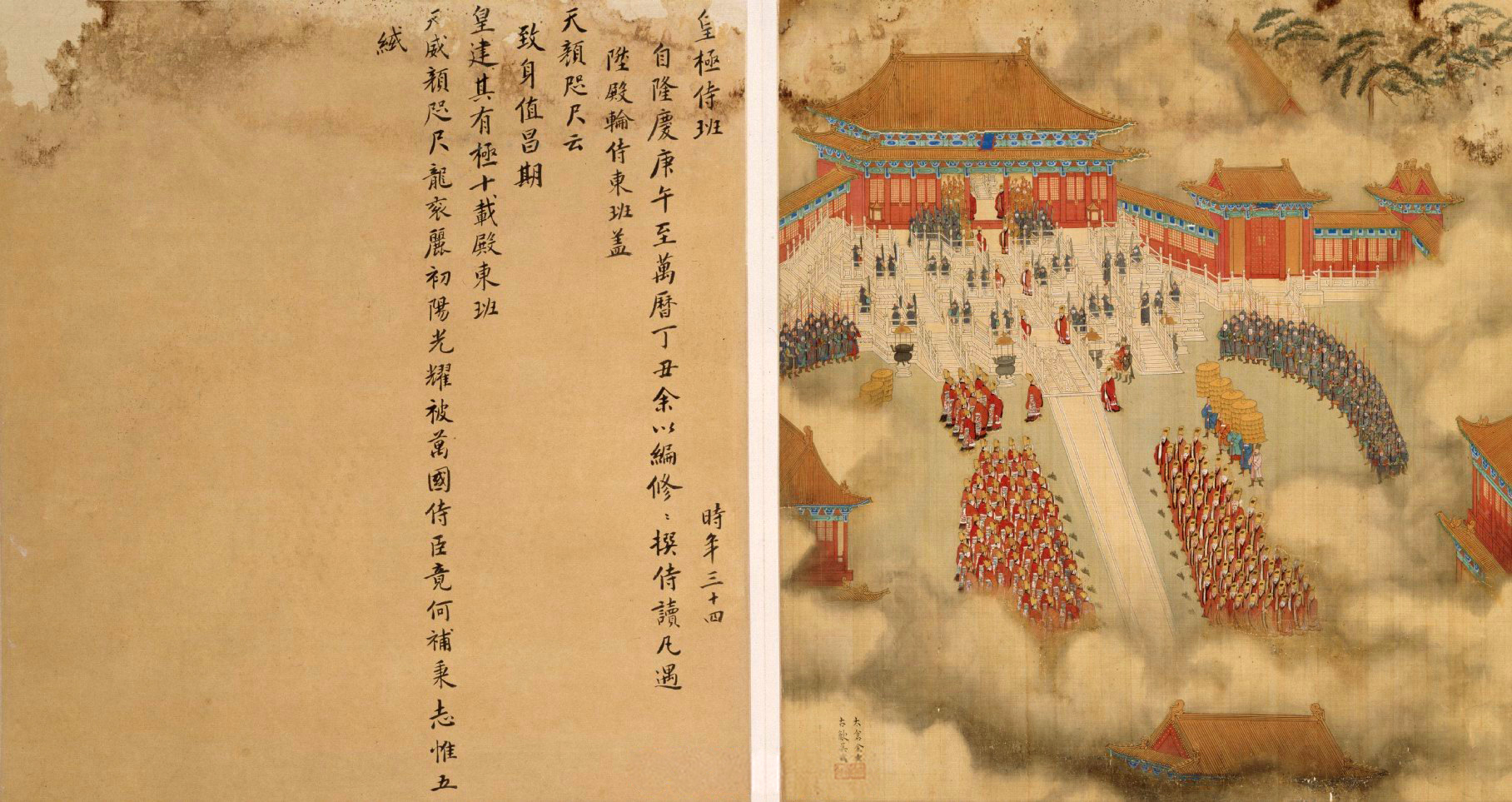
Ceremony in front of the Hall of Supreme Harmony during Wanli's era ,1570

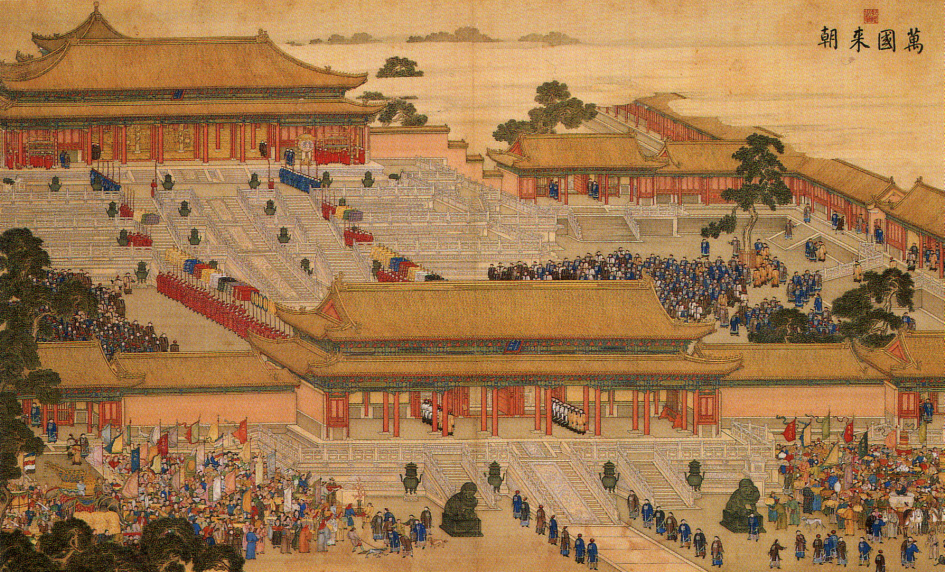
Hall of Supreme Harmony in Qianlong's era

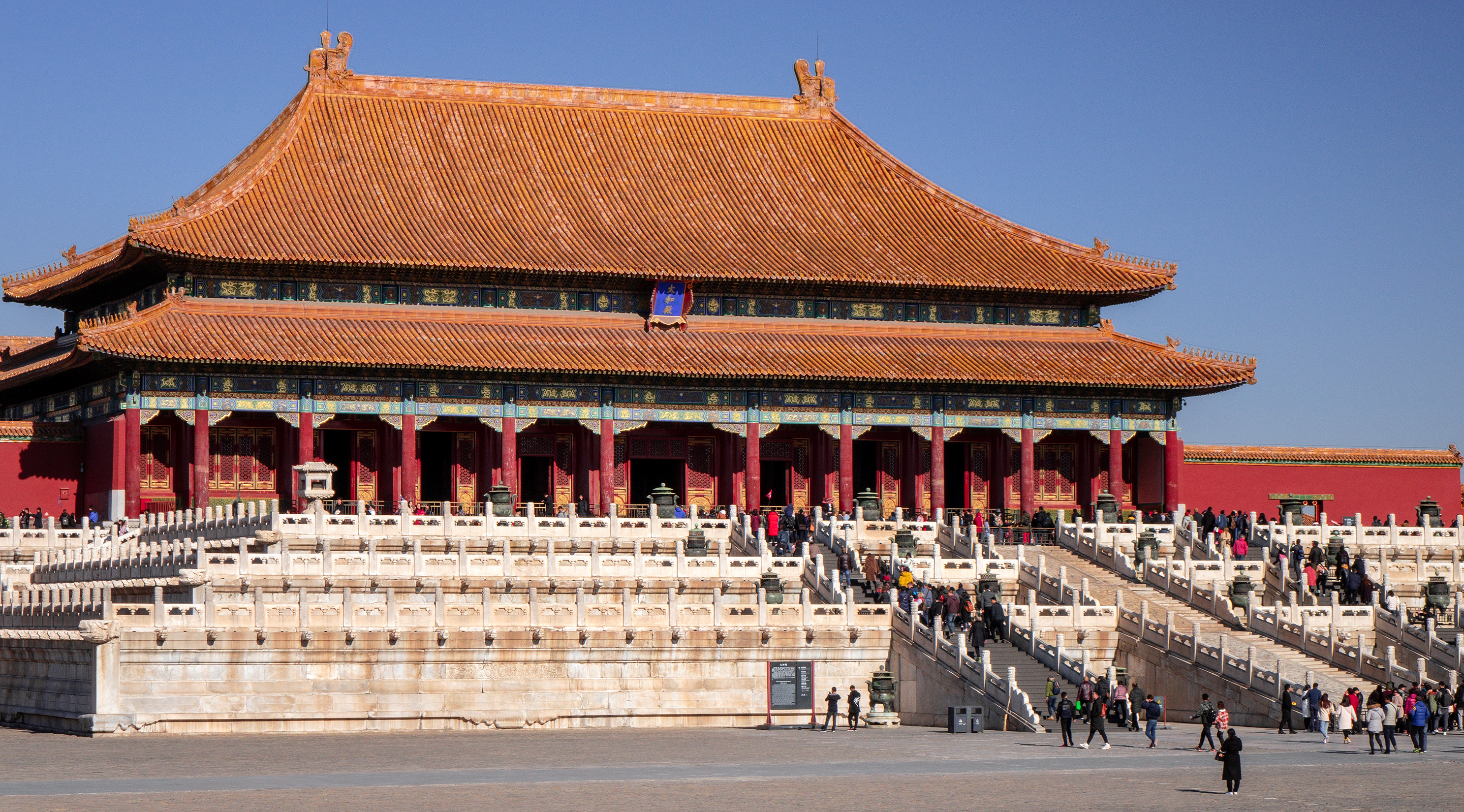
The Hall of Supreme Harmony.

== See also ==
- Hexi Caihua
- Caihua
- Yingzao Fashi
