= Hall of Preserving Harmony =

- 保和殿
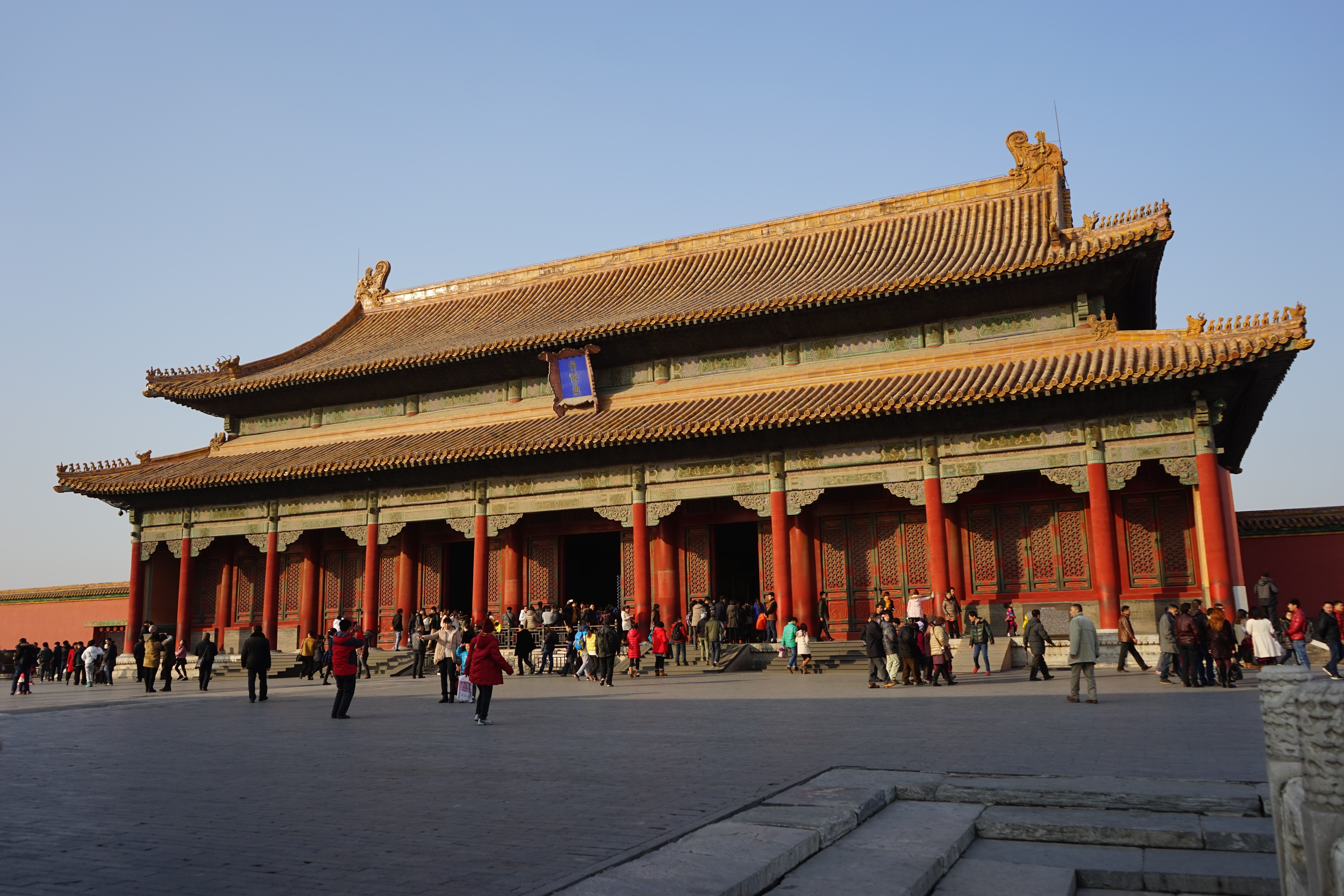
- Hall of Preserving Harmony

- Location within Beijing
- Alternative names: Bǎo Hé Diàn

General information
- Type: Hall
- Location: Forbidden City
- Coordinates: 39°55′1.3″N 116°23′26.2″E

The Hall of Preserving Harmony (Chinese: 保和殿; pinyin: Bǎo Hé Diàn; Manchu: ᡝᠨᡨᡝᡥᡝᠮᡝ
ᡥᡡᠸᠠᠯᡳᠶᠠᠮᠪᡠᡵᡝ
ᡩᡝᠶᡝᠨ enteheme hūwaliyambure deyen) is one of the three halls of the Outer Court of the Forbidden City in Beijing, China, along with the Hall of Supreme Harmony and Hall of Central Harmony. Rectangular in plan, the Hall of Preserving Harmony is similar to, but smaller in scale than, the Hall of Supreme Harmony. It was used for rehearsing ceremonies, and was also the site of the final stage of the Imperial examination. Both of these halls also feature imperial thrones, though to a slightly smaller scale than that in the Hall of Supreme Harmony.

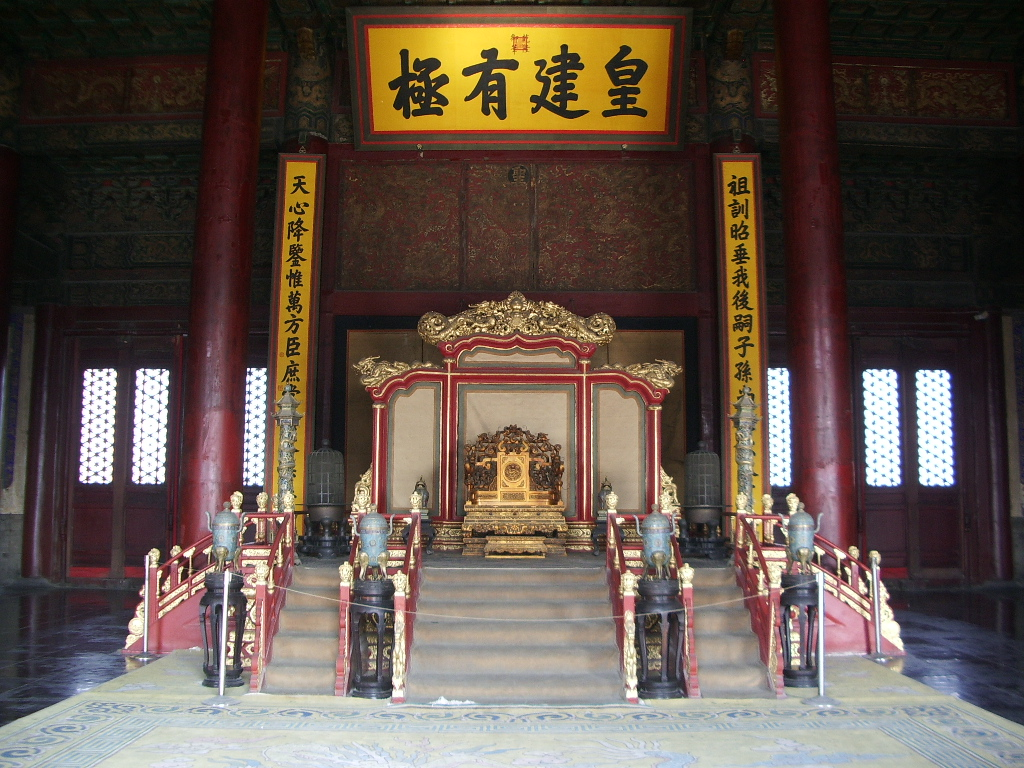
The throne in the Hall of Preserving Harmony
