= Hall of Central Harmony =

- 中和殿
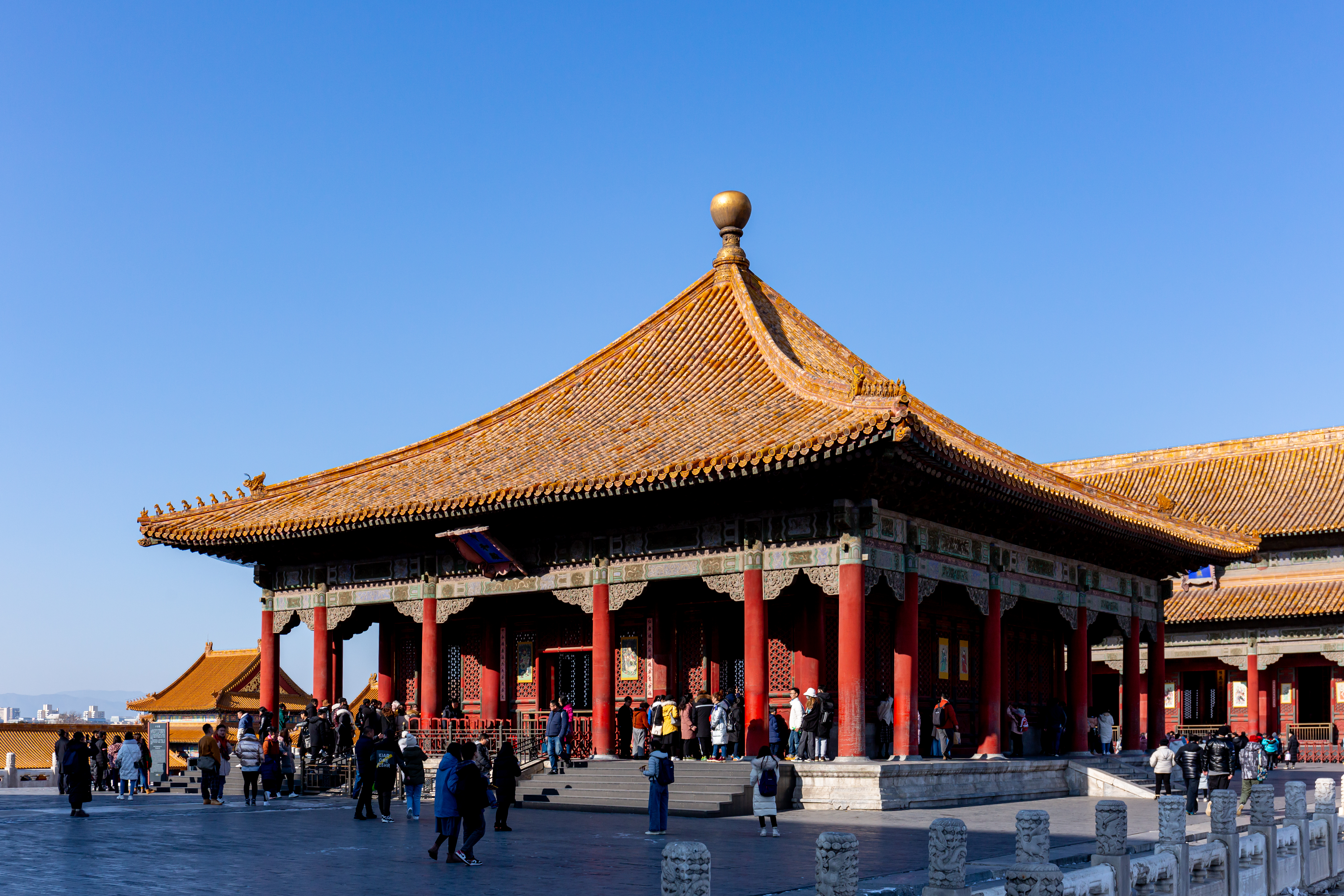
- The Hall of Central Harmony

- Location within Beijing
- Alternative names: Zhōng Hé Diàn

General information
- Type: Hall
- Location: Forbidden City, Beijing, China
- Coordinates: 39°54′59.3″N 116°23′26.2″E

The Hall of Central Harmony (Chinese: 中和殿; pinyin: Zhōng Hé Diàn; Manchu: ᡩᡠᠯᡳᠮᠪᠠ ᡳ
ᡥᡡᠸᠠᠯᡳᠶᠠᠮᠪᡠᡵᡝ
ᡩᡝᠶᡝᠨ dulimba-i hūwaliyambure deyen) is one of the three halls of the Outer Court of the Forbidden City, in Beijing, China, along with the Hall of Supreme Harmony and Hall of Preserving Harmony. It is smaller than the other two halls, and is square in shape. It was used by the Emperor to prepare and rest before and during ceremonies.

== Gallery ==
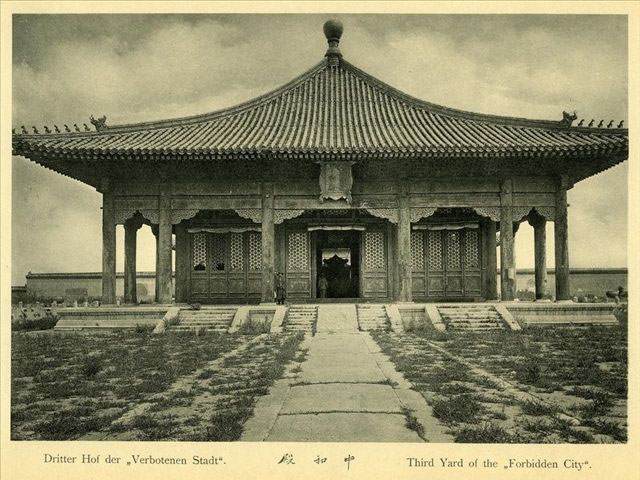
Photo taken in 1900 during Boxer Rebellion.

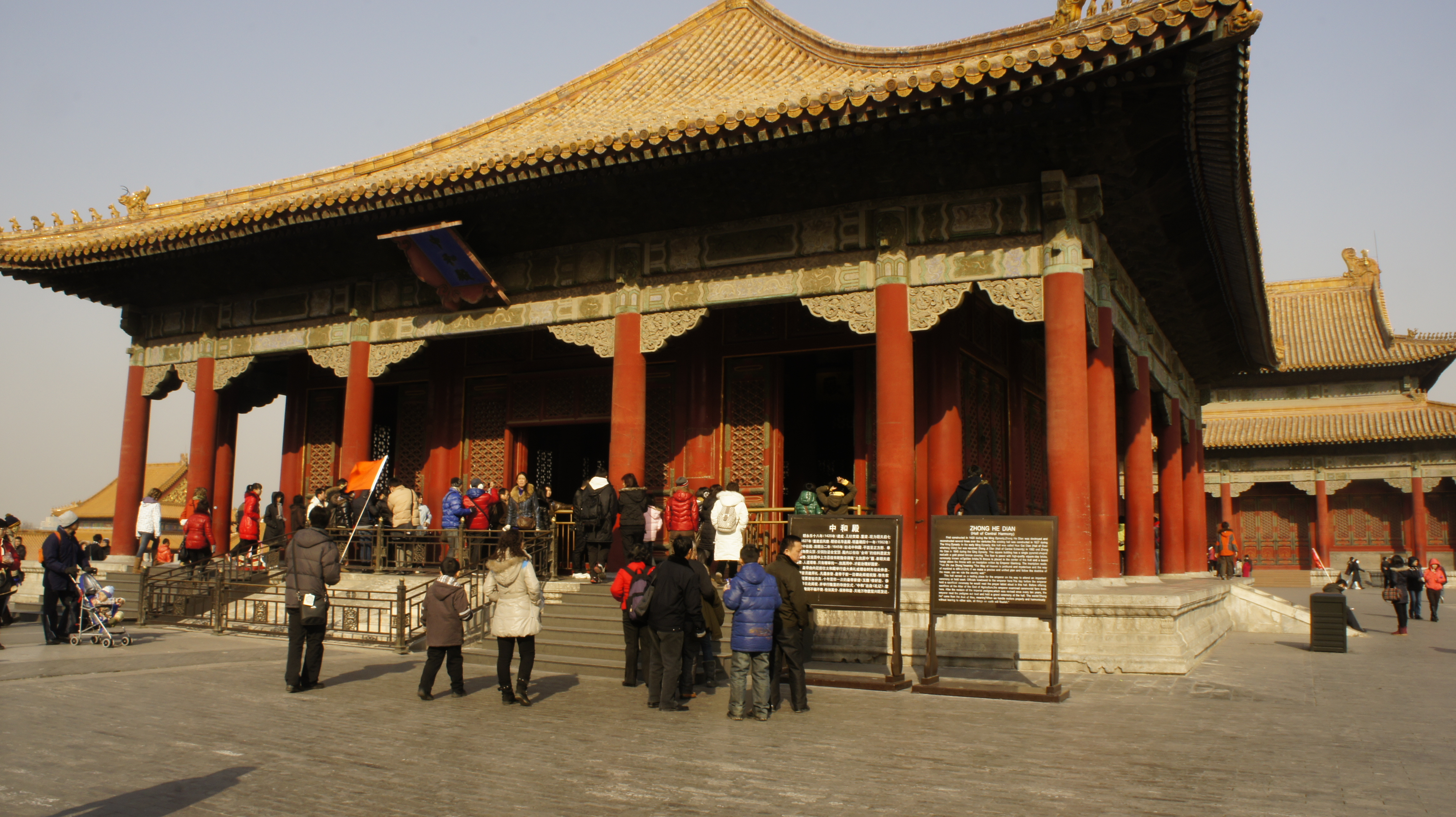
Photo taken in 2011.

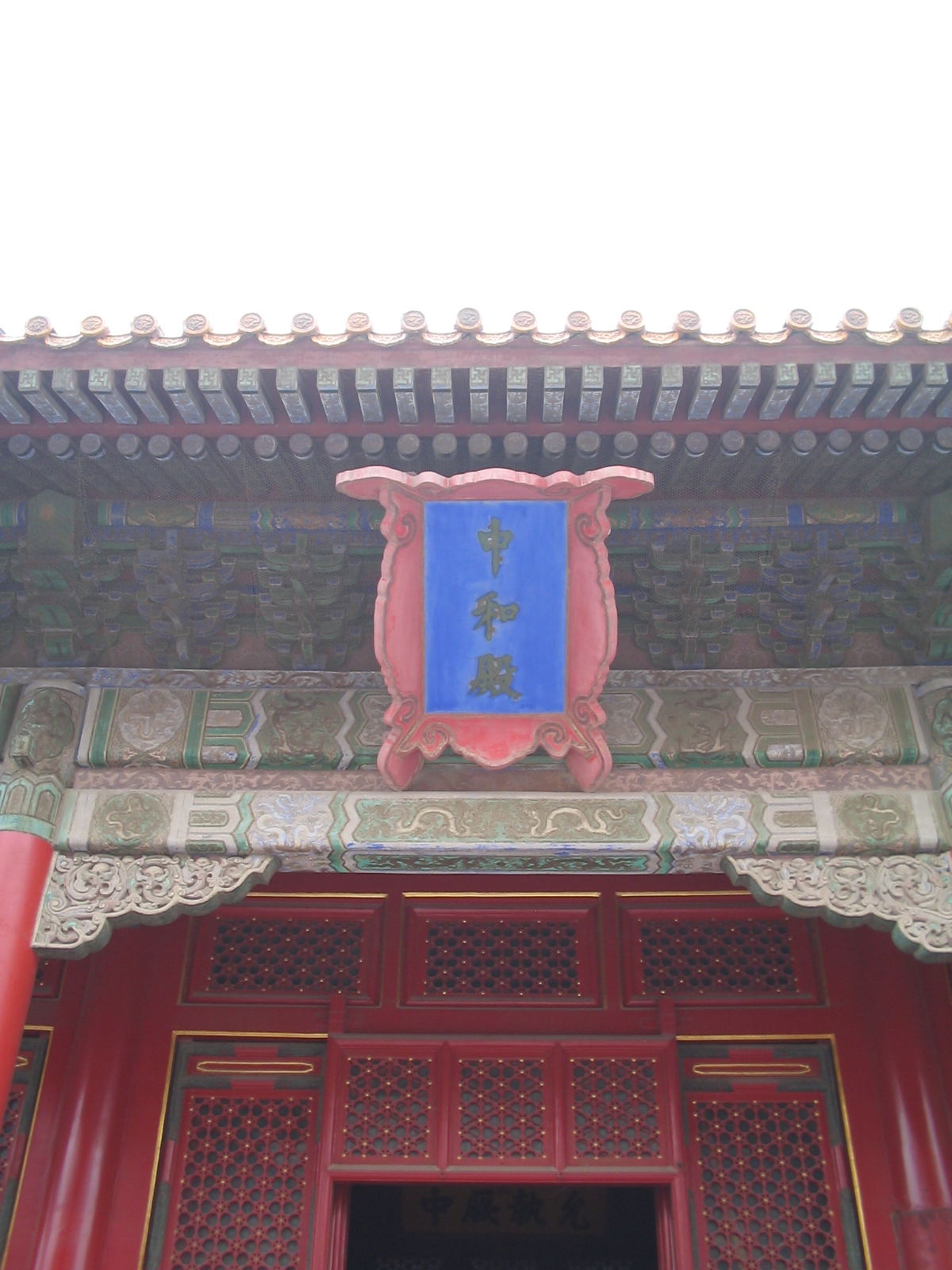
Photo of a nameplate above a gate.

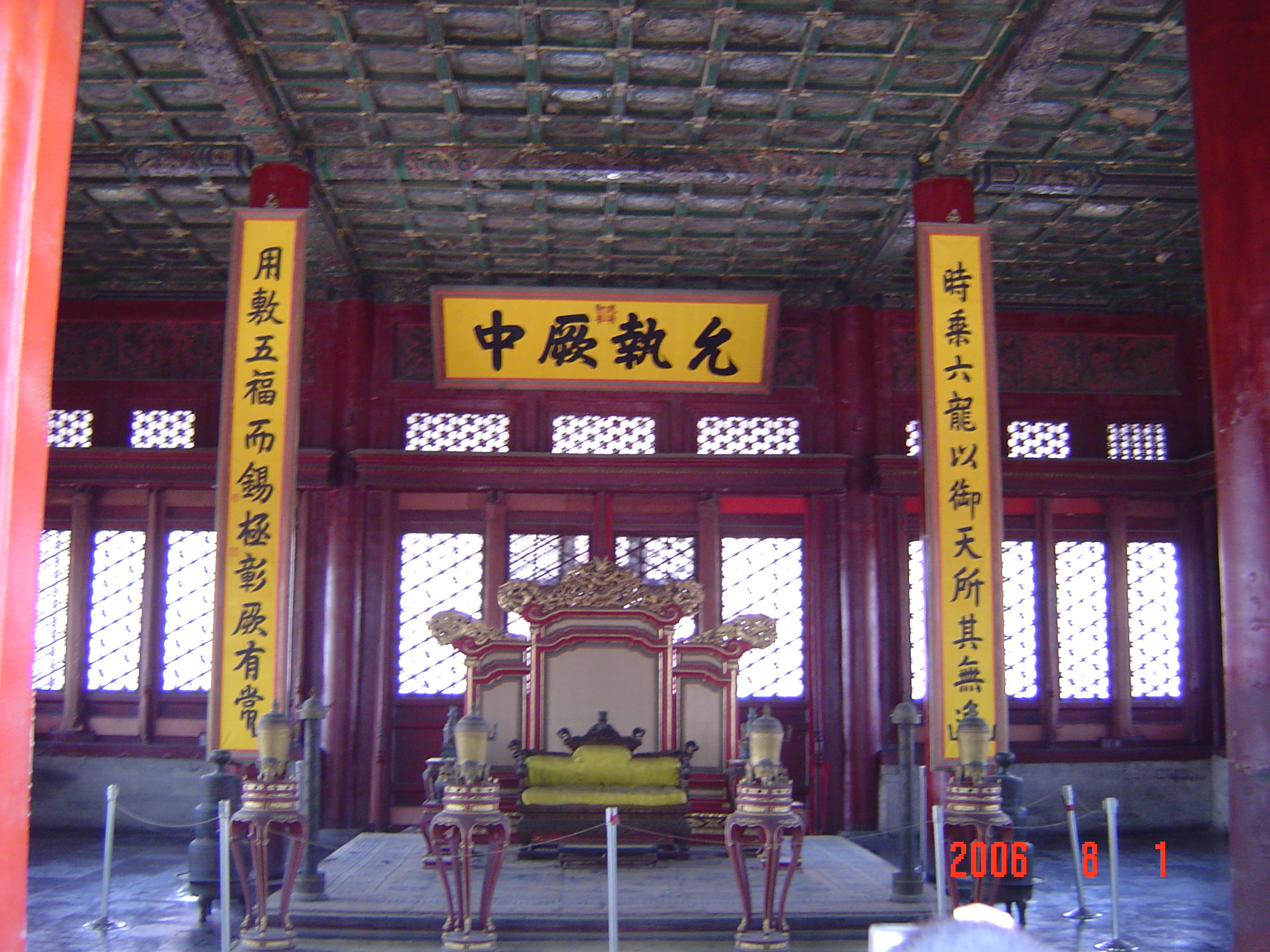
Inside of the hall.
